= 2014 Pinstripe Bowl =

2014 New Era Pinstripe Bowl
- 5th Pinstripe Bowl
| Boston College Eagles | Penn State Nittany Lions |
| (7–5) | (6–6) |
| ACC | Big Ten |
| 30 | 31 |
| Head coach: Steve Addazio | Head coach: James Franklin |
| | 1 | 2 | 3 | 4 | OT | Total |
|---|---|---|---|---|---|---|
| Boston College | 7 | 0 | 14 | 3 | 6 | 30 |
| Penn State | 7 | 0 | 7 | 10 | 7 | 31 |
- Date: December 27, 2014
- Season: 2014
- Stadium: Yankee Stadium
- Location: Bronx, New York
- MVP: Penn State QB Christian Hackenberg
- Favorite: Boston College by 3
- National anthem: Boston College Marching Band
- Referee: Matt Loeffler (SEC)
- Attendance: 49,012

United States TV coverage
- Network: ESPN/ESPN Radio
- Announcers: Bob Wischusen, Matt Millen, & Quint Kessenich (ESPN); Kevin Winter, Jack Ford, & CJ Papa (ESPN Radio)

The 2014 Pinstripe Bowl was an American college football bowl game that was played on December 27, 2014 at Yankee Stadium in the New York City borough of the Bronx. The fifth annual Pinstripe Bowl, it was one of the 2014–15 bowl games that concluded the 2014 FBS football season. The game featured the Boston College Eagles, representing the Atlantic Coast Conference, and the Penn State Nittany Lions, representing the Big Ten Conference and playing their first bowl game since 2011 as a result of sanctions imposed in the wake of the Penn State child sex abuse scandal. The game was sponsored by the New Era Cap Company and was officially known as the New Era Pinstripe Bowl.

Pre-game buildup focused on the teams' respective exceptional defenses, especially the matchup between Boston College's ostensibly strong rushing attack and Penn State's top-ranked rushing defense; the game was expected to be won "in the trenches". Penn State's "anemic" offense sought to finally reach its potential with a strong performance from sophomore quarterback Christian Hackenberg. The other recurring note in pre-game coverage was the juxtaposition between the squads' special teams, specifically kicking. Boston College struggled all year long in that facet of the game, employing a trio of kickers, none of whom was particularly strong or accurate, whereas Penn State's kicking game was anchored by senior Sam Ficken, one of the best kickers in the Big Ten Conference.

Penn State scored first when Hackenberg connected with Chris Godwin for a 70-yard touchdown, but after an ill-fated onside kick attempt, Boston College capitalized on their excellent field position and tied the game back at seven. No scoring occurred in the second quarter, as both defenses entrenched themselves, forcing teams to trade punts. In the third quarter, Boston College scored two touchdowns to take a 14-point lead before Penn State struck back as time expired in that quarter, cutting the Eagles' lead to seven entering the fourth quarter. Penn State tied the game in the middle of the fourth when Hackenberg threw his third touchdown pass of the day, and each team added one more field goal, making the game tied at 24 at the conclusion of regulation. In overtime, Boston College struck first with a quick touchdown pass, but kicker Mike Knoll missed the extra point, so when Penn State responded with a touchdown of their own and Ficken made the extra point, the Lions won by one point, 31–30.

== Teams ==
This was the twenty-fourth overall meeting between these two teams, with Penn State leading the series 19–4; however, Boston College had won the previous three meetings, including the most recent one in 2004. 2014 was the first edition of the game to feature a team from both the Atlantic Coast Conference (ACC), which sent one of its third–sixth bowl eligible teams, and the Big Ten, which sent one of its fifth–seventh bowl eligible teams.

=== Penn State ===
Penn State's season opened in Ireland, winning the Croke Park Classic against Central Florida. Subsequently, they won the remainder of their non-conference schedule in their second, fourth, and tenth games respectively. On September 8, Penn State received news that, heeding a recommendation from George Mitchell, the NCAA decided to "roll back the punishments" levied on the university in wake of the Penn State child sex abuse scandal, thus giving them potential bowl eligibility. On the field, Penn State enjoyed considerably less success in their conference schedule, losing six of eight games, including four consecutive matchups from September 27 until November 1 and their final two regular season games. The Lions sought their first bowl victory since winning the 2010 Capital One Bowl after the 2009 season.

=== Boston College ===
Boston College's season was highlighted with a victory on September 9:

"Few scenes in college football this season could compare to the one in Chestnut Hill, Massachusetts, on Sept. 13, as the Eagles upset then-No. 9 USC 37-31, leading to a prime-time field-storming. More special than the victory itself was whom it was for, as BC donned red bandana-themed uniforms in honor of alum and 9/11 hero Welles Crowther, whose family was given a game ball in the locker room from second-year coach Steve Addazio."

— Excerpt from New Era Pinstripe Bowl: Boston College Eagles vs. Penn State Nittany Lions by Matt Fortuna, ESPN

Otherwise, Boston College posted a 4–4 conference record en route to a 7–5 overall record. It was selected to participate in the bowl after a strong presentation from coach Steve Addazio and athletic director Brad Bates to the bowl committee, in which they highlighted the amount of Boston College alumni near New York.

== Pre-game buildup ==
=== Boston College ===
==== Offense ====
Operating a spread offense that juxtaposed their Heisman Trophy finalist Andre Williams-led power running attack in 2013, Tyler Murphy, a transfer from the University of Florida led the Eagles' 2014 offense, which was otherwise rather inexperienced, and focused on rushing the football, and ranked 15th nationally in rushing yards per game, averaging 251.8. The offense also excelled in ball control, averaging 33 minutes and 2 seconds of possession per game, 11th nationally, but achieved only 132 passing yards per game, sixth-worst in the country. Ryan Day was the offensive coordinator. Murphy compiled 1526 passing yards with 11 touchdowns, and also led the team in rushing yards, posting 1079 along with 10 touchdowns. Other contributors to the rushing attack included freshman roommates Jon Hilliman and Sherman Alston, the former of whom led the team with 12 rushing touchdowns, and was a third-team all-conference honoree. Josh Bordner, a senior wide receiver measuring 6 feet 4 inches (193 cm) and weighing 230 pounds (100 kg), led the team in receiving with 26 catches for 342 yards and three touchdowns. Dan Crimmins – also unusually large for a receiver (6 feet 5 inches (1.96 m), 237 pounds (108 kg)) – was the only other player with more than 20 receptions on the season. Five graduate students comprised Boston College's offensive line, which was anchored at center by Andy Gallik, a second-team all-conference selection. Guard Bobby Vardaro and tackle Ian Silberman received placement on the all-conference third team and as an honorable mention respectively. Overall, the matchup of Boston College offense against the Penn State defense was expected to determine the outcome of the game; Penn State had struggled against some dual-threat quarterbacks (like Murphy) earlier in the season, but remained among the best defenses in the country.

==== Defense ====
Boston College's defense was a statistically strong unit, averaging 313 yards allowed per game, which ranked 12th nationally, and 20.5 points allowed per game, which was tied for 18th nationally. The unit's coordinator was Don Brown, while on the field, the defense's captains were middle linebacker Sean Duggan and strong safety Domonique Williams. Key players on the field included free safety Justin Simmons, whose 70 tackles were best on the team, as well as linebacker Josh Keyes and nose tackle Connor Wujciak, who were third-team all-conference selections. The Eagles' secondary was depleted due to injury and off-field conduct; concurrently, it was ranked 49th nationally in pass defense. Brown summarized the defense by saying, "We’re not perfect, but we’re doing some good things as a team. ... When we tackle well, we’re pretty damn good."

==== Special teams ====
Boston College employed three kickers throughout the season, which confused even Murphy, who served as the holder, as the kickers did not all kick with the same foot. Although Alex Howell began the season as the starter, he ultimately made only five of 11 field goal attempts on the season; Mike Knoll made two of three field goal attempts along with 10 of 11 extra point attempts, and Joey Launceford, a walk-on, made all four of his field goal attempts, but missed four extra point attempts. Howell was the team's punter, and he was better in that role, averaging 42.9 yards on 59 total punts during the season.

=== Penn State ===
==== Offense ====
Entering the game, Penn State had statistically "the worst offense in the conference", having struggled to establish a running game and to protect quarterback Christian Hackenberg; the offense, for much of the season, proved "powerless". Overall, the offense ranked 12th-worst in the country in yards per game (326), 9th-worst in rushing yards per game (103.6), and 14th-worst in points per game (19.9); they were in the middle of the national rankings in terms of passing yards, averaging 221.9 per game. The Nittany Lions placed no offensive players on the coaches' all-conference team, and only two players received even honorable mentions, tight end Jesse James and wide receiver DaeSean Hamilton. The Lions ran a pro-style offense, coordinated by John Donovan, and led on the field by sophomore quarterback Christian Hackenberg, who despite an outstanding freshman season, ostensibly regressed during his sophomore year, compiling eight touchdown passes and 15 interceptions, and hamstrung by poor performance of players around him, a change in offensive system, and problems with his throwing mechanics. Hackenberg threw to a core of receivers led by Geno Lewis and Hamilton; the pair combined for 123 catches totaling 1517 yards (12.3 average yards per catch) and just two touchdowns. Unlike during the previous years when the tight end position was a focal point on the offense, the tight ends played a decreased role in 2014 for Penn State – in total, four tight ends caught passes for Penn State, of which Jesse James was the leader, finishing third on the team in receiving. Initially, Penn State featured a trio of running backs to comprise their rushing attack, but Zach Zwinak sustained an injury in the middle of the season, leaving Akeel Lynch and Bill Belton, who totaled 603 and 518 rushing yards respectively on the season. Franklin asserted that many of the team's offensive problems were magnified and perpetuated by an inconsistent offensive line: "And let's be honest, all those things are magnified because of what we talked about earlier, up front (on the offensive line)," he said. That offensive line featured a freshman, two converted defensive linemen, and a plethora of injuries, headlined by left guard Miles Dieffenbach, who missed a majority of the season, but returned in time for the bowl game; he was the line's only senior.

==== Defense ====
A stark juxtaposition to the "anemic" offense, Penn State's defense was among the best in the country, and was coordinated by Bob Shoop. The defense ranked first in the country in rushing defense, relinquishing only 84.8 yards per game, second in total defense, relinquishing only 269.8 yards per game, tenth in passing defense, relinquishing only 185 yards per game, and eighth in scoring defense, relinquishing only 17.7 points per game. The defense was anchored by linebacker Mike Hull, whose 132 tackles on the season ranked seventh in the FBS, and defensive tackle Anthony Zettel, who led the team in "a strange hat trick" of defensive statistics – tackles for a loss, sacks, and interceptions. Both Hull and Zettel were first-team all-conference selections, while Hull earned additional recognition as the Butkus-Fitzgerald Linebacker of the Year, given to the Big Ten's best linebacker. Honorable mention all-conference selections for the Nittany Lions included defensive end Deion Barnes, safety Adrian Amos, and cornerback Jordan Lucas, a "shutdown corner" unrespected outside of Penn State fans. Zettel and Austin Johnson comprised "arguably the top defensive tackle tandem in the conference, if not the nation;" the remainder of Penn State's defensive line, including the second-string, were also crucial to the success of the unit. Other key players on Penn State's defense included defensive end C.J. Olaniyan, a "model of consistency", and linebacker Nyeem Wartman, a "thumper" at weak-side linebacker.

==== Special teams ====
Vastly improved place kicker Sam Ficken, a second-team all-conference honoree, anchored the Nittany Lions special teams; he made 23 of 28 field goal attempts (long of 50 yards), and all 24 extra point attempts. Penn State's punting game had been "problematic" throughout the season, but modestly improved at the end of the season when the team switched from Chris Gulla to Daniel Pasquariello as the predominant punter.

== Game summary ==
=== First quarter ===
Penn State won the coin toss, and elected to receive. Their opening drive reached the Boston College 40-yard line, but after a false start and an incomplete pass, they had to punt. After that, Boston College went three-and-out, and punted back to Penn State. Once again, Penn State approached field goal range on their next drive, but could not score, instead being forced to punt. Jon Hilliman rushed for 44 yards on the first play of Boston College's next possession. On fourth and five from the 30-yard line, Boston College failed to convert, turning the ball over on downs. Faced with a third down and 12 situation on their ensuing drive, Christian Hackenberg threw a long pass down the right sideline for a 72-yard touchdown to Chris Godwin. Penn State attempted an onside kick on the subsequent kickoff, and nearly recovered it, but their receiver was just out of bounds. Consequently, Boston College got excellent field position near midfield. On the second play of the drive, Hilliman rushed for a 49-yard touchdown to tie the game at seven. Penn State got the ball at their own 35-yard line after Boston College kicked off the ball out of bounds. In the waning moments of the first quarter, Penn State drove to just outside the red zone; at the conclusion of the quarter, they were at the Boston College 21-yard line.

=== Second quarter ===
On the first play of the quarter, Hackenberg fumbled the snap, and Boston College recovered, preventing Penn State from scoring on the edge of the red zone. Boston College had success with the rushing game early on their subsequent drive, but eventually it stalled, and they punted. Penn State punted on their next drive as well. When an ineligible player down field penalty negated a pass play of over 30 yards for Boston College on their next drive, they were forced to punt. Defensive superiority continued on the next Penn State drive, when the Lions punted on fourth down and 18. An early personal foul penalty decimated Boston College's next drive, which went three-and-out. Penn State also went three-and-out, and punted back to the Eagles, who got good field position after a 24-yard return during which a potential illegal block in the back penalty against Boston College was not called much to the dismay of Penn State fans and coach James Franklin. That drive never reached fruition, and at the half, the score was tied at seven.

=== Third quarter ===
Boston College received the opening second half kickoff, and proceeded to move the ball down field right to the edge of the range of their kicker around the Penn State 25-yard line; on fourth down, they went for it and converted to move into the red zone. On third down and 12, Tyler Murphy found Shakim Phillips for a 20-yard touchdown pass to take a 14–7 lead. Penn State took the field and moved the ball inside the 30-yard line, but once again turned the ball over on a fumbled snap. The rushing attack took control for Boston College on their ensuing drive, and Murphy rushed for a 40-yard touchdown. Penn State's offense moved down the field with a 32-yard pass from Hackenberg to Lewis plus a facemask penalty that moved them inside Boston College's 15-yard line. On the final play of the third quarter, Hackenberg threw a 7-yard slant pass that Lewis initially bobbled, but eventually corralled for a touchdown, pulling the Lions within seven points.

=== Fourth quarter ===
Boston College lost yardage on their first drive of the quarter, going three-and-out after a holding penalty put them in a long yardage situation. After the teams exchanged punts, Penn State took possession with solid field position at their own 45-yard line. Akeel Lynch rushed 35 yards inside the one yard line; an instant replay held that he did not reach the end zone, and on the next play, a 15-yard penalty moved Penn State back to face a second and goal at the 16-yard line. However, on the next play, Hackenberg threw a 16-yard touchdown pass down the seam to DaeSean Hamilton, tying the game. Another replay review occurred on Boston College's next drive; replay held that Shakim Phillips did not complete the process of the catch on a long pass down the right sideline, and thus the play was ruled incomplete. Nevertheless, Boston College converted the subsequent third down, and their drive continued. They moved to the Penn State 30-yard line with under five minutes remaining. Hilliman rushed the ball outside for Boston College, and Adrian Amos was flagged for a personal foul late hit, moving the Eagles to the 10-yard line. Penn State spent two timeouts to conserve clock as Boston College ran the ball to try to score with about three minutes remaining. On third down and eight, Murphy rushed to the three-yard line, where Mike Knoll lined up to kick a short field goal from the right hash mark. With 2:10 remaining, Knoll made a 20-yard field goal to take a 24–21 lead. With 2:05 remaining, Penn State took the field with one timeout at their own 24-yard line. Penn State methodically moved down field thanks to a 25-yard pass to Godwin. Faced with fourth down and two, Ficken attempted a 45-yard field goal, which he made to tie the game with 20 seconds remaining. With 12 seconds left, Boston College took a knee to send the game into overtime.

=== Overtime ===
Penn State won the overtime coin toss and elected to play defense, an advantage in college football overtime rules. Starting at Penn State's 25-yard line, Boston College took the field hoping to avoid having to kick a field goal, which was an "adventure" all season. They scored a touchdown on a 20-yard pass from Murphy to David Dudeck, but the extra point was no good. Penn State's drive opened with a false start, and two plays later, they faced third down and 15, which they converted via a pass to tight end Jesse James. Shortly thereafter, Hackenberg found Kyle Carter in the corner of the end zone for a touchdown. Ficken made the extra point, and Penn State won 31–30.

=== Scoring summary ===
Scoring summary

| Quarter | Time | Drive | | | Team | Scoring information | Score | |
| Quarter | Time | Plays | Yards | TOP | Team | Scoring information | BC | PSU |
|---|---|---|---|---|---|---|---|---|
| 1 | 5:22 | 3 | 70 | 1:01 | PSU | Chris Godwin 72-yard touchdown reception from Christian Hackenberg, Sam Ficken kick good | 0 | 7 |
| 1 | 4:39 | 2 | 52 | 0:43 | BC | Jon Hilliman 49-yard touchdown run, Mike Knoll kick good | 7 | 7 |
| 3 | 8:07 | 11 | 60 | 6:53 | BC | Shakim Phillips 19-yard touchdown reception from Tyler Murphy, Knoll kick good | 14 | 7 |
| 3 | 2:12 | 4 | 63 | 1:58 | BC | Murphy 40-yard touchdown run, Knoll kick good | 21 | 7 |
| 3 | 0:00 | 6 | 63 | 2:12 | PSU | Geno Lewis 7-yard touchdown reception from Hackenberg, Ficken kick good | 21 | 14 |
| 4 | 6:48 | 6 | 55 | 1:44 | PSU | DaeSean Hamilton 16-yard touchdown reception from Hackenberg, Ficken kick good | 21 | 21 |
| 4 | 2:10 | 11 | 69 | 4:38 | BC | 20-yard field goal by Knoll | 24 | 21 |
| 4 | 0:20 | 8 | 49 | 1:50 | PSU | 45-yard field goal by Ficken | 24 | 24 |
| OT | | 3 | 25 | – | BC | David Dudeck 21-yard touchdown reception from Murphy, Knoll kick no good (wide right) | 30 | 24 |
| OT | | 6 | 25 | – | PSU | Kyle Carter 10-yard touchdown reception from Hackenberg, Ficken kick good | 30 | 31 |
| "TOP" = time of possession. For other American football terms, see Glossary of American football. | | | | | | | 30 | 31 |

=== Team statistics ===
| Statistics | BC | PSU |
|---|---|---|
| First downs | 16 | 25 |
| Plays–yards | 66–386 | 79–453 |
| Rushes–yards | 46–289 | 29–82 |
| Passing yards | 97 | 371 |
| Passing: Comp–Att–Int | 11–20–0 | 34–50–0 |
| Time of possession | 32:19 | 27:41 |

=== Broadcast ===
The game was broadcast on ESPN, with Bob Wischusen, a Boston College alumnus, serving as the play-by-play commentator, Matt Millen, a Penn State alumnus, serving as the game analyst, and Quint Kessenich serving as the sideline reporter. On ESPN Radio, Kevin Winter served as the play-by-play commentator, and Jack Ford provided analysis.
