= 2014 Penn State Nittany Lions football team =

American college football season

2014 Penn State Nittany Lions football

Pinstripe Bowl champion

Pinstripe Bowl, W 31–30 ^{OT} vs. Boston College
- Conference: Big Ten Conference
- East Division
- Record: 7–6 (2–6 Big Ten)
- Head coach: James Franklin (1st season)
- Offensive coordinator: John Donovan (1st season)
- Offensive scheme: Multiple
- Defensive coordinator: Bob Shoop (1st season)
- Base defense: 4–3
- Captains: Miles Dieffenbach; Christian Hackenberg; Mike Hull; C.J. Olaniyan; Ryan Keiser; Jesse Della Valle; Sam Ficken
- Home stadium: Beaver Stadium

2014 Big Ten Conference football standings
	Conf.			Overall
Team	W		L	W		L
East Division
No. 1 Ohio State x$#^	8	–	0	14	–	1
No. T–5 Michigan State	7	–	1	11	–	2
Maryland	4	–	4	7	–	6
Rutgers	3	–	5	8	–	5
Michigan	3	–	5	5	–	7
Penn State	2	–	6	7	–	6
Indiana	1	–	7	4	–	8
West Division
No. 13 Wisconsin x	7	–	1	11	–	3
Minnesota	5	–	3	8	–	5
Nebraska	5	–	3	9	–	4
Iowa	4	–	4	7	–	6
Illinois	3	–	5	6	–	7
Northwestern	3	–	5	5	–	7
Purdue	1	–	7	3	–	9
Championship: Ohio State 59, Wisconsin 0
# – College Football Playoff champion; ^ – College Football Playoff participant; $ – Conference champion; x – Division champion/co-champions; Rankings from AP Poll

The 2014 Penn State Nittany Lions football team represented Pennsylvania State University in the 2014 NCAA Division I FBS football season. The team was led by first year head-coach James Franklin and played its home games in Beaver Stadium in University Park, Pennsylvania. It was a member of the Big Ten Conference and played in the newly organized East Division. Penn State was ineligible to play in a bowl game due to NCAA sanctions imposed in wake of the Penn State child sex abuse scandal. However, on September 8, 2014, the NCAA announced that Penn State would again be eligible for post-season games, effective immediately. Penn State had a 7–6 overall record for the season with a 2–6 conference mark, placing sixth in the Big Ten East Division. The Nittany Lions concluded the season with a victory in the Pinstripe Bowl over Boston College.

== Schedule ==
Date	Time	Opponent	Site	TV	Result	Attendance
August 30	8:30 a.m.	vs. UCF*	Croke Park; Dublin, Ireland (Croke Park Classic)	ESPN2	W 26–24	53,304
September 6	12:00 p.m.	Akron*	Beaver Stadium; University Park, PA	ABC/ESPN2	W 21–3	97,354
September 13	8:00 p.m.	at Rutgers	High Point Solutions Stadium; Piscataway, NJ	BTN	W 13–10	53,774
September 20	4:00 p.m.	UMass*	Beaver Stadium; University Park, PA	BTN	W 48–7	99,155
September 27	12:00 p.m.	Northwestern^{†}	Beaver Stadium; University Park, PA	BTN	L 6–29	102,910
October 11	7:00 p.m.	at Michigan	Michigan Stadium; Ann Arbor, MI (rivalry)	ESPN2	L 13–18	113,085
October 25	8:00 p.m.	No. 13 Ohio State	Beaver Stadium; University Park, PA (rivalry)	ABC	L 24–31 ^{2OT}	107,895
November 1	12:00 p.m.	Maryland	Beaver Stadium; University Park, PA (rivalry)	ESPN2	L 19–20	103,969
November 8	12:00 p.m.	at Indiana	Memorial Stadium; Bloomington, IN	BTN	W 13–7	42,683
November 15	12:00 p.m.	Temple*	Beaver Stadium; University Park, PA	ESPN2	W 30–13	100,173
November 22	12:00 p.m.	at Illinois	Memorial Stadium; Champaign, IL	ESPN2	L 14–16	35,172
November 29	3:30 p.m.	No. 10 Michigan State	Beaver Stadium; University Park, PA (rivalry)	ABC/ESPN2	L 10–34	99,902
December 27	4:30 p.m.	vs. Boston College*	Yankee Stadium; Bronx, NY (Pinstripe Bowl)	ESPN	W 31–30 ^{OT}	49,012
*Non-conference game; ^{†}Homecoming; Rankings from AP Poll released prior to the game; All times are in Eastern time

== Personnel ==
=== Roster ===
2014 Penn State Nittany Lions football team roster
Players
Coaches
Offense

Pos.	#	Name	Class
RB	1	Bill Belton	Sr
WR	2	Jake Kiley	So
WR	3	DeAndre Thompkins	Fr
WR	5	DaeSean Hamilton	Fr
WR	7	Geno Lewis	So
QB	9	Trace McSorley	Fr
TE	11	Brent Wilkerson	So
WR	12	Chris Godwin	Fr
WR	13	Saeed Blacknall	Fr
QB	14	Christian Hackenberg	So
QB	15	Michael O'Connor	Fr
QB	16	Billy Fessler	Fr
QB	17	DJ Crook	Fr
TE	18	Jesse James	Jr
RB	20	Johnathan Thomas	Fr
RB	22	Akeel Lynch	So
RB	23	Mark Allen	Fr
RB	24	Nick Scott	Fr
RB	28	Zach Zwinak	Sr
RB	29	Brandon Johnson	Jr
TE	30	Charles Idemudia	So
RB	31	Ronald Burgess	So
RB	32	Jack Haffner	So
RB	33	Cole Chiappialle	So
FB	34	Dominic Salomone	So
RB	36	Deron Thompson	Jr
FB	47	Brandon Smith	Fr
G	53	Derek Dowrey	So
C	55	Wendy Laurent	So
OT	58	Chance Sorrell	Fr
OT	59	Andrew Nelson	Fr
OT	60	Noah Beh	Fr
G	65	Miles Dieffenbach	Sr
C	66	Angelo Mangiro	Jr
G	67	Andrew Terlingo	Fr
OT	69	Adam De Boef	Fr
OT	70	Brendan Mahon	Fr
OT	71	Albert Hall	So
G	72	Brian Gaia	So
OL	73	Steve Myers	Fr
G	74	Evan Galimberti	Fr
OT	75	Brendan Brosnan	Fr
OT	76	Donovan Smith	Jr
OT	77	Chasz Wright	Fr
C	78	Tom Devenney	Fr
OT	79	Charlie Shuman	Fr
WR	80	Matt Zanellato	Jr
TE	81	Adam Breneman	So
WR	82	Gregg Garrity	So
WR	83	Luke Vadas	Fr
WR	84	Chris Geiss	Fr
WR	86	Deshawn Baker	Jr
TE	87	Kyle Carter	Jr
TE	88	Mike Gesicki	Fr
TE	89	Tom Pancoast	Fr

Defense

Pos.	#	Name	Class
CB	1	Christian Campbell	Fr
S	2	Marcus Allen	Fr
CB	3	Da'Quan Davis	Jr
S	4	Adrian Amos	Sr
LB	5	Nyeem Wartman	So
S	6	Malik Golden	So
LB	7	Koa Farmer	Fr
LB	8	Gary Wooten	So
CB	9	Jordan Lucas	Jr
CB	10	Trevor Williams	Jr
LB	11	Brandon Bell	Jr
CB	12	Jordan Smith	So
CB	13	Jesse Merise	Jr
CB	14	Kasey Gaines	Fr
CB	15	Grant Haley	Fr
CB	16	Devin Pryor	Jr
CB	17	Dad Poquie	So
DE	18	Deion Barnes	Jr
CB	19	Daquan Worley	Fr
LB	20	Jordan Dudas	Jr
CB	21	Amani Oruwariye	Fr
S	23	Ryan Keiser	Sr
S	24	Anthony Smith	So
LB	25	Von Walker	So
LB	26	Brandon Bell	So
S	27	Colin Harrop	So
S	28	Troy Apke	Fr
DE	31	Brad Bars	Sr
LB	35	Matthew Baney	Jr
CB	37	Kyle Alston	Fr
CB	38	Desi Davis	Fr
LB	38	Ben Kline	Jr
S	39	Jesse Della Valle	Sr
LB	40	Jason Cabinda	Fr
DT	41	Parker Cothren	Fr
LB	42	T.J. Rhattigan	Jr
LB	43	Mike Hull	Sr
LB	44	Troy Reeder	Fr
S	45	Bryant Harper	Jr
LB	46	Hunter Crafford	Fr
S	49	Brian Tomasetti	Fr
LB	50	Mike Wiand	Fr
LB	51	Drew Boyce	Jr
DE	52	Curtis Cothran	Fr
DE	86	C.J. Olaniyan	Sr
DT	88	Tyrone Smith	Sr
DE	90	Garrett Sickels	Fr
DT	91	Tarow Barney	Jr
DT	92	Joe Holmes	Fr
DT	93	Antoine White	Fr
DE	94	Evan Schwan	So
DE	95	Carl Nassib	Jr
DE	96	Torrence Brown	Fr
DT	98	Anthony Zettel	Jr
DT	99	Austin Johnson	So

Special teams

Pos.	#	Name	Class
K, P	37	Chris Gulla	Fr
SN	41	Zach Ladonis	So
SN	43	Kyle Vasey	Fr
SN	44	Tyler Yazujian	So
SN	54	Sean Corcoran	Fr
P	92	Daniel Pasquariello	Fr
P	93	Robby Liebel	Fr
K	97	Sam Ficken	Sr
K	99	Joey Julius	Fr

Head coach

- James Franklin

Coordinators/assistant coaches

- Bob Shoop (defensive coordinator/safeties)
- John Donovan (offensive coordinator/tight ends)
- Charles Huff (running backs/special teams coordinator)
- Brent Pry (assistant head coach/co-defensive coordinator/linebackers)
- Ricky Rahne (quarterbacks/passing game coordinator)
- Josh Gattis (wide receivers/offensive recruiting coordinator)
- Terry Smith (cornerbacks/defensive recruiting coordinator)
- Herb Hand (run game coordinator/offensive line)
- Sean Spencer (defensive line)
- Dwight Galt (strength and conditioning)
- Tyler Bowen (graduate assistant)
- Bobby Snopek (graduate assistant)
- Steve Williams (graduate assistant)
- Will Windham (graduate assistant)

Legend

- (C) Team captain
- (S) Suspended
- (I) Ineligible
- Injured
- Redshirt

=== Coaching staff ===
Position	Name	Year	Alma mater
Head coach	James Franklin	2014	East Stroudsburg (1994)
Defensive coordinator/Safeties	Bob Shoop	2014	Yale (1988)
Offensive coordinator/tight ends	John Donovan	2014	Johns Hopkins (1997)
Linebackers/assistant head coach	Brent Pry	2014	Buffalo (1993)
Running backs/Special teams coordinator	Charles Huff	2014	Hampton (2005)
Quarterbacks/Passing Game Coordinator	Ricky Rahne	2014	Cornell (2002)
Wide receivers/offensive Recruiting coordinator	Josh Gattis	2014	Wake Forest (2006)
Cornerbacks/defensive Recruiting coordinator	Terry Smith	2014	Penn State (1991)
Offensive line/Run Game Coordinator	Herb Hand	2014	Hamilton College (1990)
Defensive line	Sean Spencer	2014	Clarion (1995)
Strength and Conditioning	Dwight Galt	2014	Maryland (1981)
Graduate Assistant	Tyler Bowen	2014	Maryland (2010)
Graduate Assistant	Bobby Snopek	2014	Penn State (2013)
Graduate Assistant	Steven Williams	2014	Harvard University (2008)
Graduate Assistant	Will Windham	2014	Mississippi State University (2007)

=== Depth chart ===
Penn State's opening week depth chart:

Defense

FS
Ryan Keiser
Jesse Della Valle

WLB	MLB	SLB
Brandon Bell	Mike Hull	Nyeem Wartman
Von Walker	Gary Wooten	Jason Cabinda

SS
Adrian Amos
Malik Golden

CB
Jordan Lucas
Grant Haley

DE	DT	DT	DE
C. J. Olaniyan	Austin Johnson	Anthony Zettel	Deion Barnes
Carl Nassib	Parker Cothren	Tyrone Smith	Brad Bars

CB
Trevor Williams
Da'Quan Davis

Offense

WR
Geno Lewis
Saeed Blacknall

WR
Chris Godwin
Luke Vadas

LT	LG	C	RG	RT
Donovan Smith	Derek Dowrey OR	Angelo Mangiro	Brian Gaia	Andrew Nelson
Albert Hall	Brendan Mahon	Wendy Laurent	Tom Devenney	Chasz Wright

TE
Jesse James
Kyle Carter

WR
DaeSean Hamilton
Matt Zanellato

QB
Christian Hackenberg
Trace McSorley

Key reserves
RB Akeel Lynch
TE Mike Gesicki
TE Brent Wilkerson
OL Anthony Alosi
DE Evan Schwan
DE Garrett Sickels
LB Jordan Dudas
CB Jordan Smith

Special teams
PK Sam Ficken
P Chris Gulla
KR Akeel Lynch, Geno Lewis
PR Jordan Lucas, Jesse Della Valle
LS Zach Ladonis
H Tyler Yazujian

RB
Bill Belton
Zach Zwinak

== Sanctions reduction ==
The NCAA announced on Monday, September 8, two days after Penn State beat Akron, that effective immediately, Penn State's ban from postseason play levied in wake of the Penn State child sex abuse scandal would be terminated, and that by the 2015 season, it would have its full complement of scholarships. The decision came in response to a recommendation from former United States Senator George Mitchell, Penn State's athletic integrity monitor, who concluded Penn State's current players should not be held responsible for organizational misgivings of the past. Ultimately, the NCAA's executive committee concurred, and eliminated the sanctions. Former Penn State assistant coach Jay Paterno – son of Joe Paterno, Penn State's coach for decades – lambasted the NCAA, opining that "the truth of the matter," is that the NCAA is utilizing the report from Senator Mitchell "as cover to reduce the sanctions that were never warranted in the first place." Coach James Franklin commented,

"We did bring the 49 guys who stayed (the remaining 49 players who were on the roster when sanctions were announced in July 2012) to the front, and the rest of the guys gave them a standing ovation. They were here for our program when we needed them most. You could even mention some of the recruits. Hackenberg and Breneman are two guys who kind of held the recruiting class together. I don't think there's any doubt that those 49 guys will forever be remembered. They didn't take a shortcut. Those guys are a perfect example of that. It's also an example that if you just work hard and keep a positive attitude and persevere, good things happen. I'm happy those 49 guys can be rewarded for the commitment they showed to this program."

— James Franklin, September 9, 2014

== Game summaries ==
=== Vs. UCF (Croke Park Classic) ===
2014 Croke Park Classic
Penn State Nittany Lions vs. UCF Knights – Game summary

Quarter	1	2	3	4	Total
Nittany Lions	7	3	10	6	26
Knights	0	3	7	14	24

at Croke Park, Dublin, Ireland

- Date: August 30
- Game time: 8:30 a.m. EDT / 1:30 p.m. IST
- Game weather: Cloudy, 60 °F (16 °C)
- Game attendance: 53,304
- Referee: Todd LaPenta
- TV announcers (ESPN2): Mike Patrick, Ed Cunningham, Jeannine Edwards
- ESPN Box Score

Game information

First quarter

- PSU – Zach Zwinak 1-yard run (Sam Ficken kick), 8:20. Nittany Lions 7–0.

Second quarter

- UCF – Shawn Moffitt 36-yard field goal, 12:26. Nittany Lions 7–3.
- PSU – Sam Ficken 22-yard field goal, 6:20. Nittany Lions 10–3.

Third quarter

- PSU – Sam Ficken 33-yard field goal, 6:56. Nittany Lions 13–3.
- UCF – Justin Holman 1-yard run, Moffitt XP good, 2:39 (PSU 13–10)
- PSU – Geno Lewis 79-yard pass from Christian Hackenberg (Sam Ficken kick), 0:55. Nittany Lions 20–10.

Fourth quarter

- UCF – Joshua Reese 10-yard pass from Justin Holman (Shawn Moffitt kick), 11:31. Nittany Lions 20–17.
- PSU – Sam Ficken 24-yard field goal, 3:30. Nittany Lions 23–17.
- UCF – Justin Holman 6-yard run (Shawn Moffitt kick), 1:13. Knights 24–23.
- PSU – Sam Ficken 36-yard field goal, 0:00. Nittany Lions 26–24.

Top passer

- PSU – Christian Hackenberg – 32/47, 454 yards, TD, 2 INT
- UCF – Justin Holman – 9/14, 204 yards, TD

Top rushers

- PSU – Zach Zwinak – 12 rushes, 32 yards, TD
- UCF – Dontravious Wilson – 21 rushes, 34 yards

Top receiver

- PSU – Geno Lewis – 8 receptions, 173 yards, TD
- UCF – J. J. Worton – 5 receptions, 83 yards

Note: Though the game was held at a neutral site, Penn State wore white uniforms and was considered the away team.

"UCF should wax 'em good."

— Lee Corso on a talk radio show in South Florida when discussing the game

When the two teams met in the preceding season, UCF downed Penn State 34–31. However, both teams experienced significant changes since the game, most notably for UCF, the loss of their quarterback Blake Bortles, who chose to forgo his final season of college football and enter the 2014 NFL draft. Consequently, UCF had to find a new quarterback, and auditioned several candidates before ultimately settling on Peter DiNovo, a redshirt freshman. Aside from the coaching change in which James Franklin replaced Bill O'Brien, perhaps Penn State's biggest on-field change was the improvement of their defensive secondary, which was a major contributing factor to their loss in 2013, but was expected to be a strength in the 2014 matchup. In regards to predicting the outcome of the game, ESPN analyst Lee Corso made headlines when he predicted UCF would "wax" Penn State. Three of four panelists from the Big Ten Network predicted Penn State would emerge victorious, while a panel of college football writers from ESPN were split on who the victor would be, with three selecting Penn State and two selecting UCF.

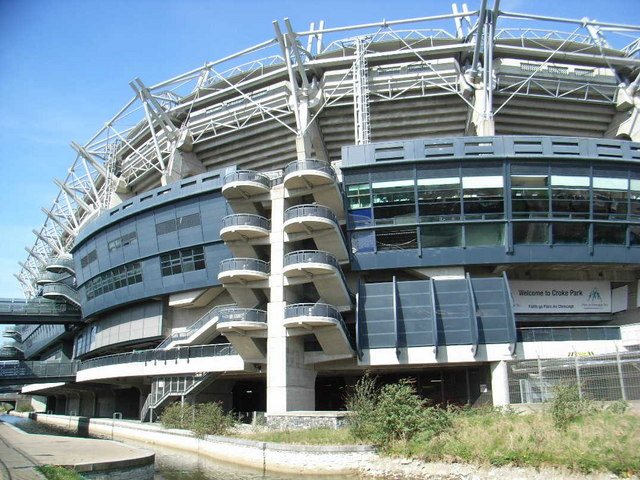
The game was held at Croke Park in Dublin, Ireland

The game kicked off at 1:31 p.m. local time in Dublin, and Sam Ficken booted it deep for the Nittany Lions. UCF went three-and-out on their first possession, while Penn State, aided by a running into the kicker penalty on fourth down to keep the drive alive, scored a touchdown via a one-yard Zach Zwinak rush on theirs. UCF started their ensuing drive in field goal range thanks to a 68-yard kickoff return, but failed to capitalize, ultimately turning the ball over on downs at the goal line. Penn State's subsequent drive ended when Christian Hackenberg threw an interception. In the second quarter, UCF scored for the first time when their star kicker Shawn Moffitt made a 36-yard field goal, which made the score 7–3. Penn State responded, though, executing a 15-play, 72-yard drive that took 6:06 and culminated with a 22-yard field goal from Ficken after Penn State could not score a touchdown deep in the red zone. Neither team scored for the remainder of the first half. The teams exchanged punts to begin the second half, but on Penn State's second drive, they managed a field goal from Ficken after five plays netted them 43 yards (including a 38-yard pass from Hackenberg to DaeSean Hamilton). UCF responded on their ensuing drive when Justin Holman – UCF's backup quarterback who entered after starter Peter DiNovo was benched by coach George O'Leary – rushed for a 1-yard touchdown to make the score 13–10 Penn State. The Nittany Lions wasted little time to re-extend their lead, taking only three plays to drive 72 yards for a touchdown, scoring via a 79-yard pass from Hackenberg to Geno Lewis making the score 20–10 near the end of the third quarter. UCF struck right back early in the fourth quarter with a 10-yard touchdown pass from Holman to Josh Reese that put the Knights back within three. The next three drives – two for Penn State and one for UCF – ended in turnovers (an interception and lost fumble respectively for Penn State, and a lost fumble for UCF). After UCF punted on the ensuing drive following Penn State's fumble, Penn State embarked on a 10-play, 58-yard drive that culminated with a 24-yard field goal for Ficken, his third of the game, which made the score 23–17 with 3:30 to play. However, UCF subsequently marched down the field and scored on a 6-yard run by Holman that put them ahead by one with 1:13 remaining. Penn State ultimately emerged victorious, though, executing a drive that included a fourth down conversion, and ended with Ficken's fourth field goal of the day, a 36-yard kick as time expired, giving Penn State the 26–24 victory in their season opener.

Penn State's offense was key in the victory. Led by Hackenberg, who set a school record by throwing for 454 yards, the unit achieved 511 total yards, and were successful on 10 of 18 chances for third down conversions, improving upon an Achilles' heel from their 2013 season. The offensive line, which had four of its five members starting their first game, also had a strong performance, alleviating a concern for Penn State entering the game. Penn State employed an aggressive strategy that, despite at times being too convoluted for their own good, ultimately worked for them, according to one sportswriter. Two Penn State players earned additional recognition for their strong opening-week performances: place kicker Sam Ficken was named the Big Ten conference's special teams player of the week for making four of four field goal attempts including the game-winner at the end of regulation, and wide receiver DaeSean Hamilton was named the conference's co-freshman of the week for making 11 receptions for 165 yards, both of which broke Penn State freshman records.

=== Akron ===
Akron Zips at Penn State Nittany Lions – Game summary

Quarter	1	2	3	4	Total
Zips	0	0	3	0	3
Nittany Lions	7	0	7	7	21

at Beaver Stadium, University Park, Pennsylvania

- Date: September 6
- Game time: 12:00 p.m. EDT
- Game weather: Scattered clouds, 82 °F (28 °C)
- Game attendance: 97,354
- Referee: Todd Geerlings
- TV announcers (ABC/ESPN2): Mike Patrick, Ed Cunningham, Jeannine Edwards
- ESPN Box Score

Game information

First quarter

- PSU – Bill Belton, 22 yard pass from Christian Hackenberg, Sam Ficken XP good, 2:58 (PSU 7–0)

Second quarter

- No scoring

Third quarter

- UA – Robert Stein, 28 yard field goal, 11:11 (PSU 7–3)
- PSU – Jesse James, 13 yard pass from Hackenberg, Ficken XP good, 2:38 (PSU 14–3)

Fourth quarter

- PSU – James, 44 yard pass from Hackenberg, Ficken XP good, 8:58 (PSU 21–3)

Top passer

- AKR – Kyle Pohl – 24/46, 208 yards
- PSU – Christian Hackenberg – 22/36, 319 yards, 3 TD, 2 INT

Top rushers

- AKR – Jawon Chisholm – 7 rushes, 30 yards
- PSU – Akeel Lynch – 7 rushes, 45 yards

Top receiver

- AKR – Zach D'Orazio – 5 receptions, 61 yards
- PSU – Geno Lewis – 6 receptions, 98 yards

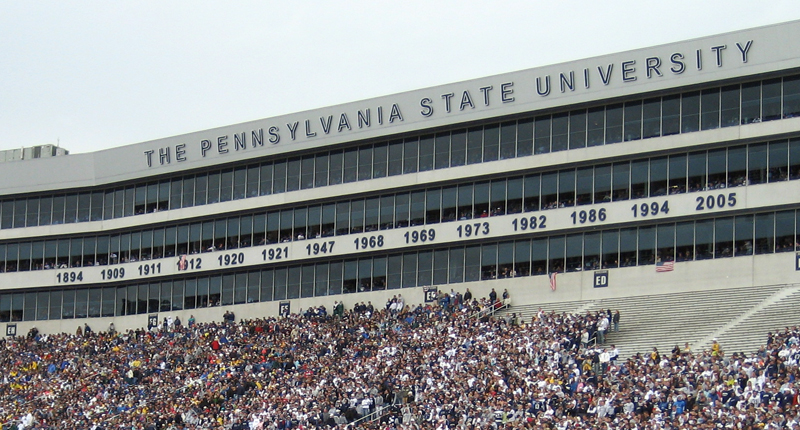
Penn State played their first of seven games at Beaver Stadium on September 6

A "rapidly improving program", Akron entered their first game of the season led by quarterback Kyle Pohl, who sought to continue positive development after a strong sophomore season, but would need a strong performance from his offensive line, which predominantly consisted of new starters. One key for Akron entering the game was containing Penn State's tenacious pass rush. The Nittany Lions sought to improve their running game, which managed only 54 yards in the first game. Frank Bodani of the York Daily Record gave Penn State the edge on offense, defense, special teams, and intangibles, but Akron the edge on coaching, ultimately predicting the Nittany Lions would emerge victorious. All four Big Ten Network panelists predicted Penn State would win, but writer Tom Dienhart did note that Penn State should not become complacent, as Akron would have nothing to lose.

Akron received the opening kickoff, and methodically moved down the field before their drive stalled in the red zone, at which point kicker Tom O'Leary missed a 31-yard field goal attempt. On Penn State's ensuing drive, they achieved one first down before Christian Hackenberg threw three consecutive incomplete passes, forcing a punt. Subsequently, Akron went three-and-out. Starting with solid field position, Penn State benefited from three plays exceeding 15 yards on the next drive, including a 22-yard touchdown pass from Hackenberg to Bill Belton, giving Penn State an early 7–0 lead. After Akron went three-and-out once again to close the first quarter, Penn State's first drive of the second quarter ended when Hackenberg threw an interception to Martel Durant of Akron. Akron failed to capitalize, and the two teams exchanged punts thrice to close the half. Penn State opened the second half by fumbling, giving Akron the ball in plus territory. (Note: Field position which gives the offense less than 50 yards to the end zone at which they score) Akron finally scored when Robert Stein connected on a 28-yard field goal attempt, which made the score 7–3. After the teams exchanged punts, Penn State embarked on a 10-play, 79-yard drive that encapsulated 5:26, and reached fruition when Hackenberg completed a 13-yard touchdown pass to tight end Jesse James, giving Penn State an 11-point lead. Akron's next drive ended with another punt, and at the end of the third quarter, Penn State led 14–3. Penn State possessed the ball to start the fourth quarter, but their possession terminated when Hackenberg threw his second interception of the game, this time to Bre' Ford. Akron failed to even achieve a first down on their ensuing position, as they failed to convert a fourth down and one situation, being knocked back for a loss of two yards. Penn State managed to score in just two plays thereafter; Hackenberg threw a 44-yard touchdown pass to James, which gave Penn State an 18-point advantage. Akron executed 15 plays and gained 67 yards on their next drive, but could not score, turning the ball over, and thus giving Penn State the 21–3 victory.

Penn State's defense excelled in the victory; it managed to avoid surrendering big plays, and was tough in short yardage situations, two key factors as it stymied Akron's offense, which was effective in the short passing game, but ultimately struggled against the relentless, attacking defense of Penn State. Penn State's offense turned the ball over thrice, and was relatively erratic in the running game aside from Akeel Lynch, the third running back, who was the team's most consistent rusher through the first two weeks of the season. Punter Chris Gulla also received accolade for his strong performance, averaging 48.8 yards on five punts.

=== At Rutgers ===
Penn State Nittany Lions at Rutgers Scarlet Knights – Game summary

Quarter	1	2	3	4	Total
Nittany Lions	0	0	3	10	13
Scarlet Knights	0	10	0	0	10

at High Point Solutions Stadium, Piscataway, New Jersey

- Date: September 13
- Game time: 8:00 p.m. EDT
- Game weather: Scattered clouds, 63 °F (17 °C)
- Game attendance: 53,774
- Referee: David Witvoet
- TV announcers (BTN): Kevin Kugler, Shaun O'Hara, Tina Cervasio
- ESPN Box Score

Game information

First quarter

- No scoring plays

Second quarter

- RUTG – Gary Nova 14-yard run (Kyle Federico kick), 11:32. Scarlet Knights 7–0.
- RUTG – Kyle Federico 32-yard field goal, 0:12. Scarlet Knights 10–0.

Third quarter

- PSU – Sam Ficken 32-yard field goal, 3:45. Scarlet Knights 10–3.

Fourth quarter

- PSU – Sam Ficken 25-yard field goal, 13:00. Scarlet Knights 10–6.
- PSU – Bill Belton 5-yard run (Sam Ficken kick), 1:13. Nittany Lions 13–10.

Top passer

- PSU – Christian Hackenberg – 25/44, 309 yards, INT
- RUTG – Gary Nova – 15/30, 192 yards, 5 INT

Top rushers

- PSU – Bill Belton – 15 rushes, 36 yards
- RUTG – Paul James – 14 rushes, 51 yards

Top receiver

- PSU – Geno Lewis – 6 receptions, 109 yards
- RUTG – Leonte Carroo – 6 receptions, 84 yards

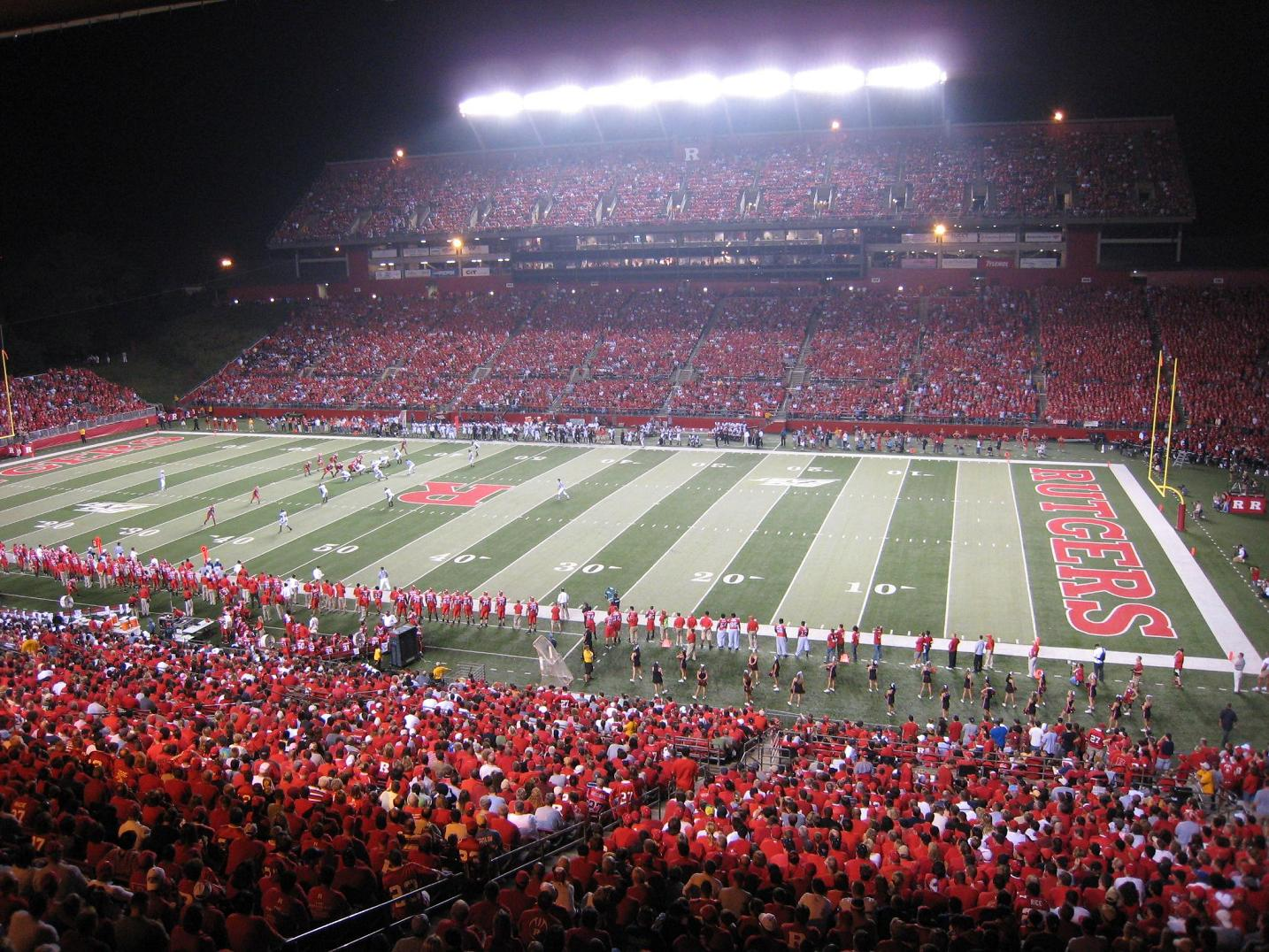
The night game was held at High Point Solutions Stadium (pictured)

"Billed as one of the biggest, if not the biggest, game in the history of Rutgers football," Penn State traveled to Piscataway, New Jersey for Rutgers' first conference game as a member of the Big Ten. Some players, coaches, and observers felt that Rutgers and Penn State could be rivals in the future if the game was close and intense, noting animosity between the two teams in facets such as recruiting. Both teams entered the game having won their first two. Rutgers looked to establish their running game offensively with Paul James, while Penn State yearned for consistency among their trio of running backs. Penn State sought to pressure Rutgers' quarterback Gary Nova to force him to turn the ball over, while Rutgers sought to pursue a similar strategy to pressure Christian Hackenberg. A panel from NJ.com, the website for The Star Ledger, had two writers predict Rutgers would win, and one predict Penn State would win. Three of four Big Ten Network panelists also selected the Scarlet Knights, but four of five panelists from ESPN's Big Ten blog selected Penn State.

Penn State won the coin toss and received the opening kickoff. Their first drive spanned seven plays and 33 yards, but ended without points when they elected to punt rather than attempt a long field goal. The teams exchanged punts over their next two drives. When Rutgers got the ball back, their drive ended quickly when, on the fourth play, Gary Nova threw his first of five interceptions – Trevor Williams recorded the interception for the Nittany Lions. Penn State failed to capitalize, going three-and-out on their ensuing drive. Rutgers next drive lasted only one play; Nova's pass was intercepted by Adrian Amos, setting Penn State up to start their drive already on the outskirts of field goal range. Two penalties inhibited Penn State's offense, and they were forced to settle for a field goal attempt by Sam Ficken, which was blocked. There was no score at the end of the first quarter. Rutgers scored on their first drive of the second quarter; their 10-play, 80-yard drive culminated when Nova rushed for a 14-yard touchdown. Penn State was forced to punt on their ensuing drive; the punt was blocked, setting up Rutgers with good field position. However, they went three-and-out; Penn State punted on their next drive as well. On the last consequential drive of the half, Rutgers executed 14 plays and gained 78 yards, but was forced to settle for a field goal, which made the score 10–0 at half time. Each of the first three drives of the second half ended in punts, two by Rutgers and one by Penn State. On Penn State's second drive of the half, Hackenberg threw an interception. On the next play, Williams grabbed his second interception to give the ball right back to Penn State. Subsequently, Penn State executed 13 plays in which they gained 72 yards, encapsulating five minutes and 18 seconds of clock; Ficken made a 32-yard field goal to pull Penn State within a touchdown. Two penalties decimated Rutgers' ensuing drive, and they punted. Rutgers led 10–3 at the end of the quarter. Penn State's opening drive of the quarter ended with another field goal, moving them within four points. Thereafter, the teams exchanged punts. Nova threw his fourth interception on the first play of their next drive, but Penn State failed to capitalize, and was forced to punt. Rutgers' next drive also ended with a punt, so Penn State got the ball back with 3:02 to play, down by four points. The drive began with a 53-yard pass from Hackenberg to Geno Lewis that put Penn State within striking distance. Three plays later, they appeared to score on a pass from Hackenberg to Jesse James, but a holding penalty nullified the play, and Penn State was pushed back. Lewis caught a 23-yard pass on the next play that put Penn State inside the 10 yard line. Two plays later, Bill Belton rushed for a five-yard touchdown, and Penn State took a 13–10 lead, the score by which they won when Ryan Keiser clinched the victory with an interception, the fifth Nova threw.

Penn State handed Rutgers a "devastating" loss in which their quarterback, Gary Nova, admitted to letting his team down by throwing five interceptions in an ugly game. James Franklin conceded that Penn State's offense was "not pretty" and continued to struggle to establish the running game, but remained "confident". Columnist Bob Flounders noted the rapport that has developed between Christian Hackenberg and Geno Lewis, and its manifestation late in games when Penn State needs a big play. However, Penn State's inability to establish the running game coupled with poor pass protection led Mike Gross to call the offensive line's performance one of the worst in Penn State history. The defense was strong for the Nittany Lions, compiling five interceptions, seven tackles for a loss, and three sacks; although it allowed a few big plays, they generally stopped Rutgers from offensive momentum. One writer opined that the turnovers masked some offensive success for Rutgers; nevertheless, they were strong.

=== UMass ===
UMass Minutemen at Penn State Nittany Lions – Game summary

Quarter	1	2	3	4	Total
Minutemen	0	0	0	7	7
Nittany Lions	6	28	14	0	48

at Beaver Stadium, University Park, Pennsylvania

- Date: September 20
- Game time: 4:00 p.m. EDT
- Game weather: Clear and breezy, 76 °F (24 °C)
- Game attendance: 99,155
- Referee: Tony Cannella
- TV announcers (BTN): Kevin Kugler, Glen Mason, Lisa Byington
- ESPN Box Score

Game information

First quarter

- PSU – Sam Ficken, 42 yard field goal, 6:17 (PSU 3–0)
- PSU – Ficken, 40 yard field goal, 2:38 (PSU 6–0)

Second quarter

- PSU – Bill Belton, 24 yard run, Ficken XP good, 10:11 (PSU 13–0)
- PSU – Belton, 20 yard run, Ficken XP good, 8:48 (PSU 20–0)
- PSU – Zach Zwinak, 5 yard run, Ficken XP good, 3:37 (PSU 27–0)
- PSU – Zwinak, 2 yard run, Ficken XP good, 1:24 (PSU 34–0)

Third quarter

- PSU – Akeel Lynch, 15 yard run, Ficken XP good, 8:10 (PSU 41–0)
- PSU – Brent Wilkerson, 11 yard pass from D.J. Crook, Ficken XP good, 0:17 (PSU 48–0)

Fourth quarter

- MASS – Tajae Sharpe, 77 yard pass from Blake Frohnapfel, Matthew Wylie XP good, 14:47 (PSU 48–7)

Top passer

- MASS – Blake Frohnapfel – 17/33, 264 yards, TD
- PSU – Christian Hackenberg – 12/23, 179 yards

Top rushers

- MASS – Alex Kenney – 2 rushes, 22 yards
- PSU – Akeel Lynch – 8 rushes, 81 yards

Top receiver

- MASS – Marken Michel – 6 receptions, 104 yards
- PSU – Geno Lewis – 5 receptions, 82 yards

In the teams' first ever meeting, Penn State was expected to handily defeat Massachusetts (UMass), which was 0–3 entering the game. Although UMass's offense was capable of scoring many points despite a lackluster rushing attack, the Nittany Lions' tenacious run defense and solid pass rush ostensibly inhibited much chance of offensive success for the Minutemen. Penn State defensive tackle Anthony Zettel was a key for the Nittany Lions' defense; he entered the game among the NCAA's leader in tackles for loss. Offensively, the Nittany Lions sought to continue their quest in establishing a running game with solid offensive line play. Penn State was a 30-point favorite to win, and was unanimously selected as the winner by prognosticators from Big Ten Network and ESPN's Big Ten blog.

Penn State received the opening kickoff after winning the coin toss, and promptly went three-and-out after a short running play and two incomplete passes from Christian Hackenberg. After an 18-yard run on first down by former Penn State receiver Alex Kenney, UMass's offense sputtered, and they ultimately missed a field goal. Penn State drove 15 plays for 53 yards on their next possession, and Sam Ficken kicked a 42-yard field goal to give Penn State an early 3–0 lead. Massachusetts went three-and-out on their next drive, and Penn State capitalized with another field goal, this time a 40-yard kick. At the end of the first quarter, Penn State led 6–0. UMass's first drive of the second quarter ended on a failed fourth down conversion attempt. Subsequently, Penn State executed eight plays for 69 yards, and scored via a 24-yard touchdown run from Bill Belton, making the score 13–0. UMass fumbled on their ensuing possession, and it took Penn State only two more plays to score; Belton rushed for a 20-yard touchdown. Down 20 points, UMass's offense took the field needing to score, but failed to do so, punting the ball back to Penn State, who scored their third touchdown of the quarter when Zach Zwinak rushed for a 5-yard touchdown to make the score 27–0. UMass went three-and-out, and Zwinak rushed for one more touchdown before the half, a 1-yard run. Penn State led 34–0 at the half. UMass went three-and-out to begin the second half, and Penn State's offensive dominance continued when Akeel Lynch rushed for a 15-yard touchdown off a play from the wildcat formation, giving Penn State a 41–0 lead. UMass's next drive stalled, and Penn State took the field with their second-string offense, anchored by D. J. Crook at quarterback and Cole Chiappialle at running back. On that drive, Crook threw an 11-yard touchdown pass to backup tight end Brent Wilkerson, giving Penn State the 48–0 lead at the end of the third quarter. UMass finally scored on the first play of the fourth quarter when Blake Frohnapfel completed a 77-yard pass to Tajae Sharpe, making the score 48–7, which ultimately was the final score. The teams exchanged punts thereafter; subsequently, UMass turned the ball over on downs, and Penn State exhausted the clock with the running game to secure the victory.

"A game that Penn State essentially turned into a public practice", Penn State "steamrolled" the Minutemen, dominating on both sides of the football, especially at the line of scrimmage, which fostered a powerful rushing attack that achieved 218 yards, a season-high. Massachusetts' coach Mark Whipple commented that his team played as if they were intimidated by the Nittany Lions, and were decimated by mental mistakes. Penn State's offensive line, which featured a slightly different lineup than it had in its first three games, excelled, and controlled the line of scrimmage; right tackle Andrew Nelson noted that it "feels good to dominate, which I think we did today." Defensively, the Lions' success continued; the defensive line led the unit by creating pressure and penetration in the backfield, allowing linebackers and safeties simply to "clean up" whatever managed to get past the line.

=== Northwestern ===
Northwestern Wildcats at Penn State Nittany Lions – Game summary

Quarter	1	2	3	4	Total
Wildcats	14	0	0	15	29
Nittany Lions	0	3	3	0	6

at Beaver Stadium, University Park, Pennsylvania

- Date: September 27
- Game time: 12:00 p.m. EDT
- Game weather: Mostly sunny, 72 °F (22 °C)
- Game attendance: 102,910
- Referee: Shawn Smith
- TV announcers (BTN): Eric Collins (play-by-play), J Leman (analyst), Tina Cervasio (sideline)
- ESPN Box Score

Game information

First quarter

- NW – Trevor Siemian, 1 yard run, Jack Mitchell XP good, 9:29 (NU 7–0)
- NW – Siemian, 1 yard run, Mitchell XP good, 4:38 (NU 14–0)

Second quarter

- PSU – Sam Ficken, 42 yard field goal, 0:05 (NU 14–3)

Third quarter

- PSU – Ficken, 36 yard field goal, 11:17 (NU 14–6)

Fourth quarter

- NW – Anthony Walker 49-yard interception return, Mitchell XP no good, 14:49 (NU 20–6)
- NW – Mitchell, 23 yard field goal, 13:06 (NU 23–6)
- NW – Siemian, 1 yard run, Mitchell XP no good, 7:22 (NU 29–6)

Top passer

- NW – Trevor Siemian – 21/37, 258 yards, INT
- PSU – Christian Hackenberg – 22/45, 216 yards, INT

Top rusher

- NW – Justin Jackson – 15 rushes, 50 yards
- PSU – Bill Belton – 8 rushes, 35 yards

Top receiver

- NW – Danny Vitale – 7 receptions, 113 yards
- PSU – DaeSean Hamilton – 6 receptions, 100 yards

Penn State entered the game relying on its rush defense, the best in the NCAA, to stop Northwestern's rushing attack, which was the key to its offense. Northwestern's offense, although led by a "sharp, effective quarterback" in Trevor Siemian, was without many playmakers, as star running back Venric Mark transferred in the offseason, and multiple wide receivers were injured. As such, Penn State ostensibly had the edge when Northwestern possessed the football. Offensively for Penn State, Christian Hackenberg sought to bounce back after an inconsistent performance against Massachusetts. However, Northwestern had a solid pass rush and looked to pressure Hackenberg. Penn State also planned to continue working on their rushing attack. York Daily Record columnist Frank Bodani predicted that Northwestern would utilize a "bend-but-don't-break approach" to avoid relinquishing big plays. Panelists from ESPN's Big Ten Blog unanimously selected the Lions to defeat the Wildcats, as did the panelists from Big Ten Network. Because of homecoming, Penn State took their names off their jerseys to pay homage to a long-standing Penn State tradition. Nyeem Wartman, Penn State's starting outside linebacker, had his arm in a sling before the game and did not dress for the game. There was no indication prior to the game that he was injured.

Northwestern received the opening kickoff, and moved the ball down the field into field goal range, but a chop block nullified a chance of continuing to move towards a touchdown, and forced them to attempt a 44-yard field goal, which Jack Mitchell missed. Penn State's ensuing drive went three-and-out; on the punt, Northwestern returned the ball beyond the line of scrimmage from which Penn State punted. Starting at the 31 yard line, Northwestern moved the ball to the one yard line, from which Trevor Siemian scored via a quarterback sneak, the first points Penn State's defense relinquished in the first quarter all season. Penn State went three-and-out again on their second drive. Northwestern's offensive success continued as they methodically moved down the field, and scored via another run from Siemian.. Northwestern led 14–0 before Penn State had achieved a first down. Penn State endured another three-and-out, ended with a sack of Christian Hackenberg. After narrowly missing blocking a punt, Northwestern started at Penn State's 29 yard line. They promptly advanced into the red zone, and after the drive stalled, attempted a fake field goal, but Mike Hull made a huge hit to stop the play, giving Penn State some momentum in the waning moments of the first quarter. Finally, as the first quarter ended, Penn State converted a third down and two, and recorded their first first down of the game. However, the drive ended thereafter, and Penn State punted. After a delay of game penalty decimated any opportunity to convert a fourth down, and they had to punt. On the next two possessions, each team went three-and-out, and punted. Faced with a fourth down and one at their own 31 yard line, Hackenberg took a quarterback sneak to get the first down. After that, Hackenberg completed a 51-yard pass to DaeSean Hamilton, moving Penn State across their own 40 yard line for the first time, and into the red zone, but settled for a field goal attempt, which was blocked. Northwestern's ensuing drive ended with a punt, and Penn State got the ball back with 1:28 to play. The drive was ostensibly over, but on Chris Gulla's punt, there was a personal foul, roughing the punter penalty called on Northwestern, giving Penn State a first down. Executing the two-minute drill, the Lions moved into field goal range, and Ficken came onto attempt a 42-yard field goal, which he made with five seconds remaining in the half. At the half, Penn State had only seven rushing yards, and their leading rusher was Hackenberg, whose six rushes totaled four yards. Penn State got the ball to start the second half, and went three-and-out. Northwestern also punted, and Jesse Della Valle notched a 41-yard return to the Northwestern 30 yard line. After badly executing on their subsequent possession, they settled for a 36-yard field goal from Ficken to pull within eight points, thus making it a one-possession game. The Wildcats moved the ball down the field with ease early in the drive before Penn State got pressure on Siemian, and he threw an interception to Penn State's Adrian Amos. Penn State achieved several first downs before being faced with a fourth down and two at the 35 yard line, which they failed to convert, and thus turned the ball over on downs. Northwestern subsequently went three-and-out, and punted. Penn State achieved some yardage on the drive, but a clipping penalty on Zach Zwinak decimated the drive. Meanwhile, Northwestern's Matthew Harris went down with an injury, and was taken off the field on a backboard, delaying the game for several minutes. Penn State punted, as did Northwestern on its next drive. At the end of the third quarter, Penn State had the ball, but trailed by eight points. The first play of the fourth quarter was an interception returned for a touchdown by Anthony Walker, giving Northwestern a 20–6 lead (the extra point was no good). On the first play of the next drive, Hackenberg was sacked, fumbled the ball, and Northwestern recovered, already in the red zone. They could not achieve a first down, and Mitchell made a 23-yard field goal, which made it a three-possession game, ahead 23–6. Penn State faced a fourth down and short situation at their own 30 yard line with 11:21 to play; they lost yardage on a rushing play, and gave the ball back to Northwestern. Northwestern capitalized when Siemian scored his third rushing touchdown of the day, but once again, the extra point was no good. Penn State turned the ball over on downs on their subsequent drive. Thus ended the scoring, and the Wildcats defeated Penn State 29–6.

=== At Michigan ===
Penn State Nittany Lions at Michigan Wolverines – Game summary

Quarter	1	2	3	4	Total
Nittany Lions	6	7	0	0	13
Wolverines	7	3	3	5	18

at Michigan Stadium, Ann Arbor, Michigan

- Date: October 11
- Game time: 7:00 p.m. EDT
- Game weather: Clear, 53 °F (12 °C)
- Game attendance: 113,085
- Referee: David Witvoet
- TV announcers (ESPN2): Mark Jones (play-by-play), Rod Gilmore (analyst), Jessica Mendoza (sideline)
- ESPN Box Score

Game information

First quarter

- PSU – Sam Ficken, 35 yard field goal, 9:28 (PSU 3–0)
- UM – Devin Funchess, 43 yard touchdown pass from Devin Gardner, Matt Wile XP good, 6:37 (UM 7–3)
- PSU – Ficken, 32 yard field goal, 0:52 (UM 7–6)

Second quarter

- PSU – DaeSean Hamilton, 10 yard touchdown pass from Christian Hackenberg, Ficken XP good, 11:58 (PSU 13–6)
- UM – Wile, 45 yard field goal, 5:08 (PSU 13–10)

Third quarter

- UM – Wile, 42 yard field goal, 2:30 (TIE 13–13)

Fourth quarter

- UM – Wile, 37 yard field goal, 11:24 (UM 16–13)
- UM – Penn State snaps punt out of end zone for safety, 1:41 (UM 18–13)

Top passer

- PSU – Christian Hackenberg – 21/32, 160 yards, TD, INT
- MICH – Devin Gardner – 16/24, 192 yards, TD, INT

Top rusher

- PSU – Bill Belton – 14 rushes, 69 yards
- MICH – De'Veon Smith – 12 rushes, 24 yards

Top receiver

- PSU – DaeSean Hamilton – 7 receptions, 58 yards, TD
- MICH – Devin Funchess – 7 receptions, 69 yards, TD

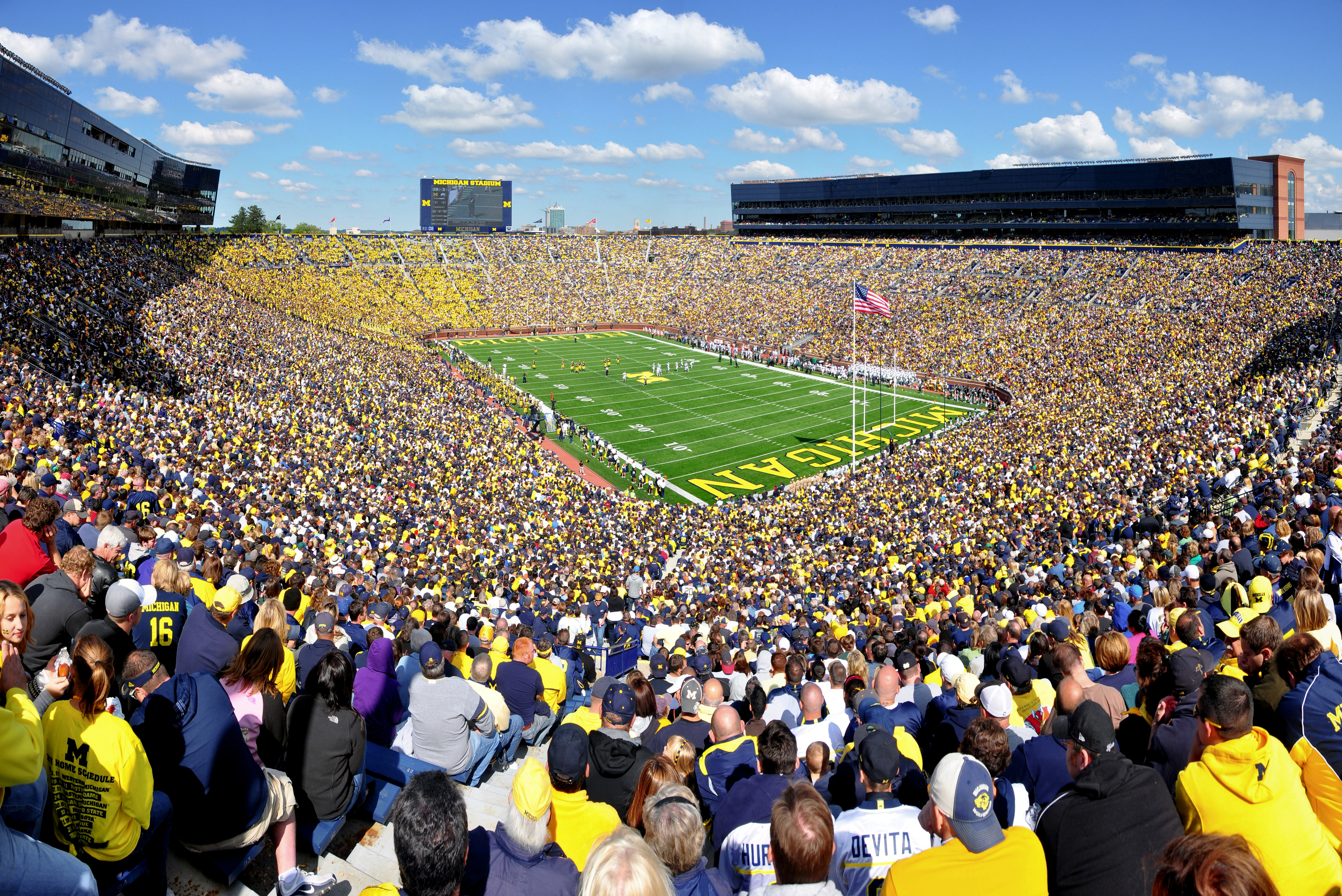
The game was held in prime time at Michigan Stadium (pictured)

Penn State entered the game coming off a bye week, which came after a loss to Northwestern; they were 4–1 (1–1 in conference play). Michigan entered the game with its program embroiled in controversy surrounding the underperforming team, a potential boycott planned among students, and calls for the removal of team personnel following a player health debacle in which quarterback Shane Morris remained in the game despite signs of a concussion. The previous season, the teams' matchup ended after four overtimes, with Penn State emerging victorious 43–40. On the field, Michigan was without their top rusher Derrick Green, whom they lost for the season due to a broken clavicle, but was expected to utilize De'Veon Smith, described as "more than capable" of handling that facet of their offense. Devin Gardner was the team's quarterback; it was key for Penn State to prevent him from being a dual-threat quarterback, needing to confine him solely to throwing the ball. Devin Funchess and Jake Butt were Michigan's top receivers. Michigan's defense featured a solid front seven, (Note: A defense's "front seven" consists of its defensive linemen and linebackers) and sought to pressure Christian Hackenberg for Penn State, whose running game continued to falter. Analysts from a variety of backgrounds expected a relatively low scoring game; four of six ESPN panelists predicted that Penn State would win, while the four panelists from the Big Ten Network were split as to who would win. Most expected a close game.

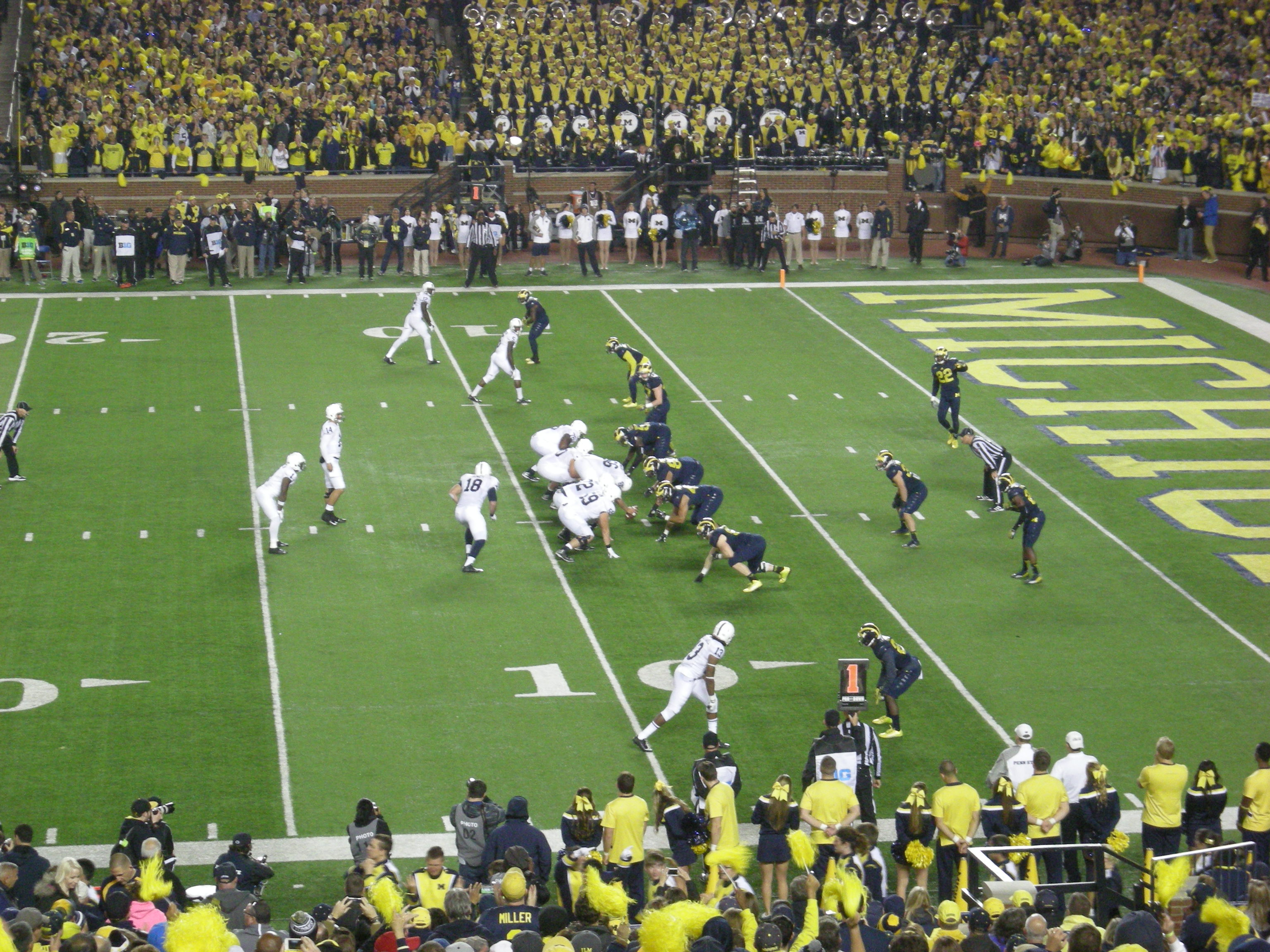
Penn State on offense during the game against Michigan

Opening the game with the ball, Penn State's first drive achieved several first downs, but stalled in the red zone; Sam Ficken made a 35-yard field goal to give Penn State an early lead. Michigan moved the ball down the field on their next drive, and shortly after entering Penn State territory, Devin Gardner threw a pass downfield which went through the hands of Penn State's Ryan Keiser, and into the arms of Devin Funchess for a touchdown. In the waning minutes of the first quarter, Penn State drove down the field, and was faced with fourth down and two around Michigan's 20 yard line. Initially, Penn State lined up to go for it against the wishes of coach James Franklin due to a staff miscommunication, forcing Penn State to call their second timeout of the half. Ultimately, Ficken pulled Penn State within one point by kicking a 32-yard field goal. At the end of the first quarter, Michigan led 7–6. Early in the second quarter, Gardner tried to set up a screen pass, but the pass was intercepted by Anthony Zettel, and Penn State promptly capitalized with a 10-yard pass from Hackenberg to DaeSean Hamilton. Thereafter, Michigan drove down the field on an extended drive, and settled for a 45-yard field goal to move within three points. The first punt of the game occurred on the subsequent drive, when Penn State achieved only one first down, and Gulla punted. Michigan punted on their next drive as well, giving the ball back to Penn State at the end of the first half. Penn State did not score, and Penn State led 13–10 at halftime. The teams exchanged punts to start the second half. Michigan moved the ball into Penn State territory on their next drive, but when faced with a fourth down and three, their pass was incomplete, and they turned the ball over on downs. Penn State's next drive stalled around Michigan's 40 yard line; instead of attempting a field goal or punting, Penn State faked a punt, and lost yardage on the play, thus giving the ball back to Michigan with good field position. Michigan failed to capitalize, and punted; during their series, quarterback Devin Gardner left the game with an apparent injury, and was helped off the field. Penn State took over from the five yard line. Hackenberg threw an interception when Michigan blitzed on Penn State's ensuing drive, and Michigan was set up inside Penn State's 30 yard line. Michigan took the field with Russell Bellomy at quarterback, taking his first collegiate snaps. Perhaps consequently, they were forced to settle for a field goal attempt, which they made to tie the game at 13. Penn State's next drive failed to achieve any positive yardage, and after a 26-yard punt, Michigan took the field again with Bellomy at quarterback, already in Penn State territory. Unwilling to throw the football, Penn State's defense held Michigan's rushing attack in check, and they once again punted. At the end of the third quarter, the score was tied at 13. Penn State's offense was just as stagnant, and they punted once again. Gardner returned to the game on the next drive for Michigan. Concurrently, Michigan moved into field goal range via the passing game, and Wile made a 37-yard field goal to take the lead 16–13. On Penn State's ensuing drive, they were forced to punt after having their drive stall near midfield. Michigan sought to burn the clock on their subsequent drive, and did run it down to 3:57 remaining before an incomplete pass on third down forced a punt. Penn State took over at the eight yard line with 3:44 remaining in regulation. An intentional grounding penalty decimated the drive, forcing a third down and 19 from which Hackenberg was sacked at the one yard line. Subsequently, they had to burn their second timeout because they could not get lined up to punt the football. Penn State intentionally snapped the ball out of the end zone for a safety to give Michigan an 18–13 lead. Forced to attempt an onside kick in desperation, which they ostensibly recovered at the 33 yard line with 1:41 remaining. However, an offsides penalty was called against Penn State, forcing them to rekick. On their second chance, they were not as fortunate, and Michigan recovered, essentially ending the game, with Michigan winning 18–13.

It was a frustrating loss for Penn State, especially for quarterback Christian Hackenberg, who was constantly under pressure due to poor blocking. For his part, coach James Franklin bemoaned the fact that it is "hard to call a game when you can't consistently run block and you can't consistently protect the quarterback." Conspicuously, Geno Lewis, one of Penn State's top receivers entering the game, rarely played, an anomaly for which Franklin had little explanation. Penn State's defense was hamstrung by horrendous field position, which put them in difficult situations all night. The win for Michigan avenged their preceding month of turmoil with a strong performance from their defense, which held Penn State's offense in check.

=== No. 13 Ohio State ===
No. 13 Ohio State Buckeyes at Penn State Nittany Lions – Game summary

Quarter	1	2	3	4	OT	2OT	Total
No. 13 Buckeyes	7	10	0	0	7	7	31
Nittany Lions	0	0	7	10	7	0	24

at Beaver Stadium, University Park, Pennsylvania

- Date: October 25
- Game time: 8:00 p.m. EDT
- Game weather: Clear, 59 °F (15 °C)
- Game attendance: 107,895
- Referee: John O'Neill
- TV announcers (ABC): Brad Nessler (play-by-play), Todd Blackledge (analyst), Holly Rowe (sideline)
- ESPN Box Score

Game information

First quarter

- OSU – Ezekiel Elliott, 10 yard run, Sean Nuernberger XP good, 10:15 (OSU 7–0)

Second quarter

- OSU – Nuernberger, 49 yard field goal, 11:07 (OSU 10–0)
- OSU – Jeff Heuerman, 1 yard touchdown pass from J. T. Barrett, Nuernberger XP good, 3:58 (OSU 17–0)

Third quarter

- PSU – Anthony Zettel 40-yard interception return, Sam Ficken XP good, 13:37 (OSU 17–7)

Fourth quarter

- PSU – Saeed Blacknall, 24 yard touchdown pass from Christian Hackenberg, Ficken XP good, 11:08 (OSU 17–14)
- PSU – Ficken, 31 yard field goal, 0:09 (TIE 17–17)

First overtime

- PSU – Bill Belton, 1 yard run, Ficken XP good (PSU 24–17)
- OSU – Barrett, 5 yard run, Nuernberger XP good (TIE 24–24)

Second overtime

- OSU – Barrett, 4 yard run, Nuernberger XP good (OSU 31–24)

Top passer

- OSU – J. T. Barrett – 12/19, 74 yards, TD, 2 INT
- PSU – Christian Hackenberg – 31/49, 224 yards, TD, 2 INT

Top rusher

- OSU – Ezekiel Elliott – 26 rushes, 109 yards, TD
- PSU – Akeel Lynch – 13 rushes, 38 yards

Top receiver

- OSU – Jeff Heuerman – 3 receptions, 19 yards, TD
- PSU – DaeSean Hamilton – 14 receptions, 126 yards

Entering the game on a two-game losing streak, Penn State was expected to lose to Ohio State, the latter of whom was unanimously selected by panelists from both ESPN.com and the Big Ten Network, and boasted a 5–1 record and a number 13 ranking nationally entering the game. Led by surging quarterback J. T. Barrett, Ohio State's offense sought to utilize a multifaceted attack against Penn State's "stingy" defense. In order to succeed without a particularly strong offense, Jared Slanina of Black Shoe Diaries wrote, "The Penn State defense will be the best the Buckeyes have faced thus far in 2014. They will need to not only shut down the run, something they do better than anyone in the nation, but also apply enough pressure to Barrett to force him into making bad decisions to force a few turnovers." The defense was without senior safety Ryan Keiser, who was hurt the week prior in practice. Penn State's offensive line figured to have a difficult time defending against Ohio State's "fearsome foursome" on the defensive line, which "should have no problem penetrating Penn State's offensive line, shutting down the run game and harassing Hackenberg into a few bad plays." Overall, the game was not expected to be particularly close.

In a game many college football observers thought was marred by controversial officiating with two blatant missed calls leading to the issuance of a statement from the Big Ten that nevertheless many reporters deemed unsatisfactory, Penn State managed to take Ohio State into two overtimes despite many anticipating a blowout, and prompted Franklin to comment, "There are no moral victories at Penn State, and there never will be, but I'm proud of how the way they fought." In the first overtime, Penn state lead 24-17 and looked poised to pull off a major upset over Ohio State, but the Buckeyes scored to tie the game and then won it in the second overtime. Penn State's defense received accolade for its play. Aside from captain and leader Mike Hull's continued strong play (he made 19 tackles, a career-high), "a charged and freed-up Deion Barnes" compiled seven tackles and 1.5 tackles for a loss, a "savagely effective Austin Johnson" totaled four tackles, and up and coming linebacker Brandon Bell posted 13 tackles. The week after the game, Penn State learned it would be without Zach Zwinak, whom it lost early in the game and was carted off the field, and Keiser, hurt earlier in practice, would miss the remainder of the season, thus ending their Penn State careers, as they were both seniors.

=== Maryland ===
Maryland Terrapins at Penn State Nittany Lions – Game summary

Quarter	1	2	3	4	Total
Terrapins	0	7	0	13	20
Nittany Lions	3	6	7	3	19

at Beaver Stadium, University Park, Pennsylvania

- Date: November 1
- Game time: 12:00 p.m. EDT
- Game weather: Mostly cloudy, 42 °F (6 °C)
- Game attendance: 103,969
- Referee: Jerry McGinn
- TV announcers (ESPN2): Beth Mowins (play-by-play), Joey Galloway (analyst), Paul Carcaterra (sideline)
- ESPN Box Score

Game information

First quarter

- PSU – Sam Ficken, 47 yard field goal, 10:56 (PSU 3–0)

Second quarter

- MD – P.J. Gallo, 2 yard pass from C.J. Brown, Brad Craddock XP good, 13:52 (MD 7–3)
- PSU – Ficken, 25 yard field goal, 5:06 (MD 7–6)
- PSU – Ficken, 46 yard field goal, 1:30 (PSU 9–7)

Third quarter

- PSU – Jesse James, 8 yard pass from Christian Hackenberg, Ficken XP good, 3:18 (PSU 16–7)

Fourth quarter

- MD – Craddock, 25 yard field goal, 13:11 (PSU 16–10)
- MD – Wes Brown, 1 yard run, Craddock XP good, 11:30 (MD 17–16)
- PSU – Ficken, 48 yard field goal, 6:52 (PSU 19–17)
- MD – Craddock, 43 yard field goal, 0:51 (MD 20–19)

Top passer

- MD – C. J. Brown – 18/38, 161 yards, TD
- PSU – Christian Hackenberg – 18/42, 177 yards, TD, INT

Top rusher

- MD – Wes Brown – 10 rushes, 24 yards, TD
- PSU – Akeel Lynch – 21 rushes, 51 yards

Top receiver

- MD – Stefon Diggs – 6 receptions, 53 yards
- PSU – Geno Lewis – 5 receptions, 54 yards

Penn State entered the game on a three-game losing streak, looking to snap it at home against Maryland, who was 5–3. Offensively, Penn State looked to build on the modest improvement from its offensive line against Ohio State. Notwithstanding the fact that it was missing two veterans due to injury – Donovan Smith and Miles Dieffenbach – and the status of center Wendy Laurent was in question due to his role in an egg-throwing incident before the game (ultimately he played), Penn State was "optimistic" regarding the group's amelioration. Defensively, Penn State was led by Mike Hull, an inexplicable "snub" from the semifinalist list for the Butkus Award coming off a 19-tackle performance against Ohio State. Penn State needed to control Stefon Diggs, Maryland's top offensive weapon. The game was important for both teams, according to one Penn State writer: "This feels like a swing game in the context of both teams' seasons. In each case, with a win, seven or eight wins are on the table. With a loss, perhaps, seven or eight losses are." Despite a potentially "anemic" offense, Penn State was largely expected to win in a close game according to writers from SBNation.com, the Big Ten Network, and ESPN's Big Ten Blog.

Penn State received the opening kickoff and started with good field position thanks to a pre-game unsportsmanlike conduct penalty called against Maryland. Penn State's offense, with Akeel Lynch making his first start at running back, moved down the field, but ultimately settled for Sam Ficken kicking a 47-yard field goal, his longest of the season. Maryland took the ball, and was aided by dead ball personal foul and unsportsmanlike conduct penalties that moved them down the field 30 yards, but they still were forced to punt. After a Penn State interception, Maryland failed to capitalize, and punted. The offenses' ineffectiveness continued, as Penn State's drive was decimated by a sack. Maryland had excellent field position after Penn State's punting troubles continued; Daniel Pasquariello managed only 23 yards on the punt. At the end of the first quarter, Penn State led 3–0. In the second quarter, Maryland moved into the red zone thanks to the second 15-yard penalty of the game called against Marcus Allen, and then scored a touchdown on a short pass from C.J. Brown to P.J. Gallo, giving Maryland a 7–3 advantage. Thereafter, the teams exchanged punts. On Penn State's ensuing drive, an interception returned for a touchdown was nullified by a roughing the passer penalty, and a pass interference penalty gave Penn State an automatic first down. Nevertheless, Penn State failed to score a touchdown, settling for a 25-yard field goal attempt from Ficken, which moved Penn State to within one. Maryland punted on their next drive, giving Penn State the ball in Maryland's territory to start their drive. Despite the field position, Penn State could not move the ball down the field; Ficken attempted a 46-yard field goal, which he made to give Penn State a two-point advantage with 1:30 to play in the half. Looking to score before the half, Maryland instead fumbled the ball, relinquishing it to the Nittany Lions at Maryland's 32 yard line with 1:21 remaining. Penn State turned the ball over right back, however. Hackenberg simply had the ball slip out of his hand while passing. Maryland went three-and-out off the turnover, and punted back to Penn State. After another sack, Penn State took a knee, and entered halftime ahead by two points, but struggling offensively. Maryland received the kickoff to begin the second half, and went three-and-out. Penn State's offense was no more effective, going three-and-out as well. The offenses' respective anemia continued, as they exchanged punts twice. Subsequently, Maryland turned the ball over via a fumble, recovered near midfield by C.J. Olaniyan. Finally, Penn State's offense gained some momentum offensively, achieving three consecutive first downs via the passing game. On a third down in the red zone, Hackenberg threw a jump ball in the corner of the end zone to Jesse James, giving Penn State a 16–7 lead. Maryland quickly punted, giving Penn State an opportunity to pad their lead. Instead, they went three-and-out. Maryland was threatening in the Penn State's red zone at the end of the third quarter. They failed to score a touchdown, though, settling for a field goal from Brad Craddock to pull within six points. On the ensuing kickoff, Grant Haley fumbled the return, and Maryland was given an opportunity to take the lead with great field position. On their first play from scrimmage, they lost 10 yards via a sack, but on the next play, moved inside the 10 yard line. This time, they scored a touchdown, and took a 1-point lead. Penn State failed to respond, and punted back to the Terrapins, still with more than 10 minutes remaining in the quarter. Maryland punted, and on the punt, was called for a kick-catch interference penalty, giving Penn State the ball at their own 36 yard line. Despite an early false start penalty, a fumble that they did manage to recover, and a sack, Penn State converted a 3rd down and 23 play with a long pass to Geno Lewis, but stalled thereafter. Ficken tried a 48-yard field goal, which he made, his fourth of the day, and his new longest of the season. Penn State led 19–17 with 6:52 remaining. After Maryland punted, Penn State sought to run out the clock after taking possession with just over three minutes remaining. Instead, Penn State's running game faltered, and they went three-and-out; Pasquariello came on to punt, and Maryland took over just outside Penn State's 40 yard line, almost already within Craddock's range (he had made 19 consecutive field goal attempts, including a 57-yard attempt earlier in the season). Maryland moved down field well into field goal range. With 56 seconds remaining, Craddock came onto attempt a 43-yard field goal, which he made, giving Maryland a 20–19 lead with 51 seconds left. Hackenberg led his team onto the field with 46 seconds remaining at their own 19 yard line with two timeouts, seeking to move at least into field goal range for Ficken. Penn State failed to achieve a first down, and Maryland iced the victory.

=== At Indiana ===
Penn State Nittany Lions at Indiana Hoosiers – Game summary

Quarter	1	2	3	4	Total
Nittany Lions	0	7	3	3	13
Hoosiers	0	7	0	0	7

at Memorial Stadium, Bloomington, Indiana

- Date: November 8
- Game time: 12:00 p.m. EDT
- Game weather: Partly sunny, 49 °F (9 °C)
- Game attendance: 42,683
- Referee: David Witvoet
- TV announcers (BTN): Eric Collins (play-by-play), Chuck Long (analyst), Lisa Boyington (sideline)
- ESPN Box Score

Game information

First quarter

- No scoring

Second quarter

- IND – Mark Murphy, 53 yard interception return, Griffin Oakes, XP good, 3:57 (IND 7–0)
- PSU – Bill Belton, 92 yard run, Sam Ficken XP good, 3:37 (TIE 7–7)

Third quarter

- PSU – Ficken, 27 yard field goal, 9:28 (PSU 10–7)

Fourth quarter

- PSU – Ficken, 28 yard field goal, 0:55 (PSU 13–7)

Top passer

- PSU – Christian Hackenberg – 12/29, 168 yards, 2 INT
- IND – Zander Diamont – 13/27, 68 yards, 2 INT

Top rusher

- PSU – Bill Belton – 16 rushes, 137 yards, TD
- IND – Tevin Coleman – 20 rushes, 71 yards

Top receiver

- PSU – Geno Lewis – 4 receptions, 39 yards
- IND – Dominique Booth – 4 receptions, 33 yards

Penn State received the opening kickoff, and went three-and-out, punting the ball, the first of seven consecutive drives ending in punts in the first quarter (both teams combined). The game remained scoreless as the second quarter began. Indiana began the second quarter with a drive that culminated with a punt, but on their ensuing drive, Penn State managed to drive into the red zone, and despite a first down and goal inside the five yard line, failed to score, executing three consecutive running plays for no gain, and then having a 23-yard field goal attempt from Sam Ficken blocked. After Indiana punted once again, Christian Hackenberg threw a screen pass that was intercepted and returned for a touchdown by Mark Murphy, giving Indiana a 7–0 lead. Penn State quickly responded; Bill Belton rushed for a 92-yard touchdown, the longest touchdown run in Penn State history. The teams subsequently exchanged punts, and at halftime, the score was tied at seven. Indiana's opening drive of the second half did not come to fruition, and Penn State achieved a few first downs before settling for a field goal, giving them a three-point advantage. Anemic offensive play continued for both teams, as they exchanged punts once again. At the end of the third quarter, Penn State led 10–7 and had the ball in their own territory. Early in the quarter, Griffin Oakes missed a 51-yard field goal. After moving down field with a long pass to Jesse James, two consecutive sacks decimated the drive, moving Penn State out of field goal range, and forcing them to punt. On Penn State's next drive, Hackenberg threw an interception, giving Indiana solid field position near midfield, but Indiana lost yardage on the drive, and went three-and-out. Penn State went three-and-out, and punted, and gave the ball back to Indiana with 2:55 remaining at their own 22 yard line. On Indiana's first play, Nyeem Wartman recorded an interception for Penn State. Penn State ran down the clock, and Ficken kicked a field goal to give the Lions a six-point advantage. Indiana's last drive was ineffectual, and the Lions held on to win 13–7.

=== Temple ===
Temple Owls at Penn State Nittany Lions – Game summary

Quarter	1	2	3	4	Total
Owls	3	0	10	0	13
Nittany Lions	3	3	14	10	30

at Beaver Stadium, University Park, Pennsylvania

- Date: November 15
- Game time: 12:00 p.m. EST
- Game weather: 38 °F (3 °C)
- Game attendance: 100,173
- Referee: Todd LaPenta
- TV announcers (ESPN2): Beth Mowins (play-by-play), Joey Galloway (analyst), Paul Carcaterra (sideline)
- ESPN Box Score

Game information

First quarter

- PSU – Sam Ficken 29-yard field goal, 8:01. Nittany Lions 3–0. Drive: 12 plays, 64 yards, 6:59.
- TEM – Austin Jones 31-yard field goal, 3:13. Tied 3–3. Drive: 7 plays, 33 yards, 2:21.

Second quarter

- PSU – Sam Ficken 50-yard field goal, 0:00. Nittany Lions 6–3. Drive: 9 plays, 55 yards, 0:53.

Third quarter

- TEM – Austin Jones 25-yard field goal, 6:52. Tied 6–6. Drive: 4 plays, 8 yards, 2:06.
- PSU – Akeel Lynch 38-yard run (Sam Fickenkick), 6:13. Nittany Lions 13–6. Drive: 2 plays, 75 yards, 0:39.
- PSU – Bill Belton 8-yard run (Sam Ficken kick), 5:19. Nittany Lions 20–6. Drive: 1 play, 8 yards, 0:03.
- TEM – Jalen Fitzpatrick 75-yard pass from P. J. Walker (Austin Jones kick), 5:08. Nittany Lions 20–13. Drive: 1 play, 75 yards, 0:11.

Fourth quarter

- PSU – Grant Haley 30-yard interception return (Sam Ficken kick), 13:57. Nittany Lions 27–13.
- PSU – Sam Ficken 21-yard field goal, 10:36. Nittany Lions 30–13. Drive: 6 plays, 20 yards, 2:26.

Top passer

- TEM – P. J. Walker – 17/38, 187 yards, TD, 4 INT
- PSU – Christian Hackenberg – 12/26, 112 yards, 2 INT

Top rusher

- TEM – P. J. Walker – 5 rushes, 32 yards
- PSU – Akeel Lynch – 18 rushes, 130 yards, TD

Top receiver

- TEM – Jalen Fitzpatrick – 4 receptions, 113 yards, TD
- PSU – Chris Godwin – 2 receptions, 31 yards

Seeking to defeat Penn State for the first time since 1941, Temple visited Beaver Stadium looking to win their sixth game to become bowl eligible. Penn State too sought to win their sixth game to become eligible for postseason play for the first time in several years since implementation of sanctions. Although Penn State was unanimously selected to win by writers from ESPN's Big Ten Blog and the Big Ten Network, almost all commentators predicted a close, defensive battle.

Penn State received the opening kickoff, and drove into the red zone, but a holding penalty nullified a touchdown, so the Lions settled for a 29-yard field goal from Sam Ficken. After Temple went three-and-out, Bill Belton fumbled the ball, giving it back to Temple, who ultimately kicked a 31-yard field goal. When Penn State regained possession of the ball, they moved down the field with help from several offsides penalties against Temple, and at the end of the first quarter, they faced a fourth down and short situation near Temple's 40 yard line. Although they converted, they eventually punted the ball away. When Temple went three-and-out again, Penn State had the opportunity to essentially pick up where they left off offensively around the 45 yard line. However, Temple intercepted a pass, and returned it 25 yards to move into Penn State territory. Subsequently, the teams exchanged punts. In the waning moments of the first half, aided by an unsportsmanlike conduct penalty, Penn State moved into the periphery of field goal range, and Ficken attempted a 50-yard field goal, which he made as time expired in the first half to give Penn State a 6–3 lead. Temple's opening drive of the second half stalled when they missed a 42-yard field goal. Penn State achieved some momentum as they moved down the field, converting on a third down and long, but when faced with pressure, Hackenberg threw an interception that gave Temple the ball at the Penn State 16 yard line after a personal foul against Penn State was assessed. Penn State's defense forced Temple to settle for a field goal, though, which tied the game at six. The running game finally manifested itself on Penn State's ensuing drive; Belton rushed for a 37-yard gain on the drive's first play from scrimmage, and Akeel Lynch rushed for a 38-yard touchdown on the next play, giving Penn State a 13–6 lead. P.J. Walker dropped back to pass on Temple's first play of the ensuing drive, and he threw an interception to Adrian Amos, who returned the ball inside the 10 yard line. Belton rushed for an eight-yard touchdown on the first play of the Penn State's possession. Temple quickly responded when Walker threw a 75-yard pass to Jalen Fitzpatrick, making the score 20–13. Penn State punted on their next drive, but Christian Campbell intercepted a pass on Temple's next drive, and Penn State once again had possession. Ultimately, the Lions punted on the first play of the fourth quarter, giving Temple possession at their own 10 yard line at the beginning of the quarter. Penn State created another turnover; freshman cornerback Grant Haley intercepted a pass from Walker, and returned it for a touchdown to give Penn State a 27–13 lead. On Temple's next drive, Walker lost a fumble, which was recovered by Austin Johnson for Temple's fourth turnover of the game. Ficken made a 21-yard field goal on the ensuing drive, making it a three-possession game. Temple's second-half offensive woes continued on its next drive, when it committed its fifth turnover when Jesse Della Valle made an acrobatic interception. Penn State failed to capitalize, as Ficken's 42-yard field goal attempt was blocked. Temple subsequently turned the ball over on downs, and Penn State's second-string offense ran the clock out as the Nittany Lions achieved the victory, becoming bowl eligible.

=== At Illinois ===
Penn State Nittany Lions at Illinois Fighting Illini – Game summary

Quarter	1	2	3	4	Total
Nittany Lions	7	0	0	7	14
Fighting Illini	0	7	3	6	16

at Memorial Stadium, Champaign, Illinois

- Date: November 22
- Game time: 12:00 p.m. EST / 11:00 a.m. CST
- Game weather: Scattered clouds, 50 °F (10 °C)
- Game attendance: 35,172
- Referee: Todd Geerlings
- TV announcers (ESPN2): Bob Wischusen (play-by-play), Matt Millen (analyst), Quint Kessenich (sideline)
- ESPN Box Score

Game information

First quarter

- PSU – Chris Godwin 18-yard pass from Christian Hackenberg (Sam Ficken kick), 8:24. Nittany Lions 7–0. Drive: 9 plays, 52 yards, 4:49.

Second quarter

- ILL – Matt LaCosse 1-yard pass from Reilly O'Toole (David Reisner kick), 0:25. Tied 7–7. Drive: 12 plays, 68 yards, 2:27.

Third quarter

- ILL – David Reisner 28-yard field goal, 12:26. Fighting Illini 10–7. Drive: 6 plays, 19 yards, 2:34.

Fourth quarter

- PSU – Akeel Lynch 47-yard run (Sam Ficken kick), 13:37. Nittany Lions 14–10. Drive: 8 plays, 77 yards, 4:14.
- ILL – David Reisner 25-yard field goal, 8:43. Nittany Lions 14–13. Drive: 11 plays, 58 yards, 4:54.
- ILL – David Reisner 36-yard field goal, 0:08. Fighting Illini 16–14. Drive: 7 plays, 54 yards, 1:40.

Top passer

- PSU – Christian Hackenberg – 8/16, 93 yards, TD, INT
- ILL – Reilly O'Toole – 18/25, 157 yards, TD

Top rusher

- PSU – Akeel Lynch – 28 rushes, 137 yards, TD
- ILL – Donovonn Young – 14 rushes, 62 yards

Top receiver

- PSU – Akeel Lynch – 2 receptions, 23 yards
- ILL – Mike Dudek – 11 receptions, 115 yards

Illinois received the opening kickoff, but quickly relinquished the ball after their driving stalling largely because of a sack by Anthony Zettel. Penn State, with great field position thanks to a short punt due to wind, moved into the red zone, and on a third down play, Christian Hackenberg threw an 18-yard touchdown pass to Chris Godwin. Illinois went three-and-out on its next drive, and Penn State again moved into the red zone thanks to a 32-yard run by defensive lineman Brad Bars on a fake punt, but was forced to settle for a field goal attempt; Chris Gulla, the holder, bobbled the snap, and Sam Ficken was unable to kick the ball, so Penn State had to turn the ball over on downs. Subsequently, the teams exchanged punts, and at the end of the first quarter, Penn State led 7–0. After three more punts, Penn State's drive ended when Akeel Lynch lost a fumble. In the waning moments of the first half, after being helped by a Penn State offsides penalty on fourth down, Illinois drove down the field, and scored a touchdown via a 1-yard pass from Reilly O'Toole to Matt LaCosse. The score was tied at seven at halftime. The first kickoff of the second half went high into the wind, and was effectively an onside kick, insofar as Illinois recovered the kick and thus gained possession. They made a field goal thereafter to take a three-point lead. At the end of the quarter, Penn State had the ball and was approaching midfield. In the first two minutes of the quarter, Lynch broke a 47-yard rush for a touchdown, giving Penn State a four-point lead. On Illinois' ensuing drive, they converted a fourth down, and attempted a 25-yard field goal to make it a one-point Penn State lead. Subsequently, Penn State punted, giving Illinois the ball with 6:15 remaining. Illinois moved down field into the periphery of field goal range, and Reisner missed a 50-yard field goal with just under 3:30 remaining. With 1:53 to play, Pasquariello punted the ball, and Illinois took possession at their own 27 yard line with 1:48 to play and two timeouts. After just two plays, Illinois was already down to Penn State's 30 yard line, and on the next play, they ran down to the 14 yard line. With 13 seconds, Reisner came onto the field to attempt a 36-yard field goal, which he eked inside the upright to take a 16–14 lead with eight seconds left. After a touchback, Penn State, without any timeouts, took over at their own 25 yard line; they did not score, and Illinois picked up their second conference win of the season.

=== No. 10 Michigan State ===
No. 10 Michigan State Spartans at Penn State Nittany Lions – Game summary

Quarter	1	2	3	4	Total
No. 10 Spartans	13	0	14	7	34
Nittany Lions	0	3	7	0	10

at Beaver Stadium, University Park, Pennsylvania

- Date: November 29
- Game time: 3:30 p.m. EST
- Game weather: Scattered clouds, 50 °F (10 °C)
- Game attendance: 99,902
- Referee: Dan Capron
- TV announcers (ABC/ESPN2): Mike Patrick (play-by-play), Ed Cunningham (analyst), Jeannine Edwards (sideline)
- ESPN Box Score

Game information

First quarter

- MSU – R.J. Shelton, 90 yard kickoff return for touchdown, Michael Geiger XP good, 14:46 (MSU 7–0)
- MSU – Geiger, 36 yard field goal, 8:41 (MSU 10–0)
- MSU – Geiger, 39 yard field goal, 0:13 (MSU 13–0)

Second quarter

- PSU – Sam Ficken, 41 yard field goal, 4:34 (MSU 13–3)

Third quarter

- MSU – Jeremy Langford, 3 yard run, Geiger XP good, 7:24 (MSU 20–3)
- MSU – Tony Lippett, 10 yard pass from Connor Cook, Geiger XP good, 4:29 (MSU 27–3)
- PSU – Akeel Lynch, 3 yard run, Ficken XP good, 1:37 (MSU 27–10)

Fourth quarter

- MSU – Langford, 6 yard run, Geiger XP good, 2:49 (MSU 34–10)

Top passer

- MSU – Connor Cook – 13/25, 180 yards, TD, INT
- PSU – Christian Hackenberg – 21/45, 195 yards, INT

Top rusher

- MSU – Jeremy Langford – 30 rushes, 118 yards, 2 TD
- PSU – Akeel Lynch – 14 rushes, 51 yards, TD

Top receiver

- MSU – Tony Lippett – 4 receptions, 53 yards, TD
- PSU – DaeSean Hamilton – 6 receptions, 55 yards

In the renewed battle for the Land Grant Trophy, the rivalry between the two schools continued for the first time since 2010, when the Big Ten's divisions aligned such that the teams did not play from 2011 until 2013. Michigan State was a 13.5 point favorite, largely due to their defense's supposed advantage against Penn State's inconsistent offense. It was senior recognition day for Penn State. Penn State's defense entered the game among the best in the country, ranking first in rush defense, third in total defense, and fourth in scoring defense, and featuring the dominant senior Mike Hull as Linebacker U. Meanwhile, Christian Hackenberg sought to rebound from struggles during the course of the season, which led some fans to call for him to be benched; James Franklin saw the game as an opportunity for the amelioration of the offensive line to culminate with a sound offensive performance, despite the Spartans' stout defense. Michigan State, ranked tenth in the country, was predicted to win by media covering both teams, as well as all six ESPN.com Big Ten bloggers, and all four of the Big Ten Network's panelists.

Michigan State received the opening kickoff, and R.J. Shelton returned it for a touchdown. On Penn State's ensuing drive, they moved down the field, but after an incomplete pass on third and 10 intended for Jesse James on which a potential pass interference penalty was not called, Sam Ficken missed a 51-yard field goal attempt. Michigan State marched down the field, but stalled in the red zone after three consecutive tipped incomplete passes, and settled for a 36-yard field goal. Penn State punted on their next drive after another non-call on a potential pass interference. Michigan State went up 13–0 on their next drive in the waning seconds of the first quarter. After a sack knocked Penn State out of field goal range, Daniel Pasquariello managed to pin a punt inside Michigan State's five yard line, and when the Spartans went three-and-out, Penn State got the ball with excellent field position near the MSU 40 yard line. They squandered it, and went three-and-out. Michigan State went three-and-out, and Penn State got similar field position. After Penn State failed to score a touchdown, Ficken came on to attempt a 41-yard field goal, which he made, his 23rd field goal of the season, a Penn State single-season record. Michigan State regained possession, and moved the ball to about midfield, when, on third and 20, C.J. Olaniyan hit Connor Cook from behind, and Anthony Zettel recorded an interception. Consequently, Penn State had the ball at the MSU 36 yard line with 45 seconds and three timeouts. Hackenberg threw a pass into the end zone, and Chris Godwin got a hand on it, but Trae Waynes stripped the ball away for the interception. At the half, MSU led 13–3. Penn State's opening second half drive stalled, and Michigan State responded by scoring a touchdown on a drive highlighted by two consecutive 25+ yard passes. Hackenberg fumbled on a sack deep in Penn State's territory, and Michigan State capitalized, taking a 27–3 lead on a pass from Cook to Tony Lippett. Subsequently, Penn State finally moved the ball down the field, and Akeel Lynch rushed for a three-yard touchdown. Michigan State's first drive of the fourth quarter ended with a missed field goal, potentially giving Penn State some momentum, but ultimately, the Lions went three-and-out, and the teams exchanged punts. Penn State's next two drives failed on fourth down attempts, and Michigan State scored in between those drives, eventually winning 34–10.

=== Vs. Boston College (Pinstripe Bowl) ===
2014 Pinstripe Bowl
Boston College Eagles vs. Penn State Nittany Lions – Game summary

Quarter	1	2	3	4	OT	Total
Eagles	7	0	14	3	6	30
Nittany Lions	7	0	7	10	7	31

at Yankee Stadium, Bronx, New York

- Date: December 27
- Game time: 4:30 p.m. EST
- Game attendance: 49,012
- Referee: Matt Loeffler
- TV announcers (ESPN): Bob Wischusen (play-by-play), Matt Millen (analyst), Quint Kessenich (sideline)
- ESPN Box Score

Game information

First quarter

- PSU – Chris Godwin, 72 yard pass from Christian Hackenberg, Sam Ficken XP good, 5:22 (PSU 7–0)
- BC – Jon Hillman, 49 yard run, Mike Knoll XP good, 4:39 (TIE 7–7)

Second quarter

- No scoring

Third quarter

- BC – Shakim Phillips, 19 yard pass from Tyler Murphy, Knoll XP good, 8:07 (BC 14–7)
- BC – Murphy, 40 yard run, Knoll XP good, 2:12 (BC 21–7)
- PSU – Geno Lewis, 7 yard pass from Hackenberg, Ficken XP good, 0:00 (BC 21–14)

Fourth quarter

- PSU – DaeSean Hamilton, 16 yard pass from Hackenberg, Ficken XP good, 6:48 (TIE 21–21)
- BC – Knoll, 20 yard field goal, 2:10 (BC 24–21)
- PSU – Ficken, 45 yard field goal, 0:20 (TIE 24–24)

Overtime

- BC – David Dudeck, 21 yard pass from Murphy, Knoll XP no good (BC 30–24)
- PSU – Kyle Carter, 10 yard pass from Hackenberg, Ficken XP good (PSU 31–30)

Top passer

- BC – Tyler Murphy – 11/19, 97 yards, 2 TD
- PSU – Christian Hackenberg – 34/50, 371 yards, 4 TD

Top rusher

- BC – Jonathan Hilliman – 25 rushes, 148 yards, TD
- PSU – Akeel Lynch – 17 rushes, 75 yards

Top receiver

- BC – Shakim Phillips – 3 receptions, 40 yards, TD
- PSU – Chris Godwin – 7 receptions, 140 yards, TD

On December 7, reports surfaced that Penn State's first bowl game since 2011 would be against Boston College in the 2014 Pinstripe Bowl.

Penn State won the coin toss, and elected to receive. Their opening drive reached the Boston College 40 yard line, but after a false start and an incomplete pass, they had to punt. After that, Boston College went three-and-out, and punted back to Penn State. Once again, Penn State approached field goal range on their next drive, but could not score, instead being forced to punt. Jon Hilliman rushed for 44 yards on the first play of Boston College's next possession. On fourth and five from the 30 yard line, Boston College failed to convert, turning the ball over on downs. Faced with a third down and 12 situation on their ensuing drive, Christian Hackenberg threw a long pass down the right sideline for a 72-yard touchdown to Chris Godwin. Penn State attempted an onside kick on the subsequent kickoff, and nearly recovered it, but their receiver was just out of bounds. Consequently, Boston College got excellent field position near midfield. On the second play of the drive, Hilliman rushed for a 49-yard touchdown to tie the game at seven. Penn State got the ball at their own 35 yard line after Boston College kicked off the ball out of bounds. In the waning moments of the first quarter, Penn State drove to just outside the red zone; at the conclusion of the quarter, they were at the Boston College 21 yard line.

On the first play of the second quarter, Hackenberg fumbled the snap, and Boston College recovered, preventing Penn State from scoring on the edge of the red zone. Boston College had success with the rushing game early on their subsequent drive, but eventually it stalled, and they punted. Penn State punted on their next drive as well. When an ineligible player down field penalty negated a pass play of over 30 yards for Boston College on their next drive, they were forced to punt. Defensive superiority continued on the next Penn State drive, when the Lions punted on fourth down and 18. An early personal foul penalty decimated Boston College's next drive, which went three-and-out. Penn State also went three-and-out, and punted back to the Eagles, who got good field position after a 24-yard return during which a potential illegal block in the back penalty against Boston College was not called much to the dismay of Penn State fans and coach James Franklin. That drive never reached fruition, and at the half, the score was tied at seven.

Boston College received the opening second half kickoff, and proceeded to move the ball down field right to the edge of the range of their kicker around the Penn State 25 yard line; on fourth down, they went for it and converted to move into the red zone. On third down and 12, Tyler Murphy found Shakim Phillips for a 20-yard touchdown pass to take a 14–7 lead. Penn State took the field and moved the ball inside the 30 yard line, but once again turned the ball over on a fumbled snap. The rushing attack took control for Boston College on their ensuing drive, and Murphy rushed for a 40-yard touchdown. Penn State's offense moved down the field with a 32-yard pass from Hackenberg to Lewis plus a facemask penalty that moved them inside Boston College's 15 yard line. On the final play of the third quarter, Hackenberg threw a 7-yard slant pass that Lewis initially bobbled, but eventually corralled for a touchdown, pulling the Lions within seven points.

Boston College lost yardage on their first drive of the fourth quarter, going three-and-out after a holding penalty put them in a long yardage situation. After the teams exchanged punts, Penn State took possession with solid field position at their own 45 yard line. Akeel Lynch rushed 35 yards inside the one yard line; an instant replay held that he did not reach the end zone, and on the next play, a 15-yard penalty moved Penn State back to face a second and goal at the 16 yard line. However, on the next play, Hackenberg threw a 16-yard touchdown pass down the seam to DaeSean Hamilton, tying the game. Another replay review occurred on Boston College's next drive; replay held that Shakim Phillips did not complete the process of the catch on a long pass down the right sideline, and thus the play was ruled incomplete. Nevertheless, Boston College converted the subsequent third down, and their drive continued. They moved to the Penn State 30 yard line with under five minutes remaining. Hilliman rushed the ball outside for Boston College, and Adrian Amos was flagged for a personal foul late hit, moving the Eagles to the 10 yard line. Penn State spent two timeouts to conserve clock as Boston College ran the ball to try to score with about three minutes remaining. On third down and eight, Murphy rushed to the three yard line, where Mike Knoll lined up to kick a short field goal from the right hash mark. With 2:10 remaining, Knoll made a 20-yard field goal to take a 24–21 lead. With 2:05 remaining, Penn State took the field with one timeout at their own 24 yard line. Penn State methodically moved down field thanks to a 25-yard pass to Godwin. Faced with fourth down and two, Ficken attempted a 45-yard field goal, which he made to tie the game with 20 seconds remaining. With 12 seconds left, Boston College took a knee to send the game into overtime.

Penn State won the overtime coin toss and elected to play defense, an advantage in college football overtime rules. Starting at Penn State's 25 yard line, Boston College took the field hoping to avoid having to kick a field goal, which was an "adventure" all season. They scored a touchdown on a 20-yard pass from Murphy to David Dudeck, but the extra point was no good. Penn State's drive opened with a false start, and two plays later, they faced third down and 15, which they converted via a pass to tight end Jesse James. Shortly thereafter, Hackenberg found Kyle Carter in the corner of the end zone for a touchdown. Ficken made the extra point, and Penn State won 31–30.
