= Tom Hull (American football) =

American football player (born 1952)

No. 54,55
- Position: Linebacker

Personal information
- Born: June 30, 1952 (age 74); Cumberland, Maryland, U.S.
- Listed height: 6 ft 3 in (1.91 m)
- Listed weight: 229 lb (104 kg)

Career information
- High school: Uniontown (Uniontown, Pennsylvania)
- College: Penn State
- NFL draft: 1974: 12th round, 294th overall pick

Career history
- San Francisco 49ers (1974); Green Bay Packers (1975)
- Stats at Pro Football Reference

Thomas Michael Hull (born June 30, 1952) is an American former professional football linebacker in the National Football League (NFL). He was selected in the twelfth round of the 1974 NFL draft by the San Francisco 49ers and played that season with the team. The following season, he played with the Green Bay Packers. Prior to playing in the NFL, Hull played at the collegiate level at Penn State University.

Hull's son, Mike, followed in his father's footsteps and committed to Penn State in 2008. He later signed with the Miami Dolphins in 2015.
