= Akeel Lynch =

American football player (born 1994)

No. 22
- Position: Running back

Personal information
- Born: May 14, 1994 (age 32); Toronto, Ontario
- Listed height: 6 ft 0 in (1.83 m)
- Listed weight: 215 lb (98 kg)

Career information
- High school: Athol Springs (NY) St. Francis
- College: Nevada
- NFL draft: 2017: undrafted

Awards and highlights
- New York Gatorade Player of the Year (2011); Big Ten All-Academic Team (2013)

Akeel Joh-Vonnie Lynch (born May 14, 1994) is a retired American football running back who last played for the Nevada Wolf Pack football team. He grew up in Toronto, Ontario, Canada with divorced parents, but at age seven, his father was murdered. Later, he moved to New York, where he played high school football and eventually accepted a scholarship offer to play football at Penn State. After redshirting his freshman year, he emerged as a reserve player the next season, and by his sophomore year of eligibility, he had emerged as Penn State's top running back.

== Early life ==
Lynch grew up in Toronto, where, early in his life, his divorced Jamaican parents – Dona McKoy and Howard Lynch – shared joint custody of him. However, when Akeel Lynch was seven years old, Howard was murdered, which sent Akeel into mental health problems. In Toronto, Lynch attended St. Michael's College School, but when he realized he had the talent to play college football, he also realized the necessity of playing in America, and at age 16, he moved to Athol Springs, New York to attend St. Francis High School. Cognizant of his family's uncertain financial situation and that he might not be able to attend college without a scholarship, he understood the necessity in working hard to learn American football, and its juxtaposition to Canadian football. Eventually, he became "comfortable with his surroundings", and began to flourish in high school football, winning the New York Gatorade Player of the Year award. He received several scholarship offers, and settled on playing at Penn State after they hired Bill O'Brien.

== College career ==
=== Penn State ===
Turning down offers from Boston College and Iowa, Lynch accepted a scholarship offer to attend Penn State under the newly installed Bill O'Brien regime, which succeeded the Joe Paterno era after the Jerry Sandusky child sex abuse scandal. He redshirted his first season, and participated on the scout team while bulking up from 205 to 215 pounds (98 kg). The next season, "he was stellar in spring practice, showing size, speed and scoring ability in the team's spring Blue-White game." Consequently, he earned some playing time early in the season, and in Penn State's game against Eastern Michigan, he rushed for 108 yards, while the next week against Kent State, he compiled 123 rushing yards. Overall, Lynch rushed for 358 yards on 60 carries with one touchdown during his redshirt freshman season.

Similar to his freshman season, Lynch opened his sophomore year in 2014 stuck behind Bill Belton and Zach Zwinak on Penn State's depth chart at running back. With four new offensive linemen and a general lack of offensive continuity due in part to a new coordinator, Penn State's rushing attack struggled for much of the 2014 season. However, Lynch found success taking direct snaps in the wildcat formation, and ultimately emerged as the team's best running back, but still did not start for most of the season. Patiently awaiting "his time to shine", he contributed on special teams, but by the 2014 Pinstripe Bowl, he had emerged as the team's "top" running back, as evidenced by back-to-back games in which he rushed for at least 130 yards against Temple and Illinois towards the end of the season.

=== Nevada ===
Lynch received his degree from Penn State, and elected to play his 5th year for eligibility with the Nevada Wolf Pack football team as a graduate transfer.

On October 17, 2016 Lynch announced his retirement from football after having suffered multiple concussions; at the time of his announcement, Lynch was a top prospect for the 2017 CFL draft.
