= Mike Hull (linebacker) =

American football player (born 1991)

No. 45
- Position: Middle linebacker

Personal information
- Born: May 25, 1991 (age 35); Canonsburg, Pennsylvania, U.S.
- Listed height: 6 ft 0 in (1.83 m)
- Listed weight: 232 lb (105 kg)

Career information
- High school: Canon-McMillan (Canonsburg)
- College: Penn State
- NFL draft: 2015: undrafted

Career history
- Miami Dolphins (2015–2019)

Awards and highlights
- Big Ten Linebacker of the Year (2014); First-team All-Big Ten (2014)

Career NFL statistics
- Total tackles: 78
- Fumble recoveries: 1
- Pass deflections: 1
- Interceptions: 1
- Stats at Pro Football Reference

Michael Thomas Hull (born May 25, 1991) is an American former professional football player who was a linebacker for the Miami Dolphins of the National Football League (NFL). He played college football for the Penn State Nittany Lions.

== Early life ==
Born in 1991 to Tom and Donna Hull in Canonsburg, Pennsylvania, Hull was drawn to football early in his life. His father played at Pennsylvania State University from 1971 until 1973, and also played professionally; he was Mike's first coach. In high school, Hull played running back and linebacker at Canon-McMillan, excelling on both sides of the football. Although he drew interest from schools including Ohio State and Michigan, Hull committed to his father's alma mater, Penn State, in 2008.

In addition to football, Hull excelled in wrestling, track and baseball. He was a top wrestler in high school, and despite having separated his shoulder in an all-star football game a month prior, he clinched the victory for his team in the final bout of the 2010 WPIAL championship match. In track & field, Hull posted a personal-best time of 11.56 seconds in the 100-meter dash at the 2010 PIAA District 7 AAA Championships. He also threw the shot put, notching a top-throw of 12.88 meters (42-2) at the 2010 Dick Dei Track Classic.

== College career ==
After redshirting in 2010, Hull contributed on special teams during Penn State's 2011 season. In the wake of sanctions imposed on Penn State due to the Penn State child sex abuse scandal, Hull strongly considered transferring to Pittsburgh, but stayed with Penn State due to Penn State's Linebacker U reputation and encouragement from older players. Ultimately, he was the fourth linebacker on Penn State's 2012 roster, and embodied Penn State's linebacker tradition by working hard on special teams – he blocked a punt in Penn State's game against Ohio State, learning from veteran linebackers Michael Mauti, Gerald Hodges, and Glenn Carson, and making the most of opportunities when they presented themselves, including a 74-yard fumble return for a touchdown against Navy. He concluded the season with 58 tackles, five for a loss, and four sacks. Although Mauti and Hodges graduated, Hull entered the season as a returning "fourth starter", cognizant that his previous season "set the stage" for his future as a starter.

After struggling with a knee injury early in the season, Hull ultimately played in 10 games, starting in eight of them during the 2013 season. He played injured early in the season, noting that "it is what it is", and doing the best he could. After Penn State defeated Michigan in four overtimes, Penn State coach Bill O'Brien commented that Hull "plays a very gritty, instinctive style of football, so when he makes big plays like the pass he broke up against Michigan on the wheel route, that fires the team up." He finished second on the team with 78 tackles, and compiled 4.5 tackles for a loss. Hull converted to inside linebacker for the 2014 season, having predominantly played outside linebacker earlier in his career at Penn State. Concurrently, he assumed a role of vocal leadership on the Penn State defense, and was named a captain by his peers. As the season began, he quickly emerged as one of the best linebackers in the Big Ten, and led the Nittany Lions' defense in tackles early in the season. He recorded 16 of them, a career-high, in Penn State's loss against Northwestern.

== Professional career ==
After going undrafted in the 2015 NFL draft, Hull signed with the Miami Dolphins. On September 5, 2015, Hull was released from the team for final roster cuts, but signed to the team's practice squad a day later. Hull was called up from the Dolphins' practice squad on November 14, 2015, and made his NFL debut on November 15 against the Philadelphia Eagles. On November 28, 2015, he was waived. On December 1, 2015, he was re-signed to the practice squad.

On September 2, 2018, Hull was placed on injured reserve with a knee injury. He was activated off injured reserve on October 31, 2018.

On March 20, 2019, Hull re-signed with the Dolphins. He was placed on reserve/physically unable to perform on August 5, 2019 with a knee injury, ending his season. He was released on March 18, 2020, with a failed physical designation.
