= Bill Belton =

American football player (born 1993)

Biographical details
- Born: February 8, 1993 (age 33); Winslow Township, New Jersey
- Education: Penn State

Playing career
- 2011–2014: Penn State
- Position: Running back

Coaching career (HC unless noted)
- 2020-2021: Winslow Township HS (NJ) (assistant)
- 2022-2025: Winslow Township HS (NJ)
- 2026-Present: St. Augustine Prep (NJ)

William Earl Belton II (born February 2, 1993) is an American former football running back for Penn State Nittany Lions. He was an all-state quarterback at Winslow Township High School.

== Early years ==
Belton was born in 1993 in Sicklerville, New Jersey. He attended Winslow Township High School where he played quarterback and was named all state in New Jersey. He was the first player in New Jersey history to record two consecutive seasons of 2000 passing yards and 1000 rushing yards.

== Recruiting ==
College recruiting
Name	Hometown	School	Height	Weight	40^{‡}	Commit date
Bill Belton; ATH	Sicklerville, New Jersey	Winslow Township High School	5 ft 9 in (1.75 m)	191 lb (87 kg)	4.6	Jan 18, 2011
Bill Belton; ATH	Recruit ratings: Scout: Rivals:					
Overall recruit ranking: Rivals: 234
‡ Refers to 40-yard dash; Note: In many cases, Scout, Rivals, 247Sports, On3, and ESPN may conflict in their listings of height, weight and 40 time.; In these cases, the average was taken. ESPN grades are on a 100-point scale.; Sources: "2011 Team Ranking". Rivals.com.

== College career ==
=== 2011 ===
Belton was a significant component to the offense in his freshman season, working primarily out of the "Wildcat" formation. He totaled 65 rushing yards on 13 carries in 8 games. His best game of the year came in the TicketCity Bowl where he carried the ball 6 times for 35 yards. He was one of only four true freshman to receive significant playing time.

=== 2012 ===
Coming into spring practice, Belton was expected to back up Silas Redd and provide an occasional change of pace. But when Redd transferred to USC in wake of sanctions against the Penn State program, Belton was named the starter. In Penn State's first game against the Ohio Bobcats, Belton carried the ball 13 times for 55 yards. Belton missed the next two games against Virginia and Navy respectively due to an ankle injury. He was expected to return against Temple on September 22, but once again sat out. On Twitter, Belton suggested he would return for the game against Illinois saying "Time for Illinois. Guess who's backkkk". Though Belton did return for the game against Illinois, he has since taken a back seat to running back Zach Zwinak. In the game against Northwestern, Belton recorded only 4 carries for 12 yards, while Zwinak totaled 28 carries for 121 yards and a touchdown. Bill Belton played his best game of the season on October 20 against Iowa. He rushed 16 times for 103 yards and 3 touchdowns. Belton was benched by coach Bill O'Brien against Purdue on November 3 after having a poor week of practice. Teammate Zach Zwinak played instead and posted a 21 rush for 134 yard stat line.

=== 2013 ===
Belton delivered his most productive season as a Nittany Lion. He was second on the team with 1,036 all-purpose yards, good for a 94.2 average. He gained 803 rushing yards on 157 carries for a strong 5.1 average, with a long of 51 yards, and scored five rushing touchdowns. Belton ranked ninth in Big Ten games only at 78.6 rushing yards per game. Against Minnesota, he became the 41st Nittany Lion to record 1,000 career rushing yards, ending the season with 1,131 yards, good for No. 35 on the prestigious list. Belton was tied for sixth on the team with 15 receptions for 158 yards and two scores, with a long catch of 30 yards. Playing in 11 contests and a starter in four games, he also had 75 yards on kickoff returns. Belton joined elite company in the win over Illinois when he gained a career-high 201 yards, becoming the 15th Nittany Lion to rush for at least 200 yards in a game. He delivered Penn State's first 200-yard rushing game since Larry Johnson against Michigan State in 2002 and garnered Big Ten Offensive Player-of-the-Week honors. Belton carried the ball a career-high 36 times, scored on a five-yard run and averaged 5.6 yards per carry en route to his third career 100-yard game. He gained a career-best 209 all-purpose yards against the Illini, adding one reception for eight yards to his rushing total. Belton began the season in his native Garden State, rushing for 22 yards on six carries and delivering three kickoff returns for 66 yards (long of 26 yards) in the win over Syracuse at MetLife Stadium. He ran for 108 yards on nine attempts in the win over Eastern Michigan, scoring twice. His 51-yard touchdown run was a career-long and the team's longest, at the time, since Evan Royster's 69-yard run at Northwestern in 2009. Belton combined with Akeel Lynch (108 yards) to become the 32nd Penn State running back combo to rush for 100 yards in the same game and the first since 2010 against Northwestern (Royster/Silas Redd). Belton carried the ball 13 times for 90 yards (6.9) in the shutout win over Kent State, including a long run of 28 yards that set up a touchdown. He also made a 15-yard touchdown catch in the first quarter against the Flashes. Belton had three catches for 24 yards and one touchdown and ran for 31 yards in the Big Ten-opener at Indiana. Belton ended the longest game in Penn State and Big Ten history when he scored on a two-yard run to give the Nittany Lions a scintillating 43-40 four-overtime win over No. 18 Michigan. He had a then-career-high 27 carries for 85 yards, with 50 yards after the third quarter, and caught three passes for 26 yards, in the win over the Wolverines. He earned an ESPN.com Big Ten Helmet Sticker for his efforts in the Michigan game. Belton gained 98 yards at No. 4 Ohio State, the second-highest rushing total for a running back allowed by the Buckeyes all year. In his first start of the season, he also caught one pass for nine yards against Ohio State. He carried the ball seven times for 47 yards, including a long of 19 yards in the fourth quarter, at Minnesota. He also had a career-high 41 receiving yards on two catches, including a career-long 30-yard catch against the Gophers. In the win over Purdue, Belton had 19 carries for 81 yards, with a five-yard touchdown run to open the scoring. He did not play against Nebraska due to a slight shoulder injury and illness. Belton gained seven yards on three carries in the season-ending win at No. 14 Wisconsin and caught one pass for five yards.

=== 2014 ===
Belton rushed for 508 yards and six touchdowns in 2014 after bouncing between receiver and running back earlier in his career. Also in 2014, he went on to play in the second bowl game of his college career when the Lions played the Boston College Eagles in the 2014 edition of the Pinstripe Bowl at Yankee Stadium. Penn State won the Pinstripe Bowl in Belton's final collegiate game.

== Professional career ==
He was signed in May 2015 to New York Jets but was later cut.

== Coaching career ==
He was hired as Winslow Township High School Offensive Coordinator in 2020 and became the head coach in 2022. On November 20, 2021, he and the Winslow Township Eagles won the NJSIAA Group 4 Central Championship Game. He moved to St. Augustine Prep prior to the 2026 season.
