= Sam Ficken =

American football player (born 1992)

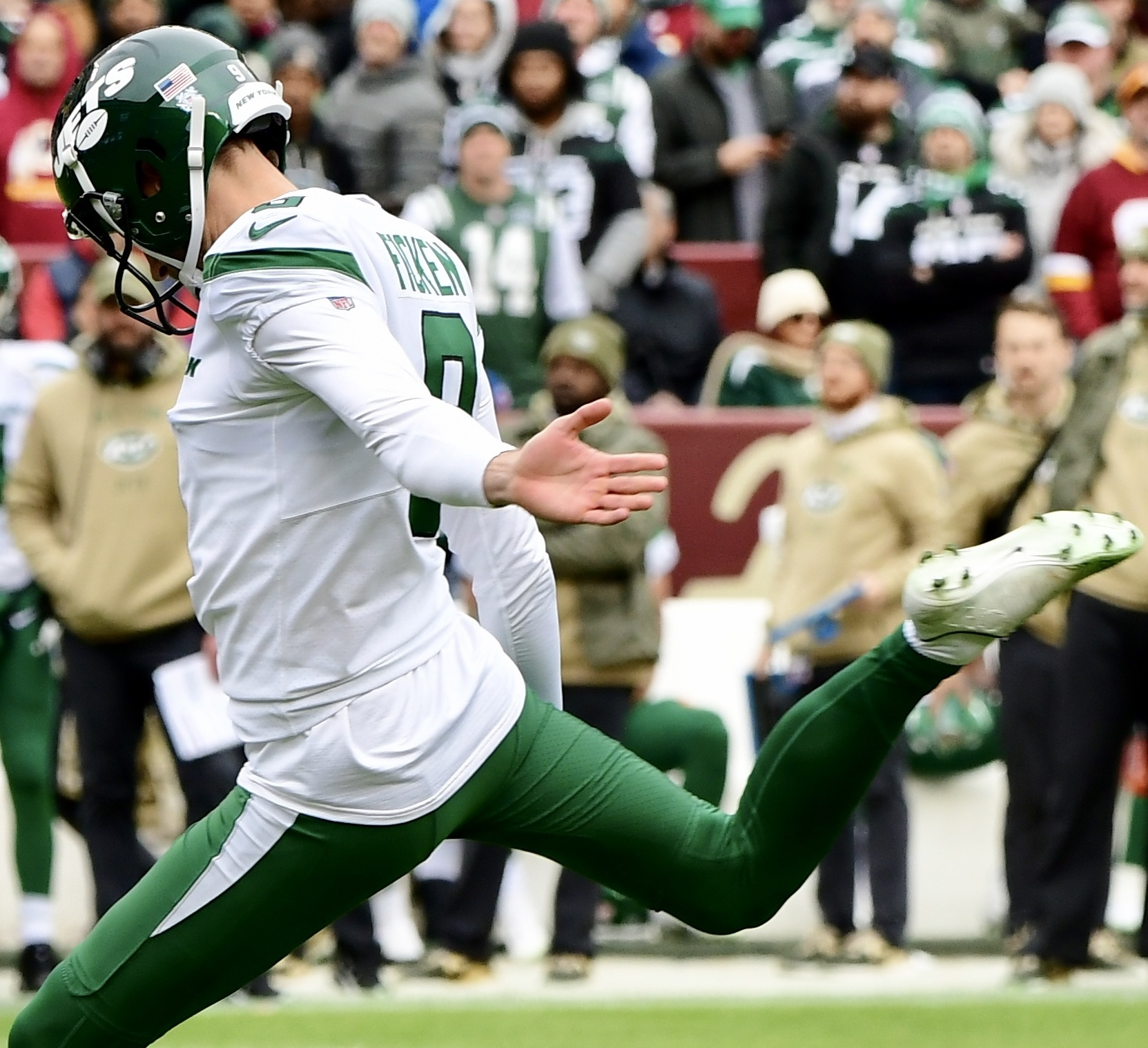
- Ficken with the New York Jets in 2019

No. 5, 9
- Position: Placekicker

Personal information
- Born: December 14, 1992 (age 33); Valparaiso, Indiana, U.S.
- Listed height: 6 ft 1 in (1.85 m)
- Listed weight: 192 lb (87 kg)

Career information
- High school: Valparaiso
- College: Penn State (2011–2014)
- NFL draft: 2015: undrafted

Career history
- Jacksonville Jaguars (2016)*; Kansas City Chiefs (2017)*; Los Angeles Rams (2017–2018); Seattle Seahawks (2019)*; Green Bay Packers (2019)*; New York Jets (2019–2020); Tennessee Titans (2021); Detroit Lions (2022)*
- * Offseason or practice squad member only

Awards and highlights
- Second-team All-Big Ten (2014)

Career NFL statistics
- Field goals made: 35
- Field goal attempts: 48
- Field goal %: 72.9
- Longest field goal: 54
- Touchbacks: 63
- Stats at Pro Football Reference

Samuel James Ficken (born December 14, 1992), nicknamed "Kickin' Ficken", is an American former professional football player who was a placekicker in the National Football League (NFL). He played college football for the Penn State Nittany Lions. He was signed as an undrafted free agent by the Jacksonville Jaguars in 2015, and was also a member of the Kansas City Chiefs, Los Angeles Rams, Seattle Seahawks, Green Bay Packers, New York Jets, Tennessee Titans and Detroit Lions.

== Early life ==
Ficken, a former soccer player, was born in Valparaiso, Indiana, and attended Valparaiso High School, where he was named first-team Associated Press Class 5A all-state kicker. He also was a member of the all-area team. Ficken made 13 field goals during his senior year, including a school-record 52-yard kick. He also had 45 touchbacks on kickoffs.

== College career ==
Ficken saw little action in 2011 behind veteran starting kicker, Anthony Fera. He hit an extra point after touchdown in the opener against Indiana State, as well as kicking off once. He missed his first collegiate field goal attempt in a game against Temple, but rebounded with a completed field goal against Eastern Michigan. Besides two more kickoffs, Ficken did not play for the remainder of the year.

Ficken became the starting kicker in 2012. Ficken started the year off poorly, missing 7 of his first 11 field goals (including one from the one yard line in a game against Illinois, as well as missing 4 out of 5 in a one-point loss to Virginia). However, after being mentored by starting Chicago Bears placekicker Robbie Gould, he finished the year by hitting ten straight successful field goals, putting him 14 for 21 on the year. Ficken also completed 39 of 41 extra-point attempts (one was blocked, the other one was a miss). He was named the Big Ten Conference Special Teams Player of the Week on November 26, 2012, after a 3 for 3 game against the Wisconsin Badgers, one of which was the game-winning kick in overtime.

Ficken made 15 consecutive field goals from October 27, 2012, to September 14, 2013, breaking the Penn State record for consecutive field goals made.

To start the 2014 season, Ficken kicked a last-second, game-winning field goal in the Croke Park Classic. During the Pinstripe Bowl against Boston College, Ficken tied the game with a 44-yard field goal and kicked the game-winning point after touchdown in overtime.

== Professional career ==
Pre-draft measurables
| Height | Weight | Arm length | Hand span |
|---|---|---|---|
| 6 ft 1 1/2 in (1.87 m) | 191 lb (87 kg) | 31 in (0.79 m) | 9 in (0.23 m) |
All values from NFL Combine

After going undrafted during the 2015 NFL draft, Ficken attended the Kansas City Chiefs minicamp in May 2015, but was not signed.

=== Jacksonville Jaguars ===
Ficken was signed by the Jacksonville Jaguars on July 25, 2016. On August 29, he was waived by the Jaguars.

=== Kansas City Chiefs ===
On August 8, 2017, Ficken signed with the Chiefs after an injury to Cairo Santos. He was waived on September 2.

=== Los Angeles Rams ===
On December 20, 2017, Ficken was signed by the Los Angeles Rams to replace injured Pro Bowl kicker Greg Zuerlein. On April 16, 2018, Ficken signed his exclusive rights tender, staying with the Rams. He was waived on August 31. Ficken was re-signed on September 17 following another injury to Greg Zuerlein. On September 23, Ficken made five extra points in a 35–23 win over the Los Angeles Chargers. Ficken was released by the Rams on October 2, after just two games, in which he missed two of his three field goal attempts.

=== Seattle Seahawks ===
On January 11, 2019, Ficken signed a reserve/future contract with the Seattle Seahawks. He was waived by the Seahawks on April 13.

=== Green Bay Packers ===
On April 15, 2019, Ficken was claimed off waivers by the Green Bay Packers. On August 31, Ficken was waived by the Packers.

=== New York Jets ===
Ficken was signed by the New York Jets on September 10, 2019.

Ficken re-signed with the Jets on April 23, 2020. He was placed on injured reserve on November 24, with a groin injury. On December 19, Ficken was activated off of injured reserve. On January 2, 2021, Ficken was waived by the Jets in favor of Chase McLaughlin for the final game of the season. Ficken had missed a field goal and an extra point against the Cleveland Browns in his last game with the Jets. He signed a reserve/future contract with the Jets on January 4. Ficken was waived on July 30.

=== Tennessee Titans ===
On August 1, 2021, Ficken was claimed off waivers by the Tennessee Titans. He was placed on injured reserve on September 11.

=== Detroit Lions ===
On October 11, 2022, Ficken signed with the practice squad of the Detroit Lions.
