= Geno Lewis =

American gridiron football player (born 1993)

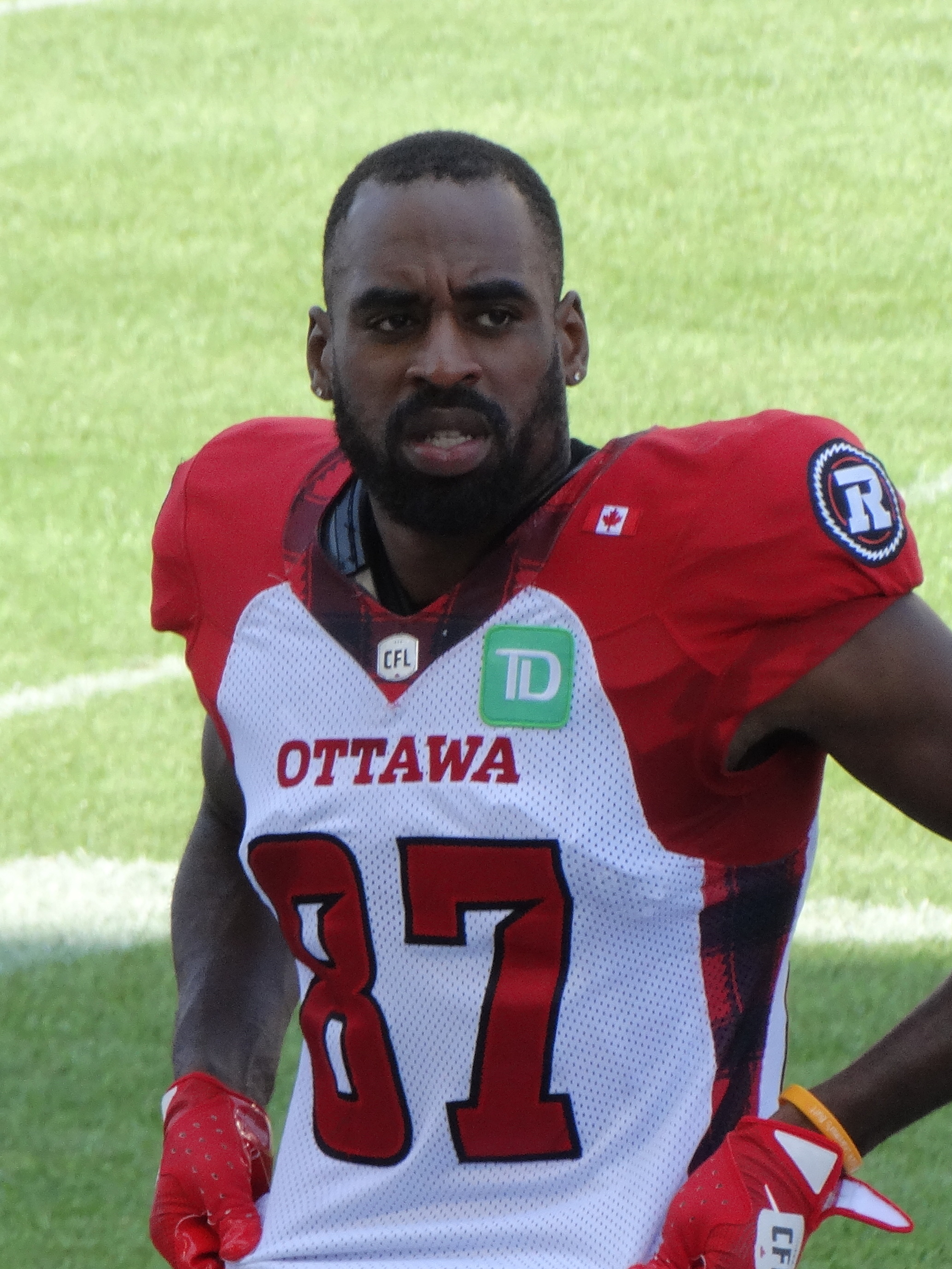
- Lewis with the Ottawa Redblacks in 2025

Profile
- Position: Wide receiver

Personal information
- Born: April 20, 1993 (age 33); Norristown, Pennsylvania, U.S.
- Listed height: 6 ft 1 in (1.85 m)
- Listed weight: 200 lb (91 kg)

Career information
- High school: Plymouth (PA) Wyoming Valley West
- College: Penn State (2012–2015); Oklahoma (2016)

Career history
- Montreal Alouettes (2017–2022); Edmonton Elks (2023–2024); Ottawa Redblacks (2025–2026)

Awards and highlights
- 3× CFL All-Star (2021, 2022, 2024); 4× CFL East All-Star (2019, 2021, 2022, 2025); CFL West All-Star (2024); Terry Evanshen Trophy (2024)

Career CFL statistics as of 2026
- Games played: 122
- Receptions: 493
- Receiving yards: 7,504
- Receiving touchdowns: 47
- Stats at CFL.ca
- Stats at Pro Football Reference

Eugene Brenton Lewis (born April 20, 1993) is an American professional football wide receiver. He most recently played for the Ottawa Redblacks of the Canadian Football League (CFL). He is a five time divisional All-Star and three-time CFL All-Star. He played college football for the Penn State Nittany Lions and Oklahoma Sooners.

== Early life ==
Lewis played four years of football at Wyoming Valley West. He joined Ron Powlus and Raghib Ismail as one of the most heavily recruited players from the Wyoming Valley Conference.

Lewis was recruited to play at Penn State by coach Joe Paterno, though he also had offers from Oregon and Virginia Tech, among other schools.

== College career ==
Lewis played for the Penn State Nittany Lions from 2012 to 2015. He was redshirted in 2012. He transferred to play for the Oklahoma Sooners in 2016. He played in 51 games, starting 19, during his college career, catching 122 passes for 1,569 yards and 10 touchdowns.

== Professional career ==
=== Pre-draft ===
Lewis was rated the 71st best wide receiver in the 2017 NFL draft by NFLDraftScout.com.

Pre-draft measurables
Height	Weight	Arm length	Hand span	Wingspan	40-yard dash	10-yard split	20-yard split	20-yard shuttle	Three-cone drill	Vertical jump	Broad jump	Bench press
6 ft 0 3/4 in (1.85 m)	204 lb (93 kg)	32 3/8 in (0.82 m)	9 3/4 in (0.25 m)	6 ft 5 7/8 in (1.98 m)	4.62 s	1.59 s	2.67 s	4.35 s	7.09 s	38.5 in (0.98 m)	10 ft 9 in (3.28 m)	9 reps
All values from Pro Day

After going undrafted, Lewis attended rookie minicamp with the Cincinnati Bengals and Seattle Seahawks in May 2017.

=== Montreal Alouettes ===
Lewis signed with the Montreal Alouettes of the Canadian Football League (CFL) on June 12, 2017. His first season in the CFL was quiet, playing on only two games and catching seven passes. Lewis briefly restarted his basketball career in November 2017 with the NEPA Stars & Stripes franchise in the American Basketball Association. In the following two seasons in the CFL, Lewis became a starting wide receiver for the Alouettes, playing in all 36 regular season games and catching a combined 116 passes for 1,960 yards with nine touchdowns. Lewis was named a CFL East All-Star following the 2019 season. After the 2020 season was cancelled due to Covid-19 pandemic he re-signed with the Alouettes on December 16, 2020. Lewis had an outstanding season in 2021, catching 62 passes for 964 yards with nine touchdowns. His strong play was rewarded as he was named a CFL All-Star for the first time in his career. On December 16, 2021, Lewis and the Alouettes agreed to a contract extension through the 2022 CFL season. Lewis had an outstanding season with the Alouettes in 2022, playing in 17 regular season games and catching 91 passes for 1,303 yards with 10 touchdowns. He finished second in the league in receptions, and third in both receiving yards and touchdown receptions. He was named the East Division's Most Outstanding Player, earning the Terry Evanshen Trophy in the process. In late January 2023, as a pending free agent, Lewis took to social media to announce his intention to enter free agency in February.

=== Edmonton Elks ===
Lewis joined the Edmonton Elks as a free agent on February 14, 2023. On June 29, 2023, Lewis was placed on the six-game injured list with a knee injury. At the time of the injury he had played in three games, and caught 11 passes for 200 yards and one touchdown. He returned in week 11 and played in the last nine games of the season, recording a total of 48 receptions for 844 yards and three touchdowns in just 12 games. In 2024, he played in all 18 regular season games where he had 74 receptions for 1,070 yards and ten touchdowns. To finish the season, he had touchdown receptions in eight straight games, breaking the previous franchise record of seven. He was named a CFL All-Star for the fourth time in his career.

=== Ottawa Redblacks ===
On February 12, 2025, Lewis signed with the Ottawa Redblacks to a two-year contract. In the first game of the season, he extended his consecutive games with a touchdown reception to nine, but fell one short of tying the CFL record of ten, held by Terry Evanshen. He played in all 18 regular season games in 2025 where he recorded 75 receptions for 1,012 yards and six touchdowns. On January 15, 2026, it was announced that Lewis had signed a contract extension through the 2027 season. However, after recording just 20 receptions for 231 yards in six games, he was released on August 2, 2026.
