= Deion Barnes =

American football player (born 1993)

Current position
- Title: Defensive ends/outside linebackers coach
- Team: South Carolina
- Conference: SEC

Biographical details
- Born: January 20, 1993 (age 33); Philadelphia, Pennsylvania, U.S.
- Education: Penn State

Playing career
- 2011–2014: Penn State
- 2015–2016: New York Jets*
- 2016: Kansas City Chiefs*
- 2019: San Antonio Commanders
- Position: Outside linebacker

Coaching career (HC unless noted)
- 2020–2022: Penn State (GA)
- 2023–2025: Penn State (DL)
- 2026–present: South Carolina (DE/OLB)

Accomplishments and honors

Awards
- Big Ten Freshman of the Year (2012)

Deion Deryl Barnes (born January 20, 1993) is an American former football outside linebacker and the current defensive ends/outside linebackers coach at the University of South Carolina . He played high school football at Northeast High School and college football at Penn State, earning Big Ten Freshman of the Year in 2012. Barnes was a member of the New York Jets, Kansas City Chiefs and was with the San Antonio Commanders during the short-lived Alliance of American Football (AAF) in 2019.

== Professional career ==
=== New York Jets ===
Barnes was signed as an undrafted free agent by the New York Jets on May 8, 2015. On August 28, 2016, Barnes was waived by the Jets.

=== Kansas City Chiefs ===
On October 19, the Kansas City Chiefs signed Barnes to their practice squad. He was released by the Chiefs on October 26, 2016.

=== San Antonio Commanders ===
In 2018, Barnes joined the San Antonio Commanders of the Alliance of American Football. The league ceased operations in April 2019.
