= 2013 Penn State Nittany Lions football team =

American college football season

2013 Penn State Nittany Lions football

Lambert-Meadowlands Trophy
- Conference: Big Ten Conference
- Leaders Division
- Record: 7–5 (4–4 Big Ten)
- Head coach: Bill O'Brien (2nd season)
- Offensive scheme: Spread option
- Defensive coordinator: John Butler (1st season)
- Base defense: 4–3
- Captains: Glenn Carson; Ty Howle; DaQuan Jones; John Urschel; Pat Zerbe
- Home stadium: Beaver Stadium

2013 Big Ten Conference football standings
	Conf.			Overall
Team	W		L	W		L
Legends Division
No. 3 Michigan State x$	8	–	0	13	–	1
Iowa	5	–	3	8	–	5
Nebraska	5	–	3	9	–	4
Minnesota	4	–	4	8	–	5
Michigan	3	–	5	7	–	6
Northwestern	1	–	7	5	–	7
Leaders Division
No. 12 Ohio State x%	8	–	0	12	–	2
No. 22 Wisconsin	6	–	2	9	–	4
Penn State*	4	–	4	7	–	5
Indiana	3	–	5	5	–	7
Illinois	1	–	7	4	–	8
Purdue	0	–	8	1	–	11
Championship: Michigan State 34, Ohio State 24
$ – BCS representative as conference champion; % – BCS at-large representative; x – Division champion/co-champions; Penn State ineligible for conference championship game and post-season bowl games due to NCAA sanctions; Rankings from AP Poll

The 2013 Penn State Nittany Lions football team represented Pennsylvania State University in the 2013 NCAA Division I FBS football season. The team was coached by Bill O'Brien and played its home games in Beaver Stadium in University Park, Pennsylvania. They were a member of the Big Ten Conference and its Leaders Division. Penn State was ineligible to play in a bowl game for the 2013 season, the second season of a four-year ban, due to NCAA sanctions imposed in the wake of the Penn State child sex abuse scandal.

Before the season, Penn State had an open competition to win the starting quarterback position; true freshman Christian Hackenberg started all 12 games for the Nittany Lions. Hackenberg headlined their recruiting class, which also featured tight end Adam Breneman. John Butler was named Penn State's new defensive coordinator upon the departure of Ted Roof. Most predicted Penn State would have a similar season to that of the 2012 team, which won eight games and lost four, but there was uncertainty, as injuries could decimate the team, which was already thin at many positions including offensive line and linebacker, while surprise performances from key players could lift them to success.

Penn State opened the season with two non-conference wins, but lost to the UCF Knights, who ultimately went on to a BCS bowl, the Fiesta, in their third game. Entering conference play, the Nittany Lions were 3–1, and in their first conference game they lost to Indiana before defeating Michigan in a quadruple-overtime thriller. They alternated losses and wins for the remainder of the season, losing to Ohio State, Minnesota, and Nebraska, and defeating Illinois, Purdue, and Wisconsin.

Despite the team never being ranked, several players earned national and conference recognition, headlined by wide receiver Allen Robinson, who was named the Big Ten Conference Receiver of the Year and earned first team all-conference and All-American honors before subsequently announcing he would forgo his senior season and enter the 2014 NFL draft. Senior John Urschel, an offensive guard, won the William V. Campbell Trophy—sometimes referred to as the "academic Heisman". Hackenberg was named Big Ten Freshman of the Year. Additionally, backup quarterback Tyler Ferguson, who lost the preseason quarterback competition to Hackenberg, announced his intent to transfer. Soon after the season, two coaches—Ron Vanderlinden and Charlie Fisher—left Penn State for undisclosed reasons, though there was speculation that O'Brien forced them out. A few weeks later, O'Brien accepted the head coaching position with the Houston Texans, leaving the Nittany Lions after two seasons. Early in 2014, the Nittany Lions hired James Franklin to replace O'Brien as head coach for the 2014 season.

== Recruiting ==
Despite NCAA sanctions including limited scholarships and a bowl ban, Penn State retained their top recruit: quarterback Christian Hackenberg. They finished with the 24th ranked recruiting class according to ESPN, who cited retention of top prospects Hackenberg and tight end Adam Breneman, as well as adding depth in the secondary, overall giving them a "B" rating. Linebacker recruit Zayd Issah never enrolled at Penn State after several instances of legal trouble. Entering camp, Hackenberg and Ferguson vied for the starting quarterback position; ultimately, Hackenberg won the job, and Ferguson served as the backup.

College recruiting
Name	Hometown	School	Height	Weight	40^{‡}	Commit date
Christian Hackenberg; QB	Fork Union, VA	Fork Union Military Academy	6 ft 4 in (1.93 m)	212 lb (96 kg)	4.84	Feb 29, 2012
Christian Hackenberg; QB	Recruit ratings: Scout: Rivals: (88)					
Adam Breneman; TE	Camp Hill, PA	Cedar Cliff High School	6 ft 4 in (1.93 m)	229 lb (104 kg)	–	Mar 9, 2012
Adam Breneman; TE	Recruit ratings: Scout: Rivals: (85)					
Brendan Mahon; OG	Randolph, NJ	Randolph High School	6 ft 5 in (1.96 m)	300 lb (140 kg)	–	Mar 17, 2012
Brendan Mahon; OG	Recruit ratings: Scout: Rivals: (83)					
Andrew Nelson; OT	Hershey, PA	Hershey High School	6 ft 5 in (1.96 m)	262 lb (119 kg)	5.00	Apr 15, 2012
Andrew Nelson; OT	Recruit ratings: Scout: Rivals: (82)					
DaeSean Hamilton; WR	Stafford, VA	Mountain View High School	6 ft 0 in (1.83 m)	185 lb (84 kg)	4.57	Dec 9, 2012
DaeSean Hamilton; WR	Recruit ratings: Scout: Rivals: (81)					
Garrett Sickels; DE	Little Silver, NJ	Red Bank Regional High School	6 ft 4 in (1.93 m)	225 lb (102 kg)	4.68	Mar 4, 2012
Garrett Sickels; DE	Recruit ratings: Scout: Rivals: (80)					
Richy Anderson; RB/WR	Frederick, MD	Governor Thomas Johnson High School	5 ft 10 in (1.78 m)	180 lb (82 kg)	–	Oct 28, 2012
Richy Anderson; RB/WR	Recruit ratings: Scout: Rivals: (77)					
Brandon Bell; OLB	Mays Landing, NJ	Oakcrest High School	6 ft 0 in (1.83 m)	222 lb (101 kg)	4.6	Jun 13, 2012
Brandon Bell; OLB	Recruit ratings: Scout: Rivals: (77)					
Tyler Ferguson; QB	Bakersfield, CA	College of the Sequoias (JUCO)	6 ft 4 in (1.93 m)	200 lb (91 kg)	–	Dec 14, 2012
Tyler Ferguson; QB	Recruit ratings: Scout: Rivals: (77)					
Jordan Smith; CB	Washington D.C.	Howard D. Woodson High School	5 ft 11 in (1.80 m)	180 lb (82 kg)	–	Aug 11, 2012
Jordan Smith; CB	Recruit ratings: Scout: Rivals: (77)					
Neiko Robinson; S	Escambia County, FL	Northview High School	6 ft 0 in (1.83 m)	162 lb (73 kg)	4.51	Jun 4, 2012
Neiko Robinson; S	Recruit ratings: Scout: Rivals: (75)					
Zayd Issah; LB	Harrisburg, PA	Central Dauphin High School	6 ft 3 in (1.91 m)	210 lb (95 kg)	4.57	Dec 9, 2012
Zayd Issah; LB	Recruit ratings: Scout: Rivals: (75)					
Kasey Gaines; S	Loganville, GA	Grayson High School	5 ft 9 in (1.75 m)	165 lb (75 kg)	4.5	Sep 19, 2012
Kasey Gaines; S	Recruit ratings: Scout: Rivals: (71)					
Curtis Cothran; DE	Newtown, Bucks County, Pennsylvania	Council Rock High School North	6 ft 5 in (1.96 m)	240 lb (110 kg)	–	Mar 26, 2012
Curtis Cothran; DE	Recruit ratings: Scout: Rivals: (70)					
Tanner Hartman; OG	Lynchburg, VA	Liberty Christian Academy	6 ft 4 in (1.93 m)	255 lb (116 kg)	4.9	Jul 13, 2012
Tanner Hartman; OG	Recruit ratings: Scout: Rivals: (69)					
Parker Cothren; DT	Hazel Green, AL	Hazel Green High School	6 ft 5 in (1.96 m)	265 lb (120 kg)	–	Nov 20, 2012
Parker Cothren; DT	Recruit ratings: Scout: Rivals: (69)					
Anthony Smith; DB	Randolph, NJ	Cathedral Prep	6 ft 1 in (1.85 m)	180 lb (82 kg)	–	Dec 9, 2012
Anthony Smith; DB	Recruit ratings: Scout: Rivals: (67)					
Overall recruit ranking: Scout: 46 Rivals: 43 ESPN: 24
‡ Refers to 40-yard dash; Note: In many cases, Scout, Rivals, 247Sports, On3, and ESPN may conflict in their listings of height, weight and 40 time.; In these cases, the average was taken. ESPN grades are on a 100-point scale.; Sources: "Penn State recruiting - Rivals.com". Rivals.; "Penn State recruiting - Scout.com". Scout.; "Penn State football recruits". ESPN.; "Scout.com Team Recruiting Rankings". Scout.; "2013 Team Ranking". Rivals.com.

== Preseason buildup ==
Coming off an 8–4 season during which, according to USA Today's Paul Myerberg, "Attrition robbed Penn State of everything but the kitchen sink, or so we heard, so it was quite surprising when the sink, a few walk-ons, a mathematician, a local kid and a rookie coach went 8–2 after a sluggish start, pushing back against storm clouds and bringing PSU back from the abyss of life post-NCAA sanctions." Many college football analysts expected the Nittany Lions to perform similarly in 2013, although almost all season outlooks noted that the team could take a major step back from 2012 if they were hampered by injuries, or could surprise everyone and win more games than they did in 2012.

A solid backfield anchored by Zach Zwinak, a trio of established tight ends plus a promising newcomer, and a veteran offensive line highlighted the projected success offensively, while a new coordinator (John Butler), a "borderline All-American" linebacker (Glenn Carson), and much potential both on the defensive line and in the secondary, the latter of which was "dramatically improved", highlighted projected progress defensively. Also, a quarterback competition between Christian Hackenberg and Tyler Ferguson brewed, which provided intrigue entering the season. For Penn State to achieve success, they needed to avoid injuries that would hinder their already depleted depth due to NCAA sanctions. SBNation.com asserted, "If either Hackenberg or Ferguson gets hurt, and the other one stinks ... if either Zach Zwinak or Bill Belton (who missed four games last year) gets hurt ... if basically any linemen get hurt (and linemen often get hurt) ... this house of cards comes tumbling down." ESPN.com reporter Josh Moyer wrote, "In short, like last year, PSU is a bit of a wild card. If it receives strong efforts from its quarterback and the front seven, it should surpass last year's record. If it doesn't, it might be fortunate to get to seven wins."

== Schedule ==
Date	Time	Opponent	Site	TV	Result	Attendance
August 31	3:30 p.m.	vs. Syracuse*	MetLife Stadium; East Rutherford, NJ (rivalry)	ABC/ESPN2	W 23–17	61,202
September 7	12:00 p.m.	Eastern Michigan*	Beaver Stadium; University Park, PA	BTN	W 45–7	92,863
September 14	6:00 p.m.	UCF*	Beaver Stadium; University Park, PA	BTN	L 31–34	92,855
September 21	3:30 p.m.	Kent State*	Beaver Stadium; University Park, PA	BTN	W 34–0	92,371
October 5	12:00 p.m.	at Indiana	Memorial Stadium; Bloomington, IN	BTN	L 24–44	42,125
October 12	5:00 p.m.	No. 18 Michigan^{†}	Beaver Stadium; University Park, PA (rivalry)	ESPN	W 43–40 ^{4OT}	107,884
October 26	8:00 p.m.	at No. 4 Ohio State	Ohio Stadium; Columbus, OH (rivalry)	ABC	L 14–63	105,889
November 2	12:00 p.m.	Illinois	Beaver Stadium; University Park, PA	ESPN	W 24–17 ^{OT}	95,131
November 9	12:00 p.m.	at Minnesota	TCF Bank Stadium; Minneapolis, MN (Governor's Victory Bell)	ESPN2	L 10–24	48,123
November 16	12:00 p.m.	Purdue	Beaver Stadium; University Park, PA	BTN	W 45–21	96,491
November 23	3:30 p.m.	Nebraska	Beaver Stadium; University Park, PA	BTN	L 20–23 ^{OT}	98,517
November 30	3:30 p.m.	at No. 14 Wisconsin	Camp Randall Stadium; Madison, WI	ESPN	W 31–24	78,064
*Non-conference game; ^{†}Homecoming; Rankings from AP Poll released prior to the game; All times are in Eastern time

== Personnel ==
=== Coaching staff ===
Name	Position	Season at Penn State	Season in current role	Alma mater
Bill O'Brien	Head Coach	2nd	2nd	Brown (1992)
John Butler	Defensive coordinator/Cornerbacks	2nd	1st	Catholic University (1994)
Charlie Fisher	Quarterbacks	2nd	2nd	Springfield College (1981)
Stan Hixon	Assistant Head Coach/Wide Receivers	2nd	2nd	Iowa State (1979)
Larry Johnson	Defensive Line	18th	14th	Elizabeth City State (1973)
Charles London	Running Backs/Recruiting Coordinator	2nd	2nd	Duke (1996)
Mac McWhorter	Offensive Line	2nd	2nd	Georgia (1974)
Anthony Midget	Safeties	1st	1st	Virginia Tech (2000)
John Strollo	Tight Ends	2nd	2nd	Boston College (1976)
Ron Vanderlinden	Linebackers	13th	13th	Albion (1977)

- Craig Fitzgerald – Strength and Conditioning
- Brian Bell – Assistant Strength and Conditioning

Graduate assistants

- Offense – Bartley Webb, Steven Williams
- Defense – Tim Kelly, Will Lawing

=== Position key ===
Back	B	Center	C	Cornerback	CB	Defensive back	DB
Defensive end	DE	Defensive lineman	DL	Defensive tackle	DT	End	E
Fullback	FB	Guard	G	Halfback	HB	Kicker	K
Kickoff returner	KR	Offensive tackle	OT	Offensive lineman	OL	Linebacker	LB
Long snapper	LS	Punter	P	Punt returner	PR	Quarterback	QB
Running back	RB	Safety	S	Tight end	TE	Wide receiver	WR

=== Roster ===
2013 Penn State Nittany Lions football team roster
Players
Coaches
Offense

Pos.	#	Name	Class
RB	1	Bill Belton	Jr
WR	2	DaeSean Hamilton	Fr
WR	2	Jake Kiley	Fr
QB	3	Austin Whipple	Fr
QB	5	Tyler Ferguson	So
WR	6	Chris Geiss	Fr
WR	7	Geno Lewis	Fr
WR	8	Allen Robinson	Jr
WR	10	Deshawn Baker	So
TE	11	Brent Wilkerson	Fr
QB	12	Jack Seymour	Fr
QB	14	Christian Hackenberg	Fr
WR	15	Alex Kenney	Jr
QB	17	D. J. Crook	Fr
TE	18	Jesse James	So
WR	19	Richy Anderson	Fr
RB	21	Brian Tomasetti	Fr
RB	22	Akeel Lynch	Fr
RB	25	Von Walker	Fr
RB	27	Adam Geiger	Fr
RB	28	Zach Zwinak	Jr
FB	32	Jack Haffner	Fr
RB	33	Chip Chiappialle	Fr
FB	34	Dominic Salomone	Fr
FB	35	Pat Zerbe	Sr
RB	36	Deron Thompson	So
C	55	Wendy Laurent	Fr
G/T	56	Anthony Alosi	So
G	57	Tanner Hartman	Fr
OT	58	Adam Gress	Sr
OT	59	Andrew Nelson	Fr
C	60	Ty Howle	Sr
G	64	John Urschel	Sr
C	65	Miles Dieffenbach	Jr
G	66	Angelo Mangiro	So
OL	67	Andrew Terlingo	Fr
G	68	Bryan Davie	Jr
G	70	Brendan Mahon	Fr
OL	73	Austin Fiedler	Fr
OL	74	Evan Galimberti	Fr
G	75	Eric Shrive	Sr
OT	76	Donovan Smith	So
OT	77	Garry Gilliam	Jr
OL	78	Tom Devenney	Fr
OT	79	Kevin Blanchard	So
WR	80	Matt Zanellato	So
TE	81	Adam Breneman	Fr
WR	82	Gregg Garrity	Fr
WR	83	Luke Vadas	Fr
TE	84	Matt Lehman	Sr
WR	85	Brandon Felder	Sr
TE	87	Kyle Carter	So
WR	88	Jonathan Warner	Fr
TE	89	Tom Pancoast	Fr

Defense

Pos.	#	Name	Class
S	1	Malcolm Willis	Sr
CB	3	Da'Quan Davis	So
S	4	Adrian Amos	Jr
LB	5	Nyeem Wartman	Fr
S	6	Malik Golden	Fr
S/LB	7	Stephen Obeng-Agyapong	Sr
LB	8	Gary Wooten	Fr
CB	9	Jordan Lucas	So
CB	10	Trevor Williams	So
CB	12	Jordan Smith	Fr
CB	13	Jesse Merise	So
DB	14	Kasey Gaines	Fr
CB	16	Devin Pryor	So
DB	17	Dad Poquie	Fr
DE	18	Deion Barnes	So
LB	22	T.J. Rhattigan	So
S	23	Ryan Keiser	Jr
CB	24	Anthony Smith	Fr
LB	26	Brandon Bell	Fr
S	27	Colin Harrop	Fr
LB	30	Charles Idemudia	Fr
DE	31	Brad Bars	Jr
LB	32	Kyle Searfoss	Fr
DB	34	Jordan Dudas	Jr
LB	35	Matthew Baney	So
LB	36	Hunter Crafford	Fr
LB	38	Ben Kline	So
CB	39	Jesse Della Valle	Jr
LB	40	Glenn Carson	Sr
DT	41	Parker Cothren	Fr
LB	42	Carter Henderson	Fr
LB	43	Mike Hull	Jr
LB	46	Adam Cole	Fr
LB	47	Brandon Smith	Fr
LB	48	Ryan Ammerman	Fr
LB	49	Garth Lakitsky	Jr
LB	50	Mike Wiand	Fr
LB	51	Drew Boyce	So
DE	52	Curtis Cothran	Fr
DT	53	Derek Dowrey	Fr
DT	72	Brian Gaia	Fr
DT	84	Kyle Baublitz	Jr
DE	86	C.J. Olaniyan	Jr
DT	88	Tyrone Smith	Jr
DE	90	Garrett Sickels	Fr
DT	91	DaQuan Jones	Sr
DE	92	Albert Hall	Fr
DE	94	Evan Schwan	Fr
DE	95	Carl Nassib	So
DE	98	Anthony Zettel	So
DT	99	Austin Johnson	Fr

Special teams

Pos.	#	Name	Class
K, P	37	Chris Gulla	Fr
SN	44	Tyler Yazujian	Fr
P	45	Alex Butterworth	Sr
SN	54	Sean Corcoran	Fr
SN	61	Zach Ladonis	Fr
PK	97	Sam Ficken	Jr

Head coach

- Bill O'Brien (head coach/offensive coordinator)

Coordinators/assistant coaches

- Stan Hixon (assistant head coach/wide receivers)
- John Butler (defensive coordinator/cornerbacks coach)
- Charlie Fisher (quarterbacks coach)
- Larry Johnson (defensive line coach)
- Charles London (running backs coach)
- Mac McWhorter (offensive line coach)
- Anthony Midget (safeties coach)
- John Strollo (tight ends coach)
- Ron Vanderlinden (linebackers coach)
- Craig Fitzgerald (strength and conditioning coach)
- Tim Kelly (graduate assistant)
- Will Lawing (graduate assistant)
- Bartley Webb (graduate assistant)
- Steven Williams (graduate assistant)

Legend

- (C) Team captain
- (S) Suspended
- (I) Ineligible
- Injured
- Redshirt

Roster

=== Depth chart ===
Defense

FS
Malcolm Willis
Jesse Della Valle

WLB	MLB	SLB
⋅	Glenn Carson	⋅
Brandon Bell	Gary Wooten	⋅

SS
Ryan Keiser
Jesse Della Valle

CB
Adrian Amos
Trevor Williams (American football)

DE	DT	DT	DE
C. J. Olaniyan	DaQuan Jones	Kyle Baublitz	Deion Barnes
Carl Nassib	Brian Gaia	Austin Johnson	Anthony Zettel

CB
Jordan Lucas
Da'Quan Davis

Offense

WR
Allen Robinson
Alex Kenney

LT	LG	C	RG	RT
Donovan Smith	Miles Dieffenbach	Ty Howle	John Urschel	Adam Gress
Adam Gress	Angelo Mangiro	Wendy Laurent	Angelo Mangiro	Garry Gilliam

TE
Jesse James
Kyle Carter

WR
Brandon Felder
Eugene Lewis

QB
Christian Hackenberg
Tyler Ferguson

Key reserves
RB Akeel Lynch
WR Matt Zanellato
TE Adam Breneman
OL Anthony Alosi
DT Tyrone Smith
DT Derek Dowrey
LB Charles Idemudia
CB Jordan Smith

RB
Zach Zwinak
Bill Belton

FB
Pat Zerbe
Brandon Smith

Special teams
PK Sam Ficken
P Alex Butterworth
KR Eugene Lewis, Von Walker
PR Jesse Della Valle, Von Walker
LS Zach Ladonis
H Alex Butterworth

== Game summaries ==
=== August 31 vs. Syracuse ===
Penn State vs. Syracuse – Game summary

Quarter	1	2	3	4	Total
Penn State	0	6	7	10	23
Syracuse	0	3	7	7	17

at MetLife Stadium

- Date: August 31
- Game time: 3:30 p.m. EDT
- Game weather: 83 °F (28 °C), broken clouds
- Game attendance: 61,202
- Referee: Mike Defee
- TV announcers (ESPN/ABC): Mike Patrick (play-by-play), Ed Cunningham (analyst), Tom Rinaldi (reporter), Jeannine Edwards (sideline)
- ESPN Box Score

Game information

First quarter

- No scoring

Second quarter

- SYR – Ross Krautman, 32-yard field goal, 12:32 (SYR 3–0)
- PSU – Sam Ficken, 36-yard field goal, 5:55 (TIE 3–3)
- PSU – Sam Ficken, 35-yard field goal, 0:55 (PSU 6–3)

Third quarter

- PSU – Allen Robinson, 51 yard pass from Christian Hackenberg, Ficken XP good, 11:46 (PSU 13–3)
- SYR – Jerome Smith, 10 yard run, Krautman XP good, 11:05 (PSU 13–10)

Fourth quarter

- PSU – Sam Ficken, 46-yard field goal, 14:16 (PSU 16–10)
- PSU – Eugene Lewis, 54-yard pass from Christian Hackenberg, Ficken XP good, 11:39 (PSU 23–10)
- SYR – Jerome Smith, 1 yard run, Krautman XP good, 6:58 (PSU 23–16)

Top passer

- Christian Hackenberg- 22/31, 278 yards, 2 TD, 2 INT

Top rusher

- Zach Zwinak – 24 rushes, 62 yards

Top receiver

- Allen Robinson – 7 receptions, 133 yards, TD

Top defender

- DaQuan Jones – 9 tackles, 3 tackles for loss, 1 sack

Note: Though the game was held at a neutral site, Penn State wore white uniforms and was considered the away team.

Prior to the game, Penn State coach Bill O'Brien hoped to keep his choice between Tyler Ferguson and Christian Hackenberg as starting quarterback a secret until the first snap. However, the night before the game, media reports began to surface that Hackenberg was going to be the starter. Hackenberg did start for the Nittany Lions, while Oklahoma transfer Drew Allen started for Syracuse, who had a quarterback competition as well. After Hackenberg played the first two drives for Penn State, Ferguson came in and promptly fumbled the football for a turnover and did not return. Allen Robinson, the Big Ten's leading receiver in 2012, did not start for what O'Brien said was, "between me and Allen", but he did play in the second half.

After a scoreless first quarter, the second quarter featured three turnovers, and at half time, Penn State led 6–3 with two field goals from senior kicker Sam Ficken. On Penn State's first drive in the second half, Allen Robinson returned and caught a screen pass, which he ran for 25 yards, and then a 51-yard touchdown pass to make the score 13–3. On the ensuing drive, however, Syracuse came right back and scored a touchdown via a Jerome Smith 10-yard run. Early in the fourth quarter, Ficken made his third field goal of the day, a career-long 46 yards. Later in the quarter, Hackenberg threw a 54-yard touchdown pass to Eugene Lewis to make the score 23–10. When only down by 6 points, Syracuse got the ball around their own 45-yard line with a little over two minutes left, but turned the ball over via an interception with under two minutes to play.

Hackenberg was named the Big Ten freshman of the week after totaling 278 passing yards, two touchdowns, and two interceptions, and Ficken was named Big Ten special teams player of the week, redeeming himself from the 2012 season, after kicking three field goals including a career-long 46-yard kick. Seniors DaQuan Jones and Stephen Obeng-Agyapong led the team defensively with nine tackles, including three for a loss, and a sack at defensive tackle, and eight tackles, a sack, a forced fumble that he recovered, and an interception at safety and linebacker respectively. After it was announced that Penn State lost senior tight end Matt Lehman for the season with a knee injury during the game, O'Brien announced that Obeng-Agyapong might practice with the tight ends to help replace him.

Penn State starting lineup

Offense
Position	Player	Class
LT	Donovan Smith	SO
LG	Miles Dieffenbach	JR
C	Ty Howle	SR
RG	John Urschel	SR
RT	Garry Gilliam	JR
TE	Jesse James	SO
QB	Christian Hackenberg	FR
RB	Zach Zwinak	JR
TE	Kyle Carter	SO
TE	Matt Lehman	SR
WR	Brandon Felder	SR

Defense
Position	Player	Class
DE	C. J. Olaniyan	JR
DT	DaQuan Jones	SR
DT	Kyle Baublitz	JR
DE	Deion Barnes	SO
OLB	Mike Hull	JR
MLB	Glenn Carson	SR
OLB	Nyeem Wartman	FR
CB	Trevor Williams (American football)	SO
S	Malcolm Willis	SR
S	Adrian Amos	JR
CB	Jordan Lucas	SO

Special teams
Position	Player	Class
K	Sam Ficken	JR
P	Alex Butterworth	SR

=== September 7 vs. Eastern Michigan ===
Penn State vs. Eastern Michigan – Game summary

Quarter	1	2	3	4	Total
Eastern Michigan	7	0	0	0	7
Penn State	7	10	7	21	45

at Beaver Stadium

- Date: September 7
- Game time: 12:00 p.m. EDT
- Game weather: 75 °F (24 °C), partly cloudy
- Game attendance: 92,863
- Referee: Bill LeMonnier
- TV announcers (Big Ten Network): Scott Graham (play-by-play), Chuck Long (analyst)
- ESPN Box Score

Game information

First quarter

- EMU – Hunter Matt returns Christian Hackenberg fumble 11 yards, Dylan Mulder XP good, 4:01 (EMU 7–0)
- PSU – Zach Zwinak, 2 yard run, Sam Ficken XP good, 1:41 (TIE 7–7)

Second quarter

- PSU – Bill Belton, 5 yard run, Sam Ficken XP good, 14:08 (PSU 14–7)
- PSU – Sam Ficken, 39 yard field goal, 0:17 (PSU 17–7)

Third quarter

- PSU – Zach Zwinak, 7 yard run, Sam Ficken XP good, 2:09 (PSU 24–7)

Fourth quarter

- PSU – Allen Robinson, 45 yard pass from Christian Hackenberg, Sam Ficken XP good, 13:15 (PSU 31–7)
- PSU – Bill Belton, 51 yard run, Sam Ficken XP good, 9:47 (PSU 38–7)
- PSU – Akeel Lynch, 18 yard run, Sam Ficken XP good, 4:26 (PSU 45–7)

Top passer

- Christian Hackenberg – 23/33, 311 yards, TD, INT

Top rushers

- Bill Belton – 9 rushes, 108 yards, 2 TD
- Akeel Lynch – 13 rushes, 108 yards, TD
- Zach Zwinak – 7 rushes, 43 yards, 2 TD

Top receiver

- Allen Robinson – 7 receptions, 129 yards, TD

Top defender

- Glenn Carson – 10 tackles, sack

Prior to the game, Penn State was predicted to have the advantage on both sides of the ball at every position, and as such, was expected to win handily. Coming into the game, Penn State had sustained injuries two of their top tight ends, Matt Lehman and Kyle Carter. Lehman suffered a knee injury against Syracuse and was out for the season, while Carter was "day-to-day" with an arm injury, but played in the game. The Lions wanted to focus on improving their running game, which was lackluster against Syracuse; Eastern Michigan allowed 202 rushing yards on 5.8 yards per carry in week one. Defensively, linebacker depth was an issue for the Lions. Safety Stephen Obeng-Agyapong was expected to step up and take snaps at linebacker, in addition to speculation he could end up on offense. At half time, the Nittany Lions honored the 1973 Penn State Nittany Lions football team and retired the number of Penn State's only Heisman Trophy winner, number 22 John Cappelletti.

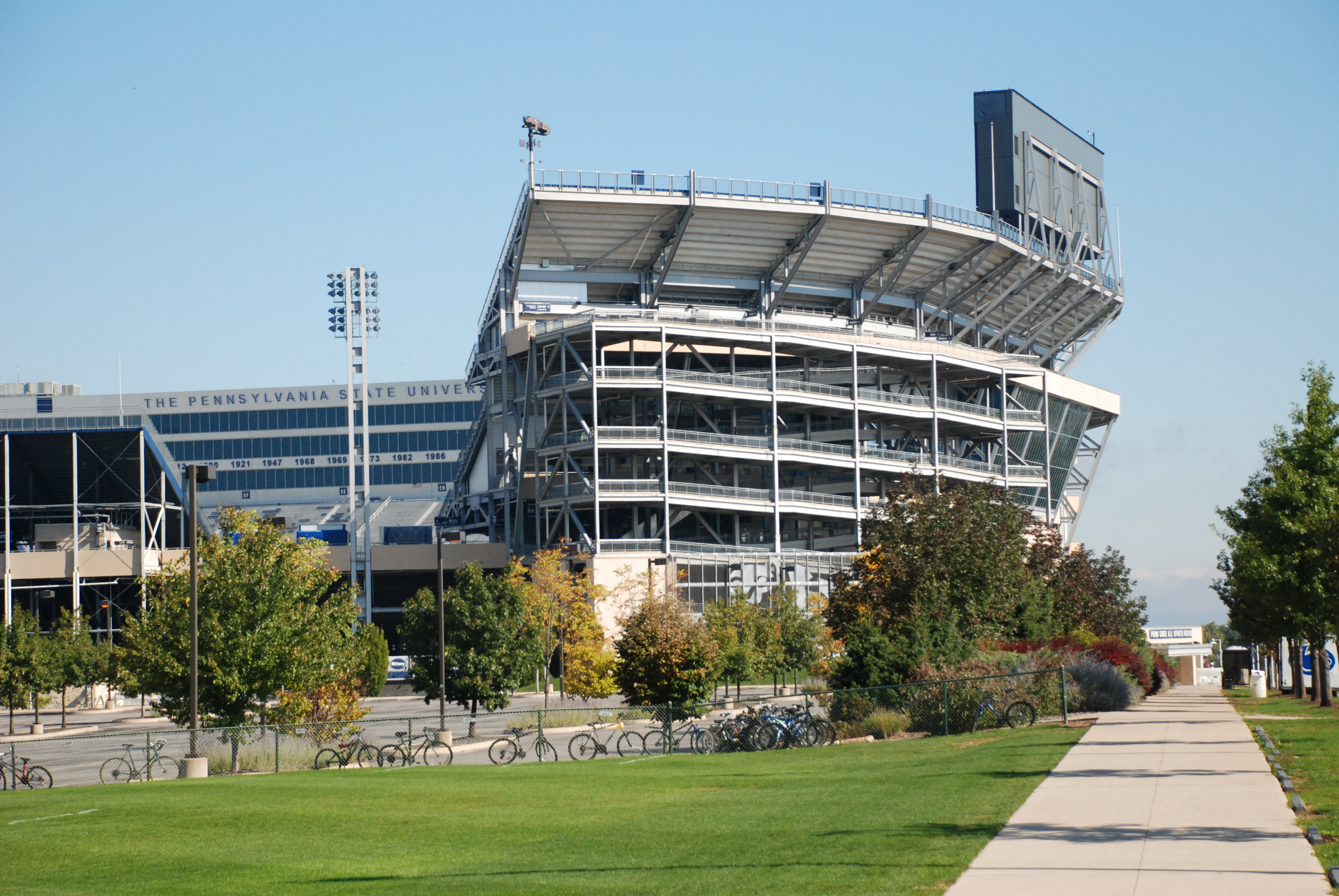
Penn State played all of its home games at Beaver Stadium

After both teams' first drives ended without points, Eastern Michigan got good field position to start their second drive, and attempted a 35-yard field goal, but after a low snap, Penn State defender Jordan Lucas tackled the holder for a loss, and the kick never got off, for a turnover on downs. Penn State failed to capitalize, however, as Hackenberg threw another incomplete pass on third down, starting the game with one completion in five attempts. Eastern Michigan scored first after the ball slipped from Hackenberg's hands and was returned for a touchdown by Hunter Matt for 11 yards, giving Eastern Michigan a 7–0 advantage with 4:01 in the first quarter. Penn State responded on their next drive scoring a touchdown on a 2-yard Zach Zwinak run, capping a 6-play, 67-yard drive that included a 43-yard reception to Allen Robinson to put the ball inside the 10-yard line. Penn State's next drive featured a hurry up offense, which Penn State calls "NASCAR", included 15+ yard completions to Jesse James and Matt Zanellato, and culminated with two consecutive runs by Bill Belton, the latter of which went for a 5-yard touchdown making the score 14–7. Eastern Michigan's ensuing drive had some success, as they got to Penn State 25-yard line prior to kicker Dylan Mulder pushing a 42-yard field goal attempt to the right of the goal posts. At the end of the first half, Penn State got into field goal range with under a minute to go, and Sam Ficken converted a 39-yard field goal, his Penn State record 14th straight, to make the score 17–7 with 17 seconds in the half. Penn State got the ball to start the second half, but exchanged punts with Eastern Michigan for their first three drives, both teams punting the ball away on their first three drives. On their fourth drive of the half, Penn State got to the board – on a six play drive that included a 20-yard run by Zwinak on 3rd and 24 (after two sacks) and a subsequent fourth down conversion, and then culminated with a 7-yard touchdown run by Zwinak making the score 24–7. After a quick punt, Penn State began to grind it out offensively prior to Hackenberg finding Robinson for a 45-yard touchdown pass to make it 31–7. Later in the quarter, Belton broke loose for a 51-yard touchdown run, putting him over 100 rushing yards on the day making the score 38–7. After Eastern Michigan punted for the 10th time in the game, Penn State brought in Tyler Ferguson at quarterback to replace Hackenberg, who had already amassed 311 passing yards, a Penn State single game freshman record. On that drive, Akeel Lynch became the third Nittany Lion to rush for a touchdown, an 18-yard run with under five minutes to go. That would be the final scoring play of the game; Penn State won 45–7.

The Penn State defense struggled with defending the bootleg play early on, but recorded a shut out (the seven points for Eastern Michigan were off an offensive fumble) and limited Eastern Michigan to 183 total yards. They were led by senior defensive tackle DaQuan Jones, who recorded nine tackles and two sacks, Glenn Carson, who recorded 10 tackles, and Nyeem Wartman, who recorded six tackles and three pass deflections. On offense, the "running back by committee" approach proved successful – the two non-starters, Belton and Lynch, each recorded 108 rushing yards. One problem offensively was third down efficiency; the Lions were just 1 of 10 on third downs, bringing them to 2 of 26 on the season. One writer called Jones the game's MVP, noting his statistics, plugging holes opened by the offensive line, and overall "dominance", noting that he "put on an absolute display".

Penn State starting lineup

Offense
Position	Player	Class
LT	Donovan Smith	SO
LG	Miles Dieffenbach	JR
C	Ty Howle	SR
RG	John Urschel	SR
RT	Garry Gilliam	JR
TE	Jesse James	SO
QB	Christian Hackenberg	FR
RB	Zach Zwinak	JR
TE	Adam Breneman	FR
WR	Allen Robinson	JR
WR	Brandon Felder	SR

Defense
Position	Player	Class
DE	C. J. Olaniyan	JR
DT	DaQuan Jones	SR
DT	Kyle Baublitz	JR
DE	Deion Barnes	SO
OLB	Stephen Obeng-Agyapong	SR
MLB	Glenn Carson	SR
OLB	Nyeem Wartman	FR
CB	Trevor Williams (American football)	SO
S	Malcolm Willis	SR
S	Adrian Amos	JR
CB	Jordan Lucas	SO

Special teams
Position	Player	Class
K	Sam Ficken	JR
P	Alex Butterworth	SR

=== September 14 vs. UCF ===
Penn State vs. UCF – Game summary

Quarter	1	2	3	4	Total
UCF	7	14	10	3	34
Penn State	7	3	7	14	31

at Beaver Stadium

- Date: September 14
- Game time: 6:00 p.m. EDT
- Game weather: 65 °F (18 °C), sunny (at kickoff)
- Game attendance: 92,855
- Referee: Alex Kemp
- TV announcers (Big Ten Network): Matt Devlin (play-by-play), Glen Mason (analyst)
- ESPN Box Score

Game information

First quarter

- UCF – Storm Johnson, 4 yard pass from Blake Bortles, Shawn Moffitt XP good, 8:13 (UCF 7–0)
- PSU – Zach Zwinak, 6 yard run, Sam Ficken XP good, 4:26 (TIE 7–7)

Second quarter

- UCF – Storm Johnson, 58 yard run, Moffitt XP good, 13:57 (UCF 14–7)
- UCF – J. J. Worton, 5 yard pass from Bortles, Moffitt XP good, 8:51 (UCF 21–7)
- PSU – Sam Ficken, 47 yard field goal, 3:03 (UCF 21–10)

Third quarter

- UCF – Josh Reese, 25 yard pass from Bortles, Moffitt XP good, 8:46 (UCF 28–10)
- PSU – Zwinak, 9 yard run, Ficken XP good, 7:23 (UCF 28–17)
- UCF – Moffitt, 22 yard field goal, 2:30 (UCF 31–17)

Fourth quarter

- PSU – Zwinak, 1 yard run, Ficken XP good, 13:35 (UCF 31–24)
- UCF – Moffitt, 36 yard field goal, 8:10 (UCF 34–24)
- PSU – Allen Robinson, 5 yard pass from Christian Hackenberg, Ficken XP good, 2:51 (UCF 34–31)

Top passer

- Christian Hackenberg – 21/28, 262 yards, TD

Top rushers

- Zach Zwinak – 21 rushes, 128 yards, 3 TD

Top receiver

- Allen Robinson – 9 receptions, 143 yards, TD

Top defender

- Glenn Carson – 6 tackles
- Jordan Lucas – 6 tackles
- Trevor Williams – 6 tackles
- C.J. Olaniyan – 6 tackles

This was the two teams' first meeting since 2004, and the meeting reunited O'Brien and George O'Leary, under whom O'Brien was a graduate assistant in 1995, his first season coaching. The two squads are also set to meet in Ireland to open the 2014 season. In an article in The Patriot-News, writer Bob Flounders asserted that if the Nittany Lions beat the Knights of UCF, they would be on a fast track to a 5–0 start, which would have been their first since 2008. As this was Penn State's first night game with a particularly young team, keeping emotions in check was a key, as was improving third down efficiency (the Lions were 2-for-26 on the season) good for dead last in the Football Bowl Subdivision (FBS). UCF, who was 2–0 coming into the game, went 10–4 in 2012, and was led by their running back Latavius Murray, who graduated. As such, their top offensive player was quarterback Blake Bortles. Defensively, they had only allowed one scoring play all season. Penn State students organized a "whiteout", in which the entire student section dons white. Outside linebacker Mike Hull returned after missing the prior game against Eastern Michigan.

UCF got the ball to start the game at their nine-yard line after a penalty on the kickoff return, and their junior quarterback Blake Bortles orchestrated an efficient drive in which he converted two third downs and was 6/7 passing for 65 yards and a 4-yard touchdown pass to Storm Johnson. Penn State took over and got two first downs, the latter of which as a fourth down conversion, before a 44-yard pass to Allen Robinson immediately followed by a 6-yard touchdown run by Zach Zwinak to tie the game. Penn State moved the ball on their next drive, but ultimately turned the ball over on downs giving UCF good field position, with which they ran a two play drive culminating with a 58-yard touchdown run by Johnson to make it 14–7 UCF. Penn State's special teams responded with a 44-yard kickoff return by Geno Lewis, but their offense went three-and-out, and though they punted the ball deep into UCF territory, the Knights marched down the field with a strong running game and scored another touchdown to go up 21–7. On Penn State's ensuing drive, Sam Ficken kicked a career-long 47-yard field goal. UCF got some decent yardage on their next drive, but Bortles threw his first interception since October 27, 2012, with 1:17 in the half, but they ran down the clock and Ficken missed his first field goal attempt of the season, a 57-yard try as time expired. At the half, UCF had 290 total yards including 170 rushing yards, compared to 220 total yards for Penn State with only 89 rushing yards. Penn State got the ball to start the second half, but punted on their first drive. UCF responded with a touchdown via a 25-yard pass. Penn State came right back with a touchdown of their own. UCF's ensuing drive brought them to the one yard line, but Penn State held them to a field goal, making the score 31–17. Zwinak rushed for his third touchdown of the game on Penn State's next drive, and Shawn Moffitt kicked his second field goal of the game. Penn State drove 51 yards on their next drive before Zwinak lost a fumble with 5:43 remaining in the game. UCF went three-and-out, and on their punt, the snap went over the punter's head, and Penn State got the ball at the UCF 25. Penn State took advantage, scoring on a 5-yard touchdown pass to Allen Robinson with 57 seconds left. Penn State needed to regain possession of the ball after the score, and failed to do so, so ultimately UCF held on to win by three.

Penn State's defense had excelled in their first two games, but regressed significantly against Central Florida, particularly with poor tackling, which some attributed to their practice strategy of "thud" tackling, in which one does not actually take a player to the ground, instead making a "thud" to stop a player. Several media outlets speculated that the Lions used this due to their lack of scholarship players in the wake of sanctions imposed due to the Penn State child sex abuse scandal. Defensive coordinator John Butler renounced that assertion, commenting he employed "thud" when he coached at South Carolina. Penn State's linebackers were also criticized; Glenn Carson and Nyeem Wartman received criticism for not being as strong as the 2012 team's Michael Mauti and Gerald Hodges. In addition, 2012 Big Ten Freshman of the Year defensive end Deion Barnes "barely wreaked any havoc", and DaQuan Jones, whose strong play had previously compensated for Barnes' weak play, was held to just five tackles. The offense, however, was considered a "bright spot"; they gained 455 total yards, though receiver Allen Robinson commented that a fast start would have helped them gain more early momentum: "We are in the Big Ten playing against some great offenses and people are going to put points up early, so we need to get going early and start off fast." Freshman quarterback Christian Hackenberg earned Big Ten Freshman of the Week accolades for the second time in the first three weeks of the season.

Penn State starting lineup

Offense
Position	Player	Class
LT	Donovan Smith	SO
LG	Miles Dieffenbach	JR
C	Ty Howle	SR
RG	John Urschel	SR
RT	Adam Gress	SR
TE	Jesse James	SO
QB	Christian Hackenberg	FR
RB	Zach Zwinak	JR
WR	Geno Lewis	FR
WR	Allen Robinson	JR
WR	Richy Anderson	FR

Defense
Position	Player	Class
DE	C. J. Olaniyan	JR
DT	DaQuan Jones	SR
DT	Kyle Baublitz	JR
DE	Deion Barnes	SO
OLB	Stephen Obeng-Agyapong	SR
MLB	Glenn Carson	SR
OLB	Nyeem Wartman	FR
CB	Trevor Williams (American football)	SO
S	Malcolm Willis	SR
S	Adrian Amos	JR
CB	Jordan Lucas	SO

Special teams
Position	Player	Class
K	Sam Ficken	JR
P	Alex Butterworth	SR

=== September 21 vs. Kent State ===
Penn State vs. Kent State – Game summary

Quarter	1	2	3	4	Total
Kent State	0	0	0	0	0
Penn State	7	7	7	13	34

at Beaver Stadium

- Date: September 21
- Game time: 3:30 p.m. EDT
- Game weather: 64 °F (18 °C), intermittent rain, ranging from drizzle to heavy
- Game attendance: 92,371
- Referee: Dan Capron
- TV announcers (Big Ten Network): Kevin Kugler (play-by-play), Chuck Long (analyst)
- ESPN Box Score

Game information

First quarter

- PSU – Bill Belton, 15 yard pass from Christian Hackenberg, Sam Ficken XP good, 0:09 (PSU 7–0)

Second quarter

- PSU – Zach Zwinak, 2 yard run, Ficken XP good, 9:26 (PSU 14–0)

Third quarter

- PSU – Zach Zwinak, 1 yard run, Ficken XP good, 4:53 (PSU 21–0)

Fourth quarter

- PSU – Sam Ficken, 25 yard field goal, 13:12 (PSU 24–0)
- PSU – Zach Zwinak, 1 yard run, Ficken XP good, 6:42 (PSU 31–0)
- PSU – Sam Ficken, 54 yard field goal, 2:45 (PSU 34–0)

Top passer

- Christian Hackenberg – 13/35, 176 yards, TD, INT

Top rushers

- Akeel Lynch – 14 rushes, 123 yards
- Zach Zwinak – 15 rushes, 65 yards, 3 TD

Top receiver

- Allen Robinson – 3 receptions, 43 yards

Top defender

- Glenn Carson – 7 tackles

Penn State came into the game 2–1, while the Kent State Golden Flashes entered 1–2, including 0–1 in conference play, though this was a non-conference matchup. Kent State was expected to be without their star offensive weapon, wide receiver and running back Dri Archer, who suffered lingering effects from an ankle injury sustained in week one. In 2012, Archer rushed for 1,429 yards and scored 16 touchdowns, led the Golden Flashes in receptions and receiving yards, and recorded three kickoff returns for touchdowns; he even received some Heisman hype (he did not win). Without Archer, Kent State would have to more heavily rely on their freshman quarterback Colin Reardon, who had "not exactly dazzled" in Kent State's first three games, but had yet to throw an interception. Picking up the slack in the running game was Trayvion Durham, who had a total of 152 rushing yards in their first three games. The game also featured two top sophomore defensive ends – NFL prospects Roosevelt Nix for Kent State and Deion Barnes for Penn State, neither of whom had gotten off to a particularly strong start to the season, but both of whom had won their conference's freshman of the year award in 2012. Penn State also looked to rebound from sloppy tackling the previous week against UCF that underscored an overall poor defensive performance. Offensively for Penn State, a quarter of the way through the season, one ESPN writer projected Allen Robinson to win the Big Ten Offensive Player of the Year award, and Christian Hackenberg to win the Big Ten Freshman of the Year award for their strong performances through the first three games. That duo along with the running back trio of Zach Zwinak, Bill Belton, and Akeel Lynch led Penn State's offense, which was coming off a performance in which they had scored 31 points, into the game.

In heavy rain that announcer Kevin Kugler described as a "deluge", Penn State's Blue Band wore ponchos in the stands during a "blue out", to support the Pennsylvania Coalition Against Rape. After Penn State went three-and-out to start the game, Kent State got excellent field position at the opposition's 36-yard line after Penn State committed kick catching interference on the punt, but failed to capitalize as their kicker, Anthony Melchiori, missed a 31-yard field goal. Penn State's next drive stalled, and on fourth down, quarterback Christian Hackenberg executed a "pooch punt", in which the quarterback lines up in the shotgun formation, and punts the ball, for 44-yards pinning Kent State inside their 10-yard line. Penn State drove down the field late in the first quarter getting it to the five-yard line, when Hackenberg had the ball slip from his hand backing Penn State up to the 15-yard line, but on the subsequent play, Hackenberg completed a 15-yard pass to Bill Belton for a touchdown to culminate a 9-play, 87-yard drive encapsulating 3:39. Kent State's offense again proved ineffective, and Penn State's proved strong, as they drove down the field on a 10-play, 82-yard drive ending with Zach Zwinak running for a 2-yard touchdown. Towards the end of the first half, the teams began to exchange punts, and the half ended with Penn State ahead 14–0. In the third quarter, Hackenberg threw an interception, but on the next drive, Kent State threw an interception and Penn State got the ball back. Later in the quarter, Penn State ran a 51-yard drive that got them inside the ten-yard line down to the one, at which point Zwinak ran for a touchdown, his second of the game. Later in the quarter, Penn State began another drive that spilled into the fourth quarter on which Akeel Lynch was the primary running back for the Lions, running for a total of 78 yards en route to Sam Ficken booting his first field goal of the game, a 25-yarder. In the middle of the fourth quarter, Penn State embarked on a drive that milked over five-and-a-half minutes off the clock and culminated with Zwinak rushing for his third touchdown of the game, a one-yard score with 6:42 to play. After another lackluster drive by Kent State, they punted for the ninth time, and on Penn State's ensuing drive, Tyler Ferguson entered at quarterback, and Von Walker, a member of Penn State's "run-on" program, entered at running back, and on the drive, Ficken kicked a personal record 54-yard field goal, the longest by a Penn State player since 1979, which was the final scoring play of the game, whose final score was 34–0.

Penn State's defense excelled, shutting out an opponent for the first time since the 2010 season, also against Kent State. The Lions held Kent State to 190 total yards – just 56 rushing yards, and allowed them to move into Penn State territory only twice out of 14 drives. In the post game media conference, Coach Bill O'Brien commended his defensive coordinator John Butler for his hard work in practice the previous week to rebound from an embarrassing performance against Central Florida. Defensive end Deion Barnes recorded his first sack of the season, and safety Ryan Keiser made his first career interception, while linebacker Glenn Carson led the team with seven tackles. Offensively, Penn State was led by their tandem at running back – trio Zach Zwinak, who had three touchdown rushes, excelling in the grind-it-out style of play Penn State employed in the rain, Bill Belton rushed for 90 yards on 13 carries and had a receiving touchdown, and Akeel Lynch had a "career day", rushing for 123 yards on just 14 carries. The passing game faltered in the rainy conditions, as Christian Hackenberg frequently forced the ball to Allen Robinson for incomplete passes – Robinson finished with 3 receptions, and Hackenberg with 22 incomplete passes and an interception. Penn State did improve on third downs, converting 7-of-18, but remained in the bottom of the FBS, 120 out of 123 teams.

Penn State starting lineup

Offense

Position	Player	Class
LT	Donovan Smith	SO
LG	Miles Dieffenbach	JR
C	Ty Howle	SR
RG	John Urschel	SR
RT	Adam Gress	SR
TE	Jesse James	SO
QB	Christian Hackenberg	FR
RB	Zach Zwinak	JR
TE	Kyle Carter	SO
WR	Allen Robinson	JR
WR	Brandon Felder	SR

Defense

Position	Player	Class
DE	C. J. Olaniyan	JR
DT	DaQuan Jones	SR
DT	Austin Johnson	FR
DE	Deion Barnes	SO
OLB	Stephen Obeng-Agyapong	SR
MLB	Glenn Carson	SR
OLB	Nyeem Wartman	FR
CB	Trevor Williams (American football)	SO
S	Malcolm Willis	SR
S	Adrian Amos	JR
CB	Jordan Lucas	SO

Special teams

Position	Player	Class
K	Sam Ficken	JR
P	Alex Butterworth	SR

=== Bye week #1 – September 28, 2013 ===
After their first four non-conference games, Penn State had their first of two mid-season bye weeks, this one heading into conference play. Off the field, Penn State received relief from sanctions imposed in wake of the Penn State child sex abuse scandal; based on a recommendation from independent integrity monitor George Mitchell, Penn State was allowed to have five additional scholarships in 2014, and up to the full 25 by 2015, meaning they would have the full 85 by the 2016 season.

“The decision is the result of a thoughtful and deliberative process to ensure we reached the most appropriate outcome. During our discussions, we had the benefit of engaging with Senator Mitchell’s expert perspective and the views of our Big Ten colleagues.” – Rita Hartung Cheng, chair of the NCAA executive committee meetings regarding Mitchell's annual report

The reduction of penalties led to an article in The Patriot News on whether Penn State achieved an "unequivocal" bye week victory, perhaps even their biggest victory of the season.

On the field, several keys for improvement were identified within the media, including finding a secondary receiver to Allen Robinson, strengthening the secondary, and continuing improvement on third downs. Also, Penn State's tight end tandem, which struggled during non-conference play, needed to improve, particularly as Penn State had a young quarterback in Christian Hackenberg who would face tougher defenses in conference play.

=== October 5 vs. Indiana ===
Penn State vs. Indiana – Game summary

Quarter	1	2	3	4	Total
Penn State	0	7	10	7	24
Indiana	7	6	8	23	44

at Memorial Stadium, Bloomington, Indiana

- Date: October 5
- Game time: 12:00 p.m. EDT
- Game weather: 71 °F (22 °C), light rain
- Game attendance: 42,125
- Referee: John O'Neill
- TV announcers (Big Ten Network): Matt Devlin (play-by-play), Glen Mason (analyst), Jon Jansen (sideline)
- ESPN Box Score, CSTV Game Book

Game information

First quarter

- IND – Isaiah Roundtree, 5 yard pass from Nate Sudfeld, Mitch Ewald XP good, 3:05 (IND 7–0)

Second quarter

- PSU – Allen Robinson, 46 yard pass from Christian Hackenberg, Sam Ficken XP good, 9:16 (TIE 7–7)
- IND – Ewald, 24 yard field goal, 6:43 (IND 10–7)
- IND – Ewald, 27 yard field goal, 0:00 (IND 13–7)

Third quarter

- PSU – Robinson, 26 yard pass from Hackenberg, Ficken XP good, 9:18 (PSU 14–13)
- IND – Tevin Coleman, 44 yard run, Tre Roberson run for two-point conversion good, 7:56 (IND 21–14)
- PSU – Ficken, 30 yard field goal, 2:04 (IND 21–17)

Fourth quarter

- IND – Roberson, 2 yard run, Ewald XP good, 14:10 (IND 28–17)
- IND – Kofi Hughes, 36 yard pass from Sudfeld, Ewald XP good, 10:42 (IND 35–17)
- IND – Roberson, 9 yard run, Ewald XP good, 10:30 (IND 42–17)
- PSU – Bill Belton, 14 yard pass from Hackenberg, Ficken XP good, 7:44 (IND 42–24)
- IND – Donovan Smith tackled in end zone by Nick Mangieri; safety, 5:40 (IND 44–24)

Top passer

- Christian Hackenberg – 30/55, 340 yards, 3 TD

Top rushers

- Zach Zwinak – 17 rushes, 72 yards

Top receiver

- Allen Robinson – 12 receptions, 173 yards, 2 TD

Top defender

- Glenn Carson – 10 tackles (9 solo)
- Mike Hull – 10 tackles (6 solo), 0.5 sacks

In their second game away from Beaver Stadium of the season, the Nittany Lions traveled to Bloomington, Indiana for their game against the Indiana Hoosiers, their first conference opponent. This was the teams' 17th meeting, with Penn State owning a 16–0 record coming into the game. Indiana featured the Big Ten's best passing offense in 2012, led by quarterback Chase Coffman, who returned in 2013. Indiana entered the game with a record of 2–2. As they had in 2012, struggled defensively in their first four games, averaging giving up nearly 33 points per game. Their offense however, had shined thus far, and had come into their previous game, a 45–28 loss to Missouri, averaging 50 points per game, but sputtered against the Tigers. A preview on SB Nation noted that Indiana's pass first offense might "cause problems" for Penn State, though it expressed some optimism, as Mike Hull finally returned and Adrian Amos moved from safety to cornerback. Offensively for Penn State, balancing the running game with the passing game was a key – in the previous season's game against Indiana, Penn Statewide receiver Allen Robinson caught 10 passes for 197 yards and 3 touchdowns – as this was expected to be a developmental game for freshman quarterback Christian Hackenberg. There was no conclusive advantage on special teams.

Penn State got the ball to start the game, and drove down the field with relative ease (facing only one third down) prior to stalling at their 26-yard line and turning the ball over on downs. After an Indiana three and out, Penn State ran another drive at the end of which they turned over on downs. Each team ran one more drive before Indiana attained first downs on three consecutive plays, ultimately culminating their possession with a five-yard touchdown pass from quarterback Nate Sudfeld to Isaiah Roundtree, making the score 7–0 at the end of the first quarter. Penn State responded on their second drive of the second quarter via a 46-yard pass from Hackenberg to Robinson to tie the game. Later, Mitch Ewald kicked a short field goal to re-take the lead. Penn State had a chance to tie the game again when kicker Sam Ficken attempted a 42-yard field goal, but Indiana blocked the kick, and with their ensuing momentum drove down the field at the end of the half, ultimately ending with Ewald hitting a field goal as time expired. After halftime, Indiana ran a quick drive on which they punted before Penn State ran a 13-play, 80-yard drive that concluded with Robinson catching his second touchdown of the game, a 26-yard pass from Hackenberg. Indiana responded with a quick score; they converted a two-point conversion to take a 21–14 lead. Late in the third quarter, Hackenberg threw a fade pattern to Robinson in the corner of the end zone, which Robinson corralled, but he landed on his back out of bounds, and came up either with the wind knocked out, or some sort of back injury. Penn State settled for a field goal, and at the end of three, Indiana led 21–17. The fourth quarter entrenched the Hoosiers' lead, as they totaled 23 points to only 7 for Penn State, winning the game 44–24, their final score coming on a safety.

Dubbed the "low point ... of the Bill O'Brien era" and Penn State's first ever loss to the Hoosiers, lack of execution was a primary problem for the Nittany Lions; Penn State was just one-of-five on fourth down conversion attempts, a few of which they attempted while in Sam Ficken's field goal range, and on two field goal attempts, there were two botched snaps, the first of which led to a blocked kick, the latter getting past the holder and rolling 31 yards by the time Ficken fell on the ball for a turnover on downs. O'Brien also conceded that poor coaching did not help the Lions, and that he tried to "manufacture" momentum at several points in the game: "We coached very average today." − Bill O'Brien

Penn State starting lineup

Offense
Position	Player	Class
LT	Donovan Smith	SO
LG	Miles Dieffenbach	JR
C	Ty Howle	SR
RG	John Urschel	SR
RT	Adam Gress	SR
TE	Jesse James	SO
QB	Christian Hackenberg	FR
RB	Zach Zwinak	JR
WR	Geno Lewis	FR
WR	Allen Robinson	JR
WR	Richy Anderson	FR

Defense

Position	Player	Class
DE	C. J. Olaniyan	JR
DT	DaQuan Jones	SR
DT	Kyle Baublitz	JR
DE	Deion Barnes	SO
OLB	Stephen Obeng-Agyapong	SR
MLB	Glenn Carson	SR
OLB	Mike Hull	JR
CB	Trevor Williams (American football)	SO
S	Malcolm Willis	SR
S	Adrian Amos	JR
CB	Jordan Lucas	SO

Special teams

Position	Player	Class
K	Sam Ficken	JR
P	Alex Butterworth	SR

=== October 12 vs. Michigan ===
Michigan vs. Penn State – Game summary

Quarter	1	2	3	4	OT	2OT	3OT	4OT	Total
#18 Michigan	10	0	17	7	0	3	0	3	40
Penn State	7	14	3	10	0	3	0	6	43

at Beaver Stadium

- Date: October 12
- Game time: 5:00 p.m. EDT
- Game weather: 54 °F (12 °C), partly cloudy
- Game attendance: 107,884 (sellout)
- Referee: Todd Geerlings
- TV announcers (ESPN): Joe Tessitore (play-by-play), Matt Millen (analyst), Maria Taylor (sideline)
- ESPN Box Score

Game information

First quarter

- PSU – Brandon Felder, 12 yard pass from Christian Hackenberg, Sam Ficken XP good, 9:39 (PSU 7–0)
- MICH – Devin Funchess, 59 yard pass from Devin Gardner, Brendan Gibbons XP good, 8:19 (TIE 7–7)
- MICH – Gibbons, 47 yard field goal, 0:49 (MICH 10–7)

Second quarter

- PSU – Jesse James, 20 yard pass from Hackenberg, Ficken XP good, 11:27 (PSU 14–10)
- PSU – Felder, 24 yard pass from Hackenberg, Ficken XP good, 7:06 (PSU 21–10)

Third quarter

- MICH – Zach Zwinak fumble forced by Brennen Beyer, recovered by Frank Clark and returned 25 yards for a touchdown, Gibbons XP good, 14:50 (PSU 21–17)
- MICH – Gibbons, 23 yard field goal, 8:50 (PSU 21–20)
- PSU – Ficken, 45 yard field goal, 4:21 (PSU 24–20)
- MICH – Jeremy Gallon, 16 yard touchdown pass from Gardner, Gibbons XP good, 0:28 (MICH 27–24)

Fourth quarter

- MICH – Funchess, 37 yard pass from Gardner, Gibbons XP good, 10:28 (MICH 34–24)
- PSU – Ficken, 43 yard field goal, 6:35 (MICH 34–27)
- PSU – Hackenberg, 1 yard run, Ficken XP good, 0:27 (TIE 34–34)

First overtime

- No scoring

Second overtime

- MICH – Gibbons, 25 yard field goal (MICH 37–34)
- PSU – Ficken, 36 yard field goal (TIE 37–37)

Third overtime

- No scoring

Fourth overtime

- MICH – Gibbons, 40 yard field goal (MICH 40–37)
- PSU – Bill Belton, 2 yard run (PSU 43–40)

Top passer

- Christian Hackenberg – 23/44, 304 yards, 3 TD, 2 INT

Top rusher

- Bill Belton – 27 rushes, 86 yards, TD

Top receiver

- Brandon Felder – 6 receptions, 96 yards, 2 TD

Top defenders

- Glenn Carson – 10 tackles, sack
- Mike Hull – 10 tackles
- C. J. Olaniyan – 8 tackles, 3 sack

In the teams' first meeting since the 2010 season, the Nittany Lions looked to achieve their fourth consecutive win in the series, however even a hometown paper, the York Daily Record, predicted the Lions would lose, albeit in a close game, citing Michigan's superiority on both offense and defense, as well as coaching, compared to Penn State's superiority on special teams and intangibles.

"Coming off a loss like (Indiana) is just going to motivate us harder. I see more focus in our team after losses ... gets us to work harder in practice, in the film room in order to get a win because we're hungry. We're just more determined – we're hungry for a win. We really want it. We really need it. ... The best way to get over that loss, that feeling of a loss, is to win a game. So we're really searching for this one."

— Glenn Carson, Penn State senior middle linebacker, October 11, 2013

Penn State's edition of SB Nation also predicted the Lions would lose citing the Wolverines' better athletes, but noted that Michigan's quarterback Devin Gardner has thrown as many interceptions as touchdowns (8) coming into the game, and that Penn State's best chance to win would be if Michigan turned the ball over frequently. Coming off an embarrassing loss against Indiana, Penn State's coach Bill O'Brien was "focused" all week and refused to talk to the media about the prior week's loss, focusing strictly on the Michigan game, which was Homecoming for Penn State, was expected to be the first sellout of the season, and featured a whiteout, led by the student section. O'Brien noted, "it would be crazy to think this is just another game". The game was Penn State's second national broadcast of the year, with Penn State alumnus Matt Millen providing color commentary on Penn State's homecoming weekend. Michigan, coming off a 42–13 victory over Minnesota, entered the game with a win–loss record of 5–0, one of two remaining undefeated teams in the Big Ten (the other was Ohio State, who was 6–0, and whom the Lions are scheduled to play on October 26). Michigan's defense, led by their star cornerback Blake Countless, who was tied for the NCAA lead with four interceptions entering the game, had yet to allow a rushing touchdown, and was expected to receive a boost from the return of their 2012 All-Big Ten linebacker Jake Ryan, who tore his anterior cruciate ligament (ACL) the prior season. As such, a key for Penn State was to match Michigan's physicality in strong offensive line play and establish the line of scrimmage, both on offense and defense, as the game would be won in the trenches. The game was described as a "critical juncture". Before the game, Penn State realized that, due to a Ticketmaster glitch, it had oversold student section tickets, and was forced to offer several alternate packages in order not to have to boot students.

With a Goodyear blimp overhead, Michigan got the ball to start the game, and on their first play from scrimmage, they lost three yards when DaQuan Jones made a tackle for a loss stopping Fitzgerald Toussaint; the loss decimated the drive, which ended in a three-and-out. Penn State's drive was no more successful – after one first down, Christian Hackenberg threw an interception. On Michigan's ensuing drive, however, they were set up on another third down and long, and Penn State's Jordan Lucas picked off Michigan quarterback Devin Gardner's pass, setting Penn State up in the red zone. Penn State capitalized, as Hackenberg threw a 12-yard touchdown pass to senior receiver Brandon Felder. Michigan struck right back, getting two first downs in the running game prior to Gardner throwing a 59-yard touchdown pass to Devin Funchess to tie the game. Penn State did not get a first down on their next drive and tried to convert fourth down deep in their own territory, but failed, setting Michigan up with excellent field position. Penn State's defense, however, responded, with Glenn Carson sacking Gardner to put Michigan out of field goal range, forcing a punt that Michigan downed around the five yard line. On Michigan's next drive, their kicker Brendan Gibbons made a 47-yard field goal. After Penn State again punted, Michigan embarked on a drive that included a third-and-long conversion, but ultimately ended when Gardner threw an interception to Penn State defensive end Anthony Zettel, who started over Deion Barnes. It took Penn State only one play to capitalize; Hackenberg threw a 20-yard touchdown pass to Jesse James to put Penn State back up 14–10. Penn State struck again later in the quarter, again via a touchdown pass from Hackenberg to Felder. Late in the first half, Penn State defensive end C. J. Olaniyan sacked Gardner for the second time, forcing a fumble, which Penn State recovered, but their drive stalled, and they punted. Penn State held a 21–10 advantage at halftime.

On Penn State's first play from scrimmage in the second half, Zach Zwinak fumbled, and it was returned for a touchdown by Frank Clark to pull within four points. After another Penn State drive stalled, Michigan drove down the field, and was faced with a third-and-short before a freshman offensive lineman committed a dead ball unsportsmanlike conduct penalty to back up Michigan to face a third and long; on that play Olaniyan recorded his third sack of the day, and Michigan punted. On Penn State's ensuing drive, they turned the ball over again, this time via a Hackenberg interception; Michigan capitalized by kicking a field goal. When Penn State got the ball back, they ran a sustained, balanced drive (4 run plays, 5 pass plays, 50 yards) down the field during which they went to Bill Belton in the running game (as Zwinak had fumbled previously in the half) that culminated with Sam Ficken kicking a 45-yard field goal to go up by 4 points. Michigan promptly drove right back down the field, and Gardner threw a touchdown pass to Jeremy Gallon to take the lead for the second time, 27–24. In the fourth quarter, Ficken attempted a 47-yard field goal, but missed, and Penn State's 10-play 45-yard drive came up empty. Michigan took advantage of their ensuing field position and ran a quick drive that ended with a 37-yard touchdown pass from Gardner to Funchess, putting them on top by 10 with 10:28 to go. On Penn State's ensuing drive, they converted a fourth down and one near midfield prior to a penalty and then a sack setting up a third and long on which Hackenberg threw an incomplete pass, so they were forced to settle with pulling within 7; Sam Ficken kicked a 43-yard field goal. Michigan tried to run out the clock on their next drive, and Penn State burned all three of their timeouts. Though they were at one point within field goal range, they committed a five-yard delay of game penalty that pushed them out of range, and they had to punt. Penn State got the ball with 50 seconds left and no timeouts at their own 20-yard line. Needing a touchdown to tie the game, Penn State's first play of scrimmage was a pass from Hackenberg to Robinson along the sideline that was ruled incomplete on the field, but was reviewed and overturned and counted as a 14-yard gain. The next play was an acrobatic catch by Felder for 29 yards, and then a pass down the sideline to Robinson for 36 yards to put the ball inside the one yard line with 29 seconds remaining. Michigan then called their final timeout. Hackenberg then attempted a quarterback sneak over the right side for a touchdown; the play was reviewed and the call was confirmed, and Ficken made the extra point to tie the game with 27 seconds left. Michigan took the ball at their own 35, drove it to the other 35, and lined Gibbons up to attempt a 52-yard field goal, which he missed short. Penn State got the ball with two seconds left, but downed the ball to send the game into overtime.

Penn State got the ball to start overtime, but went three-and-out and Ficken missed a field goal. Michigan used their entire possession to try to center the ball for Gibbons, and then they attempted a field goal, but it was blocked, to send the game into a second overtime. Michigan got the ball to start the second overtime, achieved one first down, and Gibbons redeemed himself, kicking a 25-yard field goal. Ficken responded, tacking on a 36-yard field goal to tie the game at 37, headed into a third overtime. Penn State got the ball to start the third overtime, but on their first play, an end-around to Robinson that he fumbled and was recovered by Clark to set up Michigan with a chance to win the game with any score. Gibbons had an opportunity to win the game, but missed wide, and sent the game into a fourth overtime. Michigan got the ball to start the fourth overtime, and stalled, leaving Gibbons to attempt a 40-yard field goal, which he made to put the Wolverines on top 40–37. Penn State then needed a field goal to tie, or a touchdown to win. Faced with a fourth down and one, O'Brien sent his team out on the field to go for it, and they converted via a two-yard run by Belton. Three plays later, Hackenberg threw an incomplete pass intended for Robinson in the end zone, but officials called pass interference on the play, which occurred in the end zone, resulting in the ball being placed at the two yard line. On Penn State's next play, Hackenberg handed the ball off to Belton, who ran it in for a two-yard touchdown, winning the game for Penn State.

The four-overtime game was the longest in Big Ten Conference history. For their performance in the game, Athlon Sports named Hackenberg as both its Big Ten and National Freshman of the Week, and Olaniyan as its Big Ten Defensive Player of the Week. Hackenberg threw for over 300 yards for the third time, already moving him into a tie for third-most all time in Penn State history, tied with Daryll Clark, and behind Matt McGloin and Kerry Collins; it was the third time he had been named freshman of the week. Olaniyan recorded 2.5 sacks and forced a fumble (that was recovered by DaQuan Jones), and this was his first career Big Ten Player of the Week accolade. ESPN named the game the best of the season's first half, and Robinson's catch late in regulation was named the number-one play on Sports Center's Top Ten.

Penn State starting lineup

Offense
Position	Player	Class
LT	Donovan Smith	SO
LG	Miles Dieffenbach	JR
C	Ty Howle	SR
RG	John Urschel	SR
RT	Garry Gilliam	JR
TE	Jesse James	SO
QB	Christian Hackenberg	FR
RB	Zach Zwinak	JR
TE	Kyle Carter	SO
WR	Allen Robinson	JR
WR	Brandon Felder	SR

Defense
Position	Player	Class
DE	C. J. Olaniyan	JR
DT	DaQuan Jones	SR
DT	Kyle Baublitz	JR
DE	Anthony Zettel	SO
OLB	Mike Hull	JR
MLB	Glenn Carson	SR
OLB	Nyeem Wartman	FR
CB	Trevor Williams (American football)	SO
S	Ryan Keiser	JR
S	Adrian Amos	JR
CB	Jordan Lucas	SO

Special teams
Position	Player	Class
K	Sam Ficken	JR
P	Alex Butterworth	SR

=== Bye week #2 – October 19, 2013 ===
After Penn State's quadruple overtime win against Michigan, they tried to get healthy, with veterans being held out of a scrimmage that occurred during the week of practice, instead working on conditioning. One ESPN writer opined that defensive coordinator John Butler needed to emphasize reworking the secondary, similar to how he had focused on reworking the defensive line, which was successful during the prior week's game. Also, Penn State needed to find additional "playmakers" to supplement Allen Robinson in the receiving game, as well as determine who would lead the running game, as Zach Zwinak had fumbled against Michigan and was taken out, and Bill Belton took over and performed well. Halfway through the season, ESPN.com rated Robinson as the team's offensive MVP, and defensive tackle DaQuan Jones as the team's defensive MVP. The midseason report noted that Penn State had a grueling schedule in the second half of the season that would test the depth of its defense, limited by lack of scholarship players. Lancaster Newspapers concurred with ESPN, awarding their first half offensive and defensive MVPs to Robinson and Jones respectively as well, adding Sam Ficken as special teams MVP. The column also called sophomore defensive end Deion Barnes the biggest disappointment of the first half, noting that he had even been relegated out of the starting lineup. Quarterback Christian Hackenberg, who had started the first six games and had a "halftime" in the bye week, as there were still six games to play, viewed the bye week as a bonus: "We have a couple more days to prepare, get a good game plan and get ready to go to a hostile environment and play a really good football team. I think it's more of a bonus for us." Coach Bill O'Brien concurred, asserting that Penn State's win against Michigan gave Hackenberg confidence and development.

=== October 26 vs. Ohio State ===
Penn State vs. Ohio State – Game summary

Quarter	1	2	3	4	Total
Penn State	0	7	0	7	14
#4 Ohio State	14	28	14	7	63

at The Horseshoe

- Date: October 26
- Game time: 8:00 p.m. EDT
- Game weather: 45 °F (7 °C), mostly cloudy
- Game attendance: 105,889
- Referee: Dave Witvoet
- TV announcers (ABC): Brad Nessler (play-by-play), Todd Blackledge (analyst), Holly Rowe (sideline)
- ESPN Box Score

Game information

First quarter

- OSU – Carlos Hyde, 2 yard run, Drew Basil XP good, 12:43 (OSU 7–0)
- OSU – Braxton Miller, 39 yard run, Basil XP good, 1:10 (OSU 14–0)

Second quarter

- OSU – Miller, 6 yard run, Basil XP good, 13:00 (OSU 21–0)
- OSU – Chris Fields, 3 yard pass from Miller, Basil XP good, 8:24 (OSU 28–0)
- PSU – Brandon Felder, 12 yard pass from Christian Hackenberg, Sam Ficken XP good, 4:12 (OSU 28–7)
- OSU – Hyde, 39 yard run, Basil XP good, 3:16 (OSU 35–7)
- OSU – Philly Brown, 25 yard pass from Miller, Basil XP good, 0:03 (OSU 42–7)

Third quarter

- OSU – Dontre Wilson, 26 yard pass from Miller, Basil XP good, 8:52 (OSU 49–7)
- OSU – Kenny Gution, 2 yard run, Basil XP good, 4:01 (OSU 56–7)

Fourth quarter

- OSU – Guiton, 11 yard run, Basil XP good, 8:24 (OSU 63–7)
- PSU – Allen Robinson, 65 yard pass from Tyler Ferguson, Ficken XP good, 7:33 (OSU 63–14)

Top passer

- Tyler Ferguson – 7/11, 125 yards, TD

Top rusher

- Bill Belton – 22 rushes, 98 yards

Top receiver

- Allen Robinson – 12 receptions, 173 yards, TD

Top defender

- Jordan Lucas – 11 tackles

In Penn State's second nationally televised, prime time game, which was to be called by Nittany Lion alumnus Todd Blackledge, the Lions entered the game underdogs, even according to their local media. The opening line put Ohio State 14.5 point favorites. Pre-game buildup focused on Ohio State quarterback Braxton Miller, for whom there "is no good way to stop", and who Bill O'Brien called one of the top five players in the country. In tandem with star running back Carlos Hyde, Ohio State was expected to score a lot of points, even against Penn State's improved defense; a preview from York Daily Record writer Frank Bodani gave Ohio State the edge on offense, citing the tandem of Miller and Hyde, defense, citing playmaking game-changers Noah Spence and Ryan Shazier, who play defensive end and linebacker respectively, special teams, noting their punt blocking ability and return game, coaching, noting that Ohio State had not yet lost under Urban Meyer, and intangibles, citing the sold-out crowd in prime time. Keys to the game for Penn State were to contain Miller, not get beaten over-the-top in coverage, and running the ball, so as to avoid becoming one-dimensional offensively. Ohio State needed to contain Penn State receiver Allen Robinson with their star cornerback Bradley Roby, "ride Hyde" (run the ball with Carlos Hyde), and get pressure on freshman quarterback Christian Hackenberg. Penn State made a few changes on their depth chart for the game, including placing Bill Belton and Zach Zwinak on the first team separated with an "OR". Also, Deion Barnes and Anthony Zettel were listed with an OR between their names; Zettel started the previous week against Michigan.

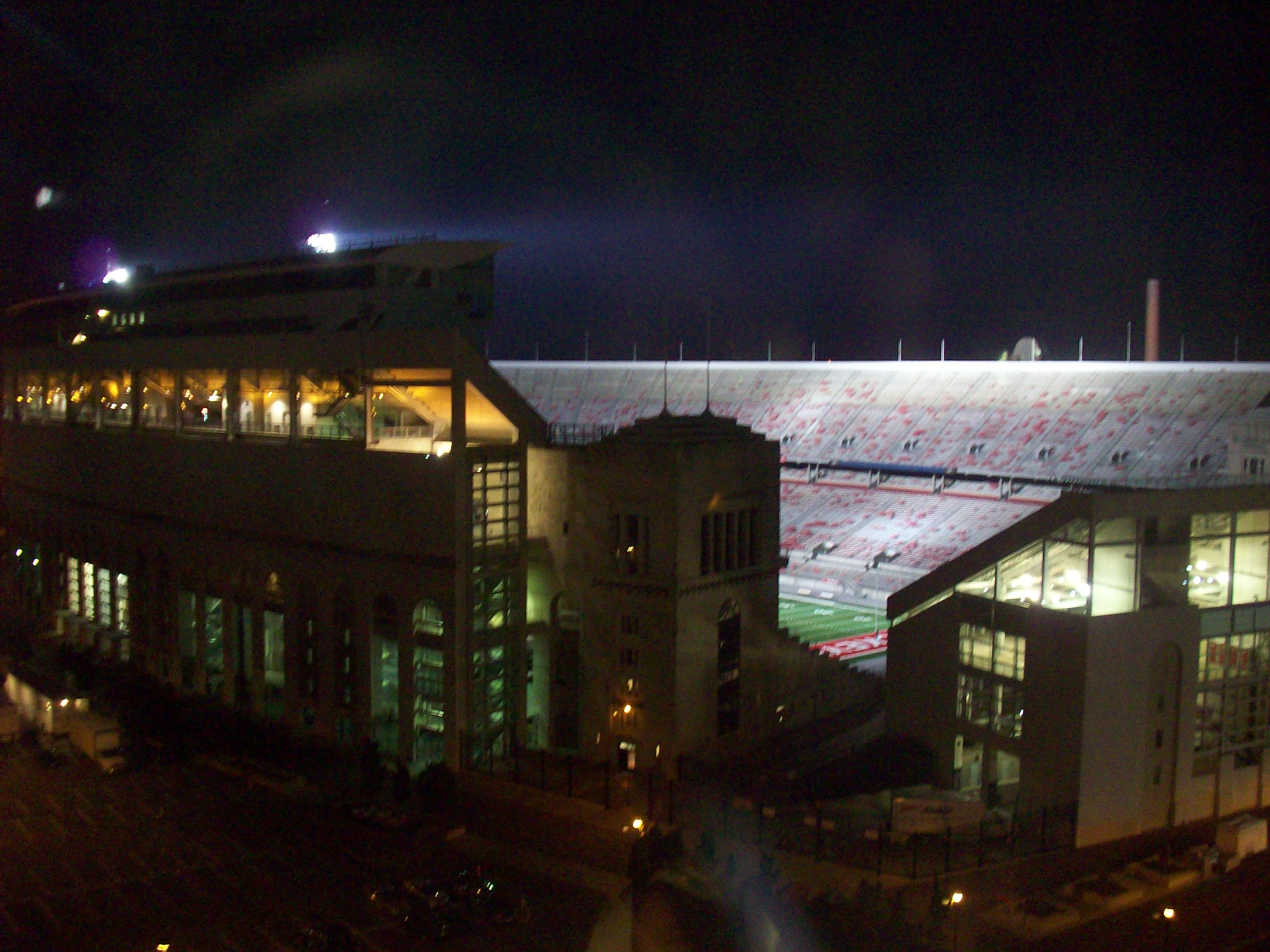
The game was the 14th night game in Ohio Stadium history

Ohio State got the ball to start the game, and promptly drove down the field on a 7-play, 75-yard drive culminating with a touchdown run by Carlos Hyde. Penn State responded with a solid drive of their own, running 12 plays and getting to the 12-yard line before Christian Hackenberg threw an interception in the end zone. The two teams exchanged punts, and then Ohio State scored, this time via a 39-yard run from their quarterback Braxton Miller. Hackenberg threw another interception late in the quarter, and Ohio State, early in the second quarter, capitalized with another touchdown. After scoring again, Penn State scored points for their first time to make the score 28–7, off a 12-yard touchdown reception by Brandon Felder. Ohio State scored twice more, and the halftime score was a 42–7 Ohio State advantage. After exchanging punts to start the second half, Zach Zwinak lost a fumble in Penn State territory for the second consecutive week, and for the second consecutive week, he did not carry the ball after it. It took Ohio State only two plays to take advantage, scoring a touchdown on a Miller pass to Dontre Wilson. On Penn State's next drive, Tyler Ferguson replaced Hackenberg at quarterback due to an injury he sustained earlier in the game, Ferguson was no more effective, as Penn State ultimately punted. Ohio State scored once more in the third quarter, and they led 56–7 headed into the fourth quarter. After another touchdown for Ohio State, Ferguson threw a touchdown pass to Allen Robinson in which Robinson caught the screen pass behind the line of scrimmage, "runs around, weaving thru traffic from one sideline to the other, and finishes in the end zone for a touchdown". That would be the final scoring play of the game, which ended 63–14.

In what linebacker Mike Hull described as "the worst game I've experienced", Penn State allowed the most points it had since 1899, when they lost to the Duquesne Country and Athletic Club on November 25, 1899, 64–5. Ohio State totaled 686 total yards, whereas Penn State totaled 357. The game thrust the Buckeyes into consideration to play in the 2014 BCS National Championship Game, while it subjugated Christian Hackenberg, who "wasn't ready for Ohio State or the 'Shoe", according to an article on Bleacher Report. An article from SBNation.com noted, "This Penn State one is a talented but extremely flawed one, flawed, especially defensively, in ways that are blatant and clear and easy for any well-coached offense to exploit, and flawed on offense with youth and with inexperience, destined to repeat the past because they must before it gets any better."

Penn State starting lineup

Offense
Position	Player	Class
LT	Donovan Smith	SO
LG	Miles Dieffenbach	JR
C	Ty Howle	SR
RG	John Urschel	SR
RT	Adam Gress	SR
TE	Jesse James	SO
QB	Christian Hackenberg	FR
RB	Bill Belton	JR
TE	Kyle Carter	SO
TE	Adam Breneman	FR
WR	Allen Robinson	JR

Defense
Position	Player	Class
DE	C. J. Olaniyan	JR
DT	DaQuan Jones	SR
DT	Kyle Baublitz	JR
DE	Deion Barnes	SO
OLB	Mike Hull	JR
MLB	Glenn Carson	SR
OLB	Nyeem Wartman	FR
CB	Trevor Williams (American football)	SO
S	Jesse Della Valle	JR
S	Adrian Amos	JR
CB	Jordan Lucas	SO

Special teams
Position	Player	Class
K	Sam Ficken	JR
P	Alex Butterworth	SR

=== November 2 vs. Illinois ===
Penn State vs. Illinois – Game summary

Quarter	1	2	3	4	OT	Total
Illinois	0	3	7	7	0	17
Penn State	7	7	0	3	7	24

at Beaver Stadium

- Date: November 2
- Game time: 12:00 p.m. EDT
- Game weather: 50 °F (10 °C), cloudy, breezy, few showers
- Game attendance: 95,131
- Referee: Dan Capron
- TV announcers (ESPN): Beth Mowins (play-by-play), Joey Galloway (analyst), Loren Crispell (sideline)
- ESPN Box Score

Game information

First quarter

- PSU – Bill Belton, 5-yard run, Sam Ficken XP good, 9:44 (PSU 7–0)

Second quarter

- PSU – Christian Hackenberg, 9-yard run, Ficken XP good, 13:13 (PSU 14–0)
- ILL – Taylor Zalewski, 20-yard field goal, 0:00 (PSU 14–3)

Third quarter

- ILL – Josh Ferguson, 8-yard run, Zalewski XP good, 4:47 (PSU 14–10)

Fourth quarter

- ILL – Ferguson, 7-yard pass from Nathan Scheelhaase, Zalewski XP good, 5:30 (ILL 17–14)
- PSU – Ficken, 37-yard field goal, 0:41 (TIE 17–17)

Overtime

- PSU – Kyle Carter, 15-yard pass from Hackenberg, Ficken XP good (PSU 24–17)

Top passer

- Christian Hackenberg – 20/32, 240 yards, TD

Top rusher

- Bill Belton – 36 rushes, 201 yards, TD

Top receiver

- Allen Robinson – 11 receptions, 165 yards

Top defender

- Mike Hull – 13 tackles

Coming off a shellacking against Ohio State, Penn State looked to rebound behind a strong defensive effort against Illinois. Linebacker Mike Hull noted, "Practice Monday and (Tuesday) was real energetic and we were smacking people out there. We’re ready to play another game on Saturday and get that taste of losing out of our mouth." Keys to the game included moving on from the prior Saturday's defeat, limiting big plays on defense, containing Illinois quarterback Nathan Scheelhaase, and protecting quarterback Christian Hackenberg. A pre-game analysis of statistical comparisons between the two squads gave Penn State an advantage in most offensive and defensive stats, while it gave Illinois an advantage on special teams. The analyst blamed sanctions imposed by NCAA president Mark Emmert in wake of the Penn State child sex abuse scandal for that disparity, citing scholarship reductions hampering depth.

Illinois got the ball to start the game, and on their opening drive, Scheelhaase threw an interception, setting up Penn State at their own 16, from which they ran a 7-play, 84-yard drive highlighted by a 47-yard pass to Allen Robinson, and culminating with Bill Belton rushing for a 1-yard touchdown. Penn State scored on their second drive as well, a lengthy 17-play drive that encapsulated 7:15, and resulted in Christian Hackenberg running for a 9-yard touchdown early in the second quarter to take a 14–0 lead. After another Illinois punt, Penn State again drove down the field, but Sam Ficken missed a 37-yard field goal, his first miss on a kick inside of 40 yards on the season. On the final drive of the first half, Illinois finally achieved points, with kicker Taylor Zalewski making a 21-yard field goal as time expired. After Penn State's first second-half drive faltered, Illinois took the field, and embarked on a 13-play, 88-yard drive, ended by an 8-yard touchdown run from Josh Ferguson. At the end of the third quarter, Penn State led 14–10. In the fourth quarter, the two teams each failed to score on their first drive, but on Illinois' second, Scheelhaase connected with Ferguson on a 7-yard pass to finish off a 13-play, 77-yard drive and take the lead for the first time in the game. Penn State's ensuing drive had promise, but ultimately ended when Belton lost a fumble at the two-yard line. Illinois failed to capitalize, however, and went three-and-out. Taking the field in Illinois territory, Penn State drove into field goal range, at which point Ficken made a 37-yard field goal to tie the game at 17 with 0:41 remaining. Illinois got the ball back, but after a false start penalty on them and a subsequent off-sides penalty on Penn State, they called timeout, and ran one additional play, on which Penn State recorded their first sack of the game. Time expired. In overtime, Penn State's second overtime game in their past three, they got the ball to start, and were faced with a third-down situation needing 11 yards to convert at the 15-yard line. Coming out of a timeout following a holding penalty that brought back a touchdown, Kyle Carter made his first and only reception of the day, a 15-yard touchdown pass thrown into a tight window by Hackenberg on one of Penn State's "favorite" plays known simply as "pearl". Illinois did not achieve a touchdown on their subsequent drive, as Ryan Keiser intercepted a pass on its first play, ending the game with Penn State emerging victorious, 24–17.

In a victory that coach Bill O'Brien refused to describe as either "ugly" or "fortunate" despite a variety of media sources doing so, one article from Lancaster Newspapers described the game by saying,

This was some bad football played by two teams going nowhere, both ailing mentally and emotionally over having been beaten on the road in their previous outings by a combined 88 points. And after a long day of players and coaches and officials throwing up all over each other, the truth that Illinois has not won a Big Ten game since Nov. 8, 2011 ... Which is to say, it came down to Illinois doing what it does, which is finding a way to lose, and Penn State doing what it (more often than not) does, which is to find a way to win.

Offensively, Penn State totaled 25 first downs, two fewer than Illinois, but 490 total offensive yards, exceeding Illinois by 79. Allen Robinson caught 11 passes, and was the only Penn State receiver with more than three catches. The shuffled offensive line on which Donovan Smith did not start, "yes, allowed a sack, and yes, committed a few penalties, but generally opened up gaping holes in the run game, gave Hackenberg plenty of time to throw, and controlled the line of scrimmage". Running back Bill Belton set career highs with both 36 rushes and 201 yards, and was named Big Ten co-offensive player of the week. It was the first time a Penn State player had rushed for over 200 yards since Larry Johnson in 2002. Defensively, Penn State stopped Illinois for a loss of yardage on only four plays, and though linebackers Mike Hull and Glenn Carson combined for 24 tackles, they had no interceptions, forced fumbles, sacks, or tackles for loss between them. The secondary struggled, though did record two interceptions, mitigating their overall ineffectiveness, much of which, however, stemmed from defensive coordinator John Butler's incessant third-down blitzes, leaving one-on-one coverage for overmatched cornerbacks such as Jordan Lucas.

Penn State starting lineup

Offense
Position	Player	Class
LT	Adam Gress	SR
LG	Miles Dieffenbach	JR
C	Ty Howle	SR
RG	John Urschel	SR
RT	Garry Gilliam	JR
QB	Christian Hackenberg	FR
RB	Bill Belton	JR
TE	Jesse James	SO
TE	Adam Breneman	FR
WR	Allen Robinson	JR
WR	Brandon Felder	SR

Defense
Position	Player	Class
DE	C. J. Olaniyan	JR
DT	DaQuan Jones	SR
DT	Austin Johnson	FR
DE	Anthony Zettel	JR
OLB	Mike Hull	JR
MLB	Glenn Carson	SR
OLB	Ben Kline	SO
CB	Adrian Amos	JR
S	Jesse Della Valle	JR
S	Malcolm Willis	SR
CB	Jordan Lucas	SO

Special teams
Position	Player	Class
K	Sam Ficken	JR
P	Alex Butterworth	SR

=== November 9 vs. Minnesota ===
Penn State vs. Minnesota – Game summary

Quarter	1	2	3	4	Total
Penn State	7	3	0	0	10
Minnesota	10	14	0	0	24

at TCF Bank Stadium

- Date: November 9
- Game time: 12:00 p.m. EDT
- Game weather: 36 °F (2 °C), broken clouds
- Game attendance: 48,123
- Referee: Todd Geerlings
- TV announcers (ESPN2): Beth Mowins (play-by-play), Joey Galloway (analyst), Paul Carcaterra (sideline)
- ESPN Box Score

Game information

First quarter

- MINN – Chris Hawthorne, 45 yard field goal, 13:33 (MINN 3–0)
- MINN – David Cobb, 1 yard run, Hawthorne XP good, 3:08 (MINN 10–0)
- PSU – Zach Zwinak, 6 yard run, Sam Ficken XP good, 1:02 (MINN 10–7)

Second quarter

- MINN – Philip Nelson, 6 yard run, Hawthorne XP good, 9:08 (MINN 17–7)
- PSU – Ficken, 27 yard field goal, 3:11 (MINN 17–10)
- MINN – Maxx Williams, 24 yard pass from Nelson, Hawthorne XP good, 0:17 (MINN 24–10)

Third quarter

- No scoring

Fourth quarter

- No scoring

Top passer

- Christian Hackenberg – 14/25, 163 yards

Top rusher

- Zach Zwinak – 26 rushes, 150 yards, TD

Top receiver

- Allen Robinson – 7 receptions, 63 yards

Top defender

- Mike Hull – 9 tackles

In the teams' first meeting since 2010, Penn State visited TCF Bank Stadium to face a Minnesota team looking for their fourth consecutive Big Ten victory, and their eighth win of the season, which would have been their first time since the 2003 season. There was consensus among both Penn State's and Minnesota's SB Nation sites, as well as independent picks, that Minnesota would win a relatively close game. Minnesota's offense was one of the better rushing teams in the conference (20th in the nation), but Penn State's defense was also pretty good against the run, making it a good matchup. Freshman quarterback Christian Hackenberg in tandem with a running game that, in theory, was led by Bill Belton and supplemented by Zach Zwinak, and receivers Allen Robinson had potential to score a lot of points. Keys to the game included avoiding turnovers and running the football. Minnesota head coach Jerry Kill, recovering from seizures stemming from epilepsy, coached from the press box.

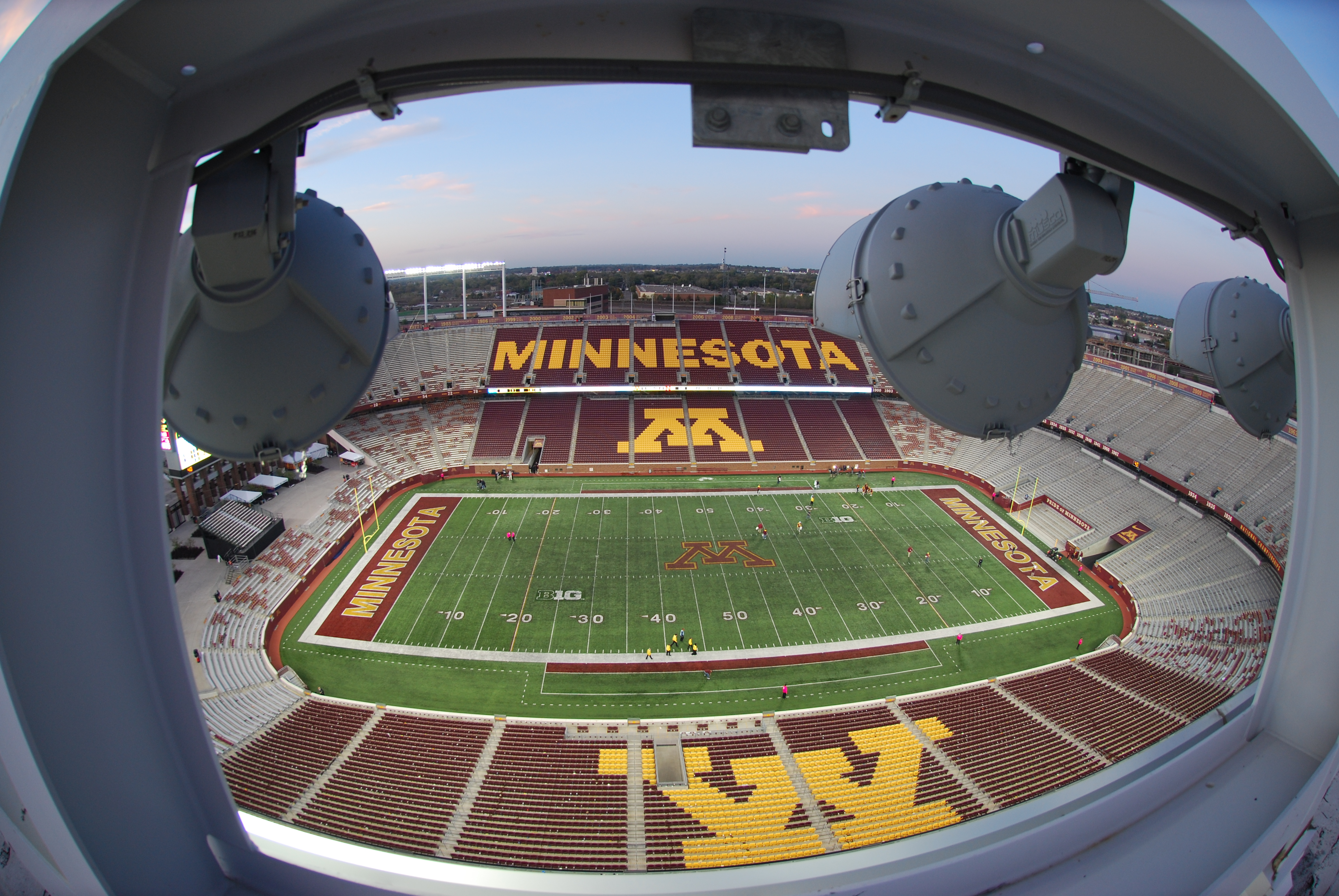
The game marked Penn State's first visit to TCF Bank Stadium

Penn State received the opening kickoff, however on their first play from scrimmage, Bill Belton lost a fumble and Minnesota recovered and kicked a field goal after failing to achieve a first down. Penn State's punt on the subsequent drive was downed at the four-yard line, but the poor field position did not adversely affect Minnesota, who drove down the field for a 15-play, 96-yard drive, highlighted by a 24-yard pass from Philip Nelson to Maxx Williams to convert a fourth down to get down to the Penn State four-yard line, from which point they scored two plays later via a 1-yard run by David Cobb. Penn State responded, however, with Zach Zwinak rushing the ball 5 times for 61 yards including a 38-yard run, and ultimately a 6-yard touchdown scamper. At the end of the first quarter, Minnesota led 10–7. In the second quarter, Minnesota wasted no time, embarking on a 13-play, 70-yard drive that lasted 6:54 and ended with Nelson rushing for a 6-yard touchdown. Penn State responded, driving down the field on 13 plays for 65 yards lasting 5:57, culminating with Ficken kicking a 27-yard field goal after the drive stalled in the red zone. Late in the half, Minnesota drove down the field, and Nelson completed a 24-yard touchdown pass to Williams, putting Minnesota on top 24–10 at the half. Receiving the second half kickoff, Minnesota initiated a drive that included a 39-yard run by Cobb, but ultimately ended in their first punt of the day, which they downed inside the one-yard line. Penn State achieved two first downs, but an illegal block in the back on Jesse James decimated the drive, which ended with a punt, but they caught a break a play later when Minnesota fumbled and Malcolm Willis recovered in Minnesota territory. The break did not materialize with any points, but their subsequent punt was downed inside the five yard line. Dreadful field position continued when, after driving for several yards, Minnesota's punt settled inside the five yard line, again setting Penn State up with a long field. In the waning moments of the third quarter, Penn State relied on Zwinak, who rushed several consecutive times to garner Penn State breathing room. There was no scoring in the third quarter. Penn State failed to convert a third down (they had still not converted any in the game), but Minnesota committed a roughing the kicker penalty, giving Penn State a second chance with which they converted their first third down of the game, but ultimately turned the ball over on downs. After a Minnesota punt, Penn State, for the first drive of the game, relied on their passing game to drive down the field, but, when faced with a fourth down and ten deep in Minnesota territory, failed to convert. On Minnesota's ensuing possession, however, they managed to run only 47 seconds off the clock, and went three-and-out. Hoping not to again blow an opportunity, Penn State moved promptly down the field, and got into the red zone. While there, a pass to Allen Robinson resulted in a pass interference penalty called against Minnesota, giving Penn State the ball at the two-yard line, from where they fumbled, and Minnesota recovered, and embarked on a possession from which they would not relinquish the ball, winning the game 24–10, after no scoring in the second half.

Following their victory and awarding of the Governor's Victory Bell, Minnesota players, purportedly "a little excited after ... the team’s first win over the Nittany Lions in nearly a decade", broke the trophy. For Penn State, though coming off a 200-rushing yard performance, Belton took a back seat in the rushing attack to Zwinak after fumbling in the first quarter. In total, The Morning Call graded Penn State's offense by awarding them a C−, noting the lack of scoring despite opportunities in Minnesota territory, though noting Zwinak's resurgence as a mitigating factor. They awarded the defense the same grade, noting that though they improved in the second half, they were "torched" on consecutive drives early in the game. They summarized Penn State's coaching with a comment from O'Brien: "It seemed like, when we made a call, they had the right call for it." In total, the article asserted that overall, Minnesota was the superior team. StateCollege.com's Ben Jones predominantly concurred, giving the offense a C−, but giving the defense a C+, noting that the defense did keep Penn State competitive in the game.

Penn State starting lineup

Offense
Position	Player	Class
LT	Donovan Smith	SO
LG	Miles Dieffenbach	JR
C	Ty Howle	SR
RG	John Urschel	SR
RT	Adam Gress	SR
QB	Christian Hackenberg	FR
RB	Bill Belton	JR
FB	Pat Zerbe	SR
TE	Jesse James	SO
WR	Allen Robinson	JR
WR	Brandon Felder	SR

Defense
Position	Player	Class
DE	C. J. Olaniyan	JR
DT	DaQuan Jones	SR
DT	Kyle Baublitz	JR
DE	Deion Barnes	SO
OLB	Mike Hull	JR
MLB	Glenn Carson	SR
OLB	Ben Kline	SO
CB	Adrian Amos	JR
S	Ryan Keiser	JR
S	Malcolm Willis	SR
CB	Jordan Lucas	SO

Special teams
Position	Player	Class
K	Sam Ficken	JR
P	Alex Butterworth	SR

=== November 16 vs. Purdue ===
Penn State vs. Purdue – Game summary

Quarter	1	2	3	4	Total
Purdue	0	14	7	0	21
Penn State	14	14	10	7	45

at Beaver Stadium

- Date: November 16
- Game time: 12:00 p.m. EDT
- Game weather: 52 °F (11 °C), increasing clouds
- Game attendance: 96,491
- Referee: Mike Cannon
- TV announcers (BTN): Eric Collins (play-by-play), Chuck Long (analyst), Jon Jansen (sideline)
- ESPN Box Score

Game information

First quarter

- PSU – Bill Belton, 5 yard run, Sam Ficken XP good, 9:11 (PSU 7–0)
- PSU – Zach Zwinak, 1 yard run, Ficken XP good, 3:03 (PSU 14–0)

Second quarter

- PUR – Justin Sinz, 2 yard pass from Danny Etling, Paul Griggs XP good, 13:48 (PSU 14–7)
- PSU – Zwinak, 1 yard run, Ficken XP good, 9:35 (PSU 21–7)
- PSU – Adam Breneman, 8 yard pass from Christian Hackenberg, Ficken XP good, 1:18 (PSU 28–7)
- PUR – Raheem Mostert, 100 yard kickoff return, Griggs XP good, 1:05 (PSU 28–14)

Third quarter

- PUR – Etling, 11 yard run, Griggs XP good, 11:19 (PSU 28–21)
- PSU – Ficken, 29 yard field goal, 8:51 (PSU 31–21)
- PSU – Zwinak, 5 yard run, Ficken XP good, 5:21 (PSU 38–21)

Fourth quarter

- PSU – Hackenberg, 4 yard run, Ficken XP good, 4:27 (PSU 45–21)

Top passer

- Christian Hackenberg – 16/23, 212 yards, TD, INT

Top rusher

- Zach Zwinak – 26 rushes, 149 yards, 3 TD

Top receiver

- Allen Robinson – 8 receptions, 98 yards

Top defender

- Adrian Amos – 8 tackles, 2.5 TFL, 1.5 sacks

Coming off a loss to Minnesota the preceding week, Penn State looked to defeat Purdue, which they had in every meeting since 2004. Though expected to beat an overmatched Purdue squad that was reeling, having lost 38–14 the prior week against Iowa, and 56–0 the week before that against Ohio State, and entering the game with a 1–8 record, the Lions would have to do so with even less depth than normal. At his mid-week press conference, Bill O'Brien announced at the midweek press conference that Ben Kline would miss the remainder of the season with a shoulder injury, for which he sustained surgery. There was also some pregame concentration surrounding the receiving corps – Allen Robinson was listed on the injury report with a shoulder injury, and Geno Lewis, who had proved to be a potential big play threat early in the season when he caught a 54-yard touchdown pass against Syracuse, but had recently been relegated to special teams, was also expected to receive increased playing time in Penn State's second-to-last home game of the season.

Penn State received the opening kickoff, and on their first play from scrimmage, featured six offensive linemen (albeit unsuccessfully, as Bill Belton rushed for a one-yard loss), before driving down the field on a 13-play, 75-yard drive that culminated with Belton rushing for a five-yard touchdown; he carried the load on the drive, rushing the ball eight times for 36 yards. Penn State would never relinquish that lead. Purdue subsequently went three-and-out, and Penn State responded with another long drive (10 plays, 66 yards) that again culminated with a rushing touchdown, this time from Zach Zwinak on a one-yard run, his tenth touchdown of the season, becoming the 16th Penn State player to eclipse 10, and the first since 2008, when both Evan Royster and Daryll Clark did. Purdue's ensuing drive ended in the second quarter when quarterback Danny Etling threw a two-yard touchdown pass to Justin Sinz, making the score 14–7 Penn State. Bill Belton lost a fumble on Penn State's next drive, but Purdue turned the ball over right back to Penn State when Jordan Lucas intercepted an Etling pass. Zwinak rushed for his second one-yard touchdown of the game on the ensuing possession. The Nittany Lions scored once more in the first half, via an eight-yard pass from Christian Hackenberg to Adam Breneman, but on the ensuing kickoff, Purdue's Raheem Mostert scored a touchdown on a 100-yard return, thus ending the first half with a score of 28–14, Penn State holding the advantage. Purdue came out of halftime with a vengeance, driving down the field for 84-yards, ultimately pulling within 7 points on an 11-yard rush by Etling. The first field goal of the game occurred on Penn State's subsequent drive, a 29-yarder from Sam Ficken putting the Nittany Lions ahead 31–21. The Boilermakers turned the ball over again on their next drive, and Penn State capitalized when Zwinak rushed for his third touchdown of the game. Purdue turned the ball over on downs their final drive of the third quarter, though Hackenberg threw an interception giving Purdue an opportunity early in the fourth quarter; again, a fumble eliminated any chance of a scoring drive coming to fruition, and Penn State went up 45–21 when Hackenberg rushed for a 4-yard touchdown to culminate an 11-play, 74-yard drive that encapsulated over a third of the fourth quarter, and ended with 4:27 to play. That would be the final scoring drive of the game, which Penn State won by the aforementioned score, 45–21.

In a game in which Penn State dominated the line of scrimmage, the Nittany Lions rushed for 289 yards behind an offensive line that opened up significant holes, allowing Penn State to achieve their goal of rushing the football, despite not achieving offensive tackle Garry Gilliam's goal of 400 yards. Purdue's coach Darrell Hazell had opined earlier in the week that Penn State's offensive line was not as good as previous opponents Wisconsin and Iowa, and Penn State used it as motivation, dominating the line of scrimmage, which numerous offensive lineman noted was "fun". Starting center Ty Howle, who noted,"It's fun, knowing you can go out there and impose your will each play. It's a lot of fun." and all-conference guard John Urschel, who agreed, saying, "This was a real fun game for us, with respect to coming off the ball and just hitting guys. The offensive linemen really enjoyed it. We were having a blast. When you're an offensive lineman and you're getting yards, you want to run the ball over and over again." Allen Robinson caught his 78th pass of the season with his fifth catch of the game, and in doing so topped his 77 catches from the 2012 season. Aside from offensive accomplishments, the defense was also impressive, particularly play from Jordan Lucas, who ESPN commented earlier in the week plays with "swagger", and who, during the game, intercepted a pass, garnering a comment from The Patriot News that he is the "top playmaker in the secondary". Despite jubilation from the victory, including one Penn State player who quipped that the sixth win made Penn State bowl eligible (the NCAA banned Penn State from bowl participation as part of sanctions imposed in the Penn State child sex abuse scandal), seniors nostalgically remembered this was their second-to-last game at Beaver Stadium. The Lions bounced back from their previous loss against Minnesota, and had not lost two consecutive games under Bill O'Brien since their first two in 2012.

Penn State starting lineup

Offense
Position	Player	Class
LT	Donovan Smith	SO
LG	Miles Dieffenbach	JR
C	Ty Howle	SR
RG	John Urschel	SR
RT	Adam Gress	SR
T	Eric Shrive	SR
QB	Christian Hackenberg	FR
RB	Bill Belton	JR
FB	Pat Zerbe	SR
TE	Jesse James	SO
WR	Allen Robinson	JR

Defense
Position	Player	Class
DE	C. J. Olaniyan	JR
DT	DaQuan Jones	SR
DT	Kyle Baublitz	JR
DE	Deion Barnes	SO
OLB	Mike Hull	JR
MLB	Glenn Carson	SR
OLB	Nyeem Wartman	FR
CB	Adrian Amos	JR
S	Ryan Keiser	JR
S	Malcolm Willis	SR
CB	Jordan Lucas	SO

Special teams
Position	Player	Class
K	Sam Ficken	JR
P	Alex Butterworth	SR

=== November 23 vs. Nebraska ===
Penn State vs. Nebraska – Game summary

Quarter	1	2	3	4	OT	Total
Nebraska	0	7	10	3	3	23
Penn State	6	0	7	7	0	20

at Beaver Stadium

- Date: November 23
- Game time: 3:30 p.m. EDT
- Game weather: 36 °F (2 °C), snow showers
- Game attendance: 98,517
- Referee: Jerry McGinn
- TV announcers (BTN): Eric Collins (play-by-play), Chuck Long (analyst), Jon Jansen (sideline)
- ESPN Box Score

Game information

First quarter

- PSU – Adam Breneman, 2 yard pass from Christian Hackenberg, Sam Ficken missed XP (off goal post), 0:33 (PSU 6–0)

Second quarter

- NEB – Quincy Enunwa, 27 yard pass from Ron Kellogg III, Pat Smith XP good, 13:14 (NEB 7–6)

Third quarter

- PSU – Hackenberg, 7 yard run, Ficken XP good, 10:37 (PSU 13–7)
- NEB – Kenny Bell, 99 yard kickoff return for touchdown, Smith XP good, 10:22 (NEB 14–13)
- NEB – Smith, 39 yard field goal, 1:11 (NEB 17–13)

Fourth quarter

- PSU – Jesse James, 46 yard pass from Hackenberg, Ficken XP good, 14:50 (PSU 20–17)
- NEB – Smith, 19 yard field goal, 4:29 (TIE 20–20)

Overtime

- NEB – Smith, 42 yard field goal (NEB 23–20)

Top passer

- Christian Hackenberg – 16/33, 217 yards, 2 TD, INT

Top rusher

- Zach Zwinak – 35 rushes, 149 yards

Top receiver

- Allen Robinson – 8 receptions, 106 yards

Top defender

- Glenn Carson – 10 tackles

On Senior Day at Penn State, the final home game of the season, the 6–4 Lions were set to host the 7–3 Nebraska Cornhuskers, however despite the Huskers having the better record, the opening line gave Penn State a two-point advantage. Earlier in the week, it was announced that, in addition to the 14 seniors, Penn State would honor defensive tackle Kyle Baublitz, offensive tackle Garry Gilliam, and wide receiver Alex Kenney on the field prior to the game; none of the three planned to return for the 2014 season despite each having an additional year of eligibility. Offensively for Penn State, Biletnikoff Award semifinalist wide receiver Allen Robinson entered the game by far Penn State's biggest threat in the passing game, with three times more receptions (81) entering the game than Penn State's second receiver, Brandon Felder (27). Perhaps the biggest opportunity for Penn State's offense to achieve success against Nebraska's defense, however, was through the running game, either on the coattails of Bill Belton or Zach Zwinak; Nebraska's run defense had frequently been "gouged" against Big Ten offenses. Similarly, Nebraska's offense would have an opportunity to continue to achieve success through its running game, led by Ameer Abdullah, who entered the game averaging 6.5 yards per carry. He had picked up the slack in the absence of their prior starter at quarterback Taylor Martinez, sidelined due to injury. Penn State coach Bill O'Brien predicted that whichever team committed fewer turnovers would win, as both teams had previously experienced problems with turnovers, both entering the game with negative turnover margins. Both teams entered the game with freshmen quarterbacks, in Christian Hackenberg for Penn State, and Tommy Armstrong for Nebraska, but both teams' primary playmakers came from outside the quarterback position, with Robinson for Penn State, and Abdullah for Nebraska. According to York Daily Record writer Frank Bodani, Penn State's offense was more consistent than Nebraska's, who committed too many turnovers, giving Penn State the edge. Defensively, Penn State was hit-or-miss in their secondary as well as in stopping the run, so Nebraska, who was also inconsistent, held a slight edge with their playmakers Randy Gregory and Ciante Evans, Nebraska also held an edge on special teams due to consistency and depth, but Penn State had superior coaching as well as intangibles, with a "roaring crowd" on Senior Day. With two hit-or-miss squads, most writers thought this would be a relatively close game, though a plurality leaned towards Nebraska edging out a victory, however some thought that Penn State's seniors would come out with a vengeance, never having defeated Nebraska since they joined the Big Ten, and the "resilient" group would use that motivation to eke out a victory in their final game at Beaver Stadium.

Shortly before the game, Penn State announced tailback Bill Belton would not play due to illness, leaving Zach Zwinak to carry the load in the running game in the snow. Nebraska received the opening kickoff, and promptly went three-and-out, forcing a punt, which though Penn State returner Jesse Della Valle fumbled, but the Lions recovered, setting up Penn State at their own 23 yard line, but they too went three-and-out. Nebraska's second drive, however, got off to a much better start, as Ameer Abdullah rushed for a 25-yard gain on the drive's first play, but ultimately Penn State's defense held on a later third down and short play, forcing another punt. Penn State's subsequent drive showed promise, with Zwinak rushing for a few first downs (on one of which Nebraska star defensive back Cionte Evans was injured; he returned a few drives later), however they eventually punted, and for the second time, Alex Butterworth pinned them inside the 20, and Nebraska failed to execute, punting for the third time; on the punt return, Della Valle redeemed himself with a 25-yard return into Nebraska territory. Penn State took advantage of the field position, and in the waning seconds of the first quarter, Hackenberg threw a two-yard touchdown to Adam Breneman after Zwinak rushed the ball six times for a total of 27 yards; Sam Ficken missed the extra point, his first extra point miss of the season. Penn State led at the end of the first quarter, 6–0. On Nebraska's next drive, they entered with senior Ron Kellogg III at quarterback, after Armstrong's ineffectiveness. Kellogg III came in firing on all cylinders, completing his first three passes, before Abdullah ran for a first down, and then Kellogg III completed another pass, this time for a touchdown on a 27-yard pass to Quincy Enunwa. Nebraska made the extra point, taking a one-point lead. Penn State's next drive stalled, and again Butterworth was able to pin Nebraska inside the 20 on the ensuing punt. Nebraska subsequently went three-and-out, setting Penn State up with solid field position at their own 37-yard line. They got one first down, and were positioned for another, but Felder dropped a pass, and Penn State's ensuing punt was blocked after Butterworth dropped the low snap, setting up Nebraska in Penn State territory. Nebraska recorded the game's first third down conversion en route to getting the ball in the red zone. On a snap to Abdullah from the wildcat formation, he ran up the middle, but fumbled into the end zone, and Della Valle recovered in the end zone, setting Penn State up with some momentum at their 20-yard line, however they were unable to capitalize, going three-and-out. Nebraska's ensuing drive stalled, and they punted. Penn State came out trying to score before the half, and they did achieve a few first downs, but ultimately punted, and Nebraska downed the ball to go into half time leading by one. Coming out of the half, the snow showers returned, and Penn State got the ball to start the half, and they did convert a third down for the first time of the game, however again, their drive stalled, and Butterworth punted the ball for the sixth time. Nebraska faced a third-and-long on their next drive, and on the play, C. J. Olaniyan sacked the quarterback, and forced and recovered a fumble, setting Penn State up inside the Nebraska 10 yard line. Two plays later, with the snow increasing in intensity, Hackenberg ran a play-action bootleg and rolled right, running for a 7-yard touchdown, putting Penn State up 13–7, as this time, Ficken made the extra point. The lead did not last long; Kenny Bell returned the ensuing kickoff for a 99-yard touchdown, the second consecutive week Penn State surrendered a return touchdown. Back where they started at the beginning of the half in terms of scoring differential, Penn State got the ball inside their own 20 after Geno Lewis fumbled the kickoff return (he recovered). Penn State achieved a first down on the drive, but a false start penalty set up a third-and-long situation from which they could not recover. They punted. Nebraska also punted on their next drive, and the punt was downed at the one-yard line. They did not remain in the shadow of their own goal post for long, as Zwinak rushed for four yards, and then, on a play action pass, Hackenberg threw a 43-yard pass to Allen Robinson. Two plays later, however, Evans intercepted Hackenberg's pass, giving Nebraska good field position at their own 48. They capitalized, kicking a field goal, going up by four. The Huskers led 17–13 at the end of the third quarter. On the first play of the fourth quarter, Jesse James caught a pass in the flat on a third-and-three, and ran down the sideline for a 46-yard touchdown putting Penn State up 20–17. Penn State quickly got the ball back, and looked to milk clock with Zwinak running the football, however two incomplete passes decimated the drive, and they punted it back to Nebraska. After exchanging punts, Nebraska embarked on a drive that had a 62-yard run by Abdullah called back due to a personal foul penalty called. The foul occurred deep into the run, so Nebraska still got the ball at Penn State's 27-yard line. Subsequently, they moved the ball into the red zone, and got it down to the one-yard line before a false start backed them up to the six-yard line ... one play later, they called timeout, and on the next play, Kellogg III scrambled and got to the one-yard line before he and Mike Hull collided, jarring the ball loose, but the ruling was that Nebraska maintained possession, and Smith made a 19-yard field goal to tie the game at 20. When Penn State received the subsequent kickoff, they ran the ball several times, and ultimately punted the ball away with 1:40 remaining from their 38-yard line; it was downed at the five-yard line, setting up Nebraska with two of their three timeouts and 1:31 remaining. Nebraska was backed up inside their one on third-and-long, and threw a long pass that fell incomplete, however Jordan Lucas was flagged for pass interference. The next series, however, was decimated by penalties, and ultimately, Nebraska punted the ball away, and the game went into overtime, Penn State's third OT game of the season (they won the first two). In overtime, Penn State got the ball first, and after failing to achieve a first down, lined up to attempt a field goal, but the typically reliable Ficken missed another kick, and Nebraska conservatively positioned themselves for a field goal try on their ensuing possession. They lined up for a 37-yard field goal, but committed a false start penalty backing them up five yards. It did not matter, however, as Smith hit a 42-yard field goal to win the game, 23–20.

Nebraska dominated Penn State on special teams, and ultimately, that advantage led to their victory. If it were not for Sam Ficken missing an extra point in the first quarter, Nebraska would not have been able to settle for a field goal late in the second half to send the game into overtime. In addition to the missed extra point, Penn State allowed a kickoff to be returned for a touchdown for the second straight week, and had a punt blocked. Bill O'Brien commented, "We’ll continue to work hard in special teams. They’re good kids working hard." Offensively, Penn State's was plagued by dropped passes that hindered Christian Hackenberg's overall performance, while the running game, though led by Zach Zwinak who rushed for 149 yards, was one-dimensional, as backup Akeel Lynch could muster only nine yards on five carries. Penn State's defense was "in control for long stretches", but ultimately allowed a third-string quarterback to win the game, and also allowed Ameer Abdullah to rush for 147 yards. Prior to the game, Penn State's seniors were lauded with a video tribute that noted, "[Penn State was] led by your commitment, led by your loyalty, by your actions, led by example." This was their third overtime game of the season, but their first overtime loss since 2002.

Penn State starting lineup

Offense
Position	Player	Class
LT	Donovan Smith	SO
LG	Miles Dieffenbach	JR
C	Ty Howle	SR
RG	John Urschel	SR
RT	Adam Gress	SR
TE	Adam Breneman	FR
QB	Christian Hackenberg	FR
RB	Zach Zwinak	JR
TE	Jesse James	SO
WR	Geno Lewis	FR
WR	Allen Robinson	JR

Defense
Position	Player	Class
DE	C. J. Olaniyan	JR
DT	DaQuan Jones	SR
DT	Kyle Baublitz	JR
DE	Deion Barnes	SO
OLB	Mike Hull	JR
MLB	Glenn Carson	SR
OLB	Nyeem Wartman	FR
CB	Adrian Amos	JR
S	Ryan Keiser	JR
S	Malcolm Willis	SR
CB	Jordan Lucas	SO

Special teams
Position	Player	Class
K	Sam Ficken	JR
P	Alex Butterworth	SR

=== November 30 vs. Wisconsin ===
Penn State vs. Wisconsin – Game summary

Quarter	1	2	3	4	Total
Penn State	7	7	10	7	31
#14 Wisconsin	0	14	0	10	24

at Camp Randall Stadium, Madison, WI

- Date: November 30
- Game time: 3:30 p.m. EDT
- Game weather: 42 °F (6 °C), clear
- Game attendance: 78,064
- Referee: Bill LeMonnier
- TV announcers (ESPN): Mike Patrick (play-by-play), Ed Cunningham (analyst), Jeannine Edwards (sideline)
- ESPN Box Score

Game information

First quarter

- PSU – Adam Breneman, 68 yard pass from Christian Hackenberg, Sam Ficken XP good, 13:05 (PSU 7–0)

Second quarter

- WISC – Brian Wozniak, 4 yard pass from Joel Stave, Jack Russell XP good, 11:50 (TIE 7–7)
- WISC – Jeff Duckworth, 20 yard pass from Stave, Russell XP good, 5:05 (WISC 14–7)
- PSU – Geno Lewis, 3 yard pass from Hackenberg, Ficken XP good, 1:16 (TIE 14–14)

Third quarter

- PSU – Jesse James, 7 yard pass from Hackenberg, Ficken XP good, 8:29 (PSU 21–14)
- PSU – Ficken, 28 yard field goal, 4:56 (PSU 24–14)

Fourth quarter

- PSU – Lewis, 59 yard pass from Hackenberg, Ficken XP good, 12:59 (PSU 31–14)
- WISC – Wozniak, 5 yard pass from Stave, Russell XP good, 5:38 (PSU 31–21)
- WISC – Russell, 48 yard field goal, 4:13 (PSU 31–24)

Top passer

- Christian Hackenberg – 21/30, 339 yards, 4 TD

Top rusher

- Zach Zwinak – 22 rushes, 115 yards

Top receiver

- Allen Robinson – 8 receptions, 122 yards

Top defender

- Mike Hull – 7 tackles

In their final game of the season, Penn State looked to play spoiler and try to prevent Wisconsin from achieving a 10-win season and BCS Bowl opportunity in coach Gary Andersen's first season with the Badgers, who entered the game with a 9–2 record and were 24-point favorites to win the game. The Badgers entered the game still employing their quintessential offensive philosophy even under their new coach – a power running game behind a physical offensive line led by two of the top rushers in the country, Melvin Gordon and James White, both of whom were on the preseason watchlist for the Doak Walker Award (given to the nation's best running back) and the former of whom was named one of ten semifinalists for the award in mid-November. White, a tough runner in the middle of the field, had emerged in recent weeks, whereas Gordon, a speedster, led the team in rushing and led the country with an 8.2 yards-per-carry average. Wisconsin's offense also featured a strong passing game, highlighted by quarterback Joel Stave and favorite target Jared Abbrederis, however one game preview asserted that Penn State's defense matched up well against the Badgers' offense. Defensively, Wisconsin entered the game the fifth-best scoring defense in the country, allowing just 13.4 points per game. The "stingy" defense, the preview noted, would likely prove problematic for Penn State.

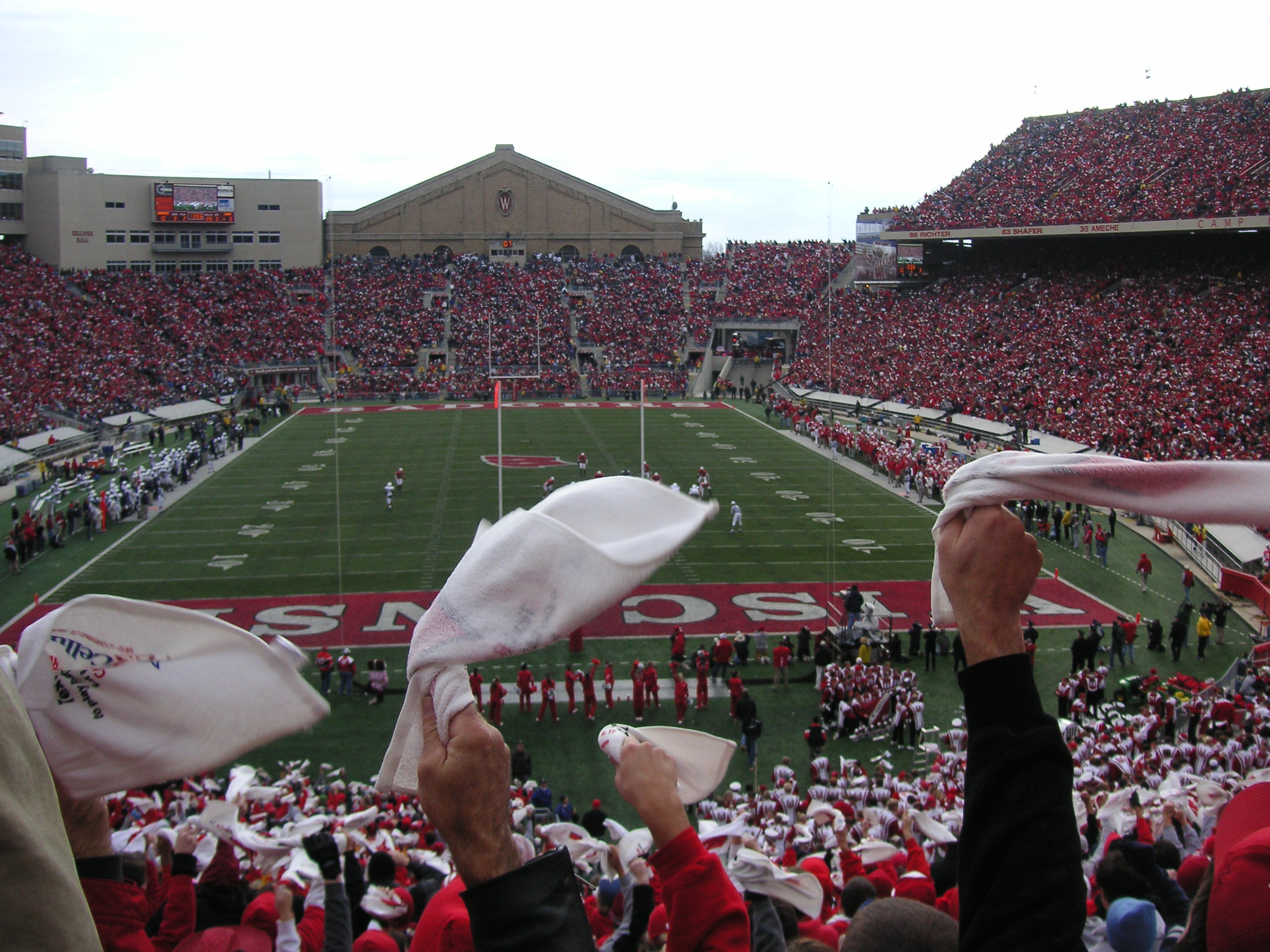
Camp Randall Stadium, the venue at which Penn State's final game of the season was played

Penn State received the opening kickoff, and after achieving a first down, Christian Hackenberg threw a 68-yard pass to fellow freshman Adam Breneman for a touchdown, the first offensive touchdown Wisconsin had allowed in the previous eight quarters. Wisconsin failed to respond, going three-and-out, and punting on their subsequent drive. Penn State, though they began with poor field position, converted a few third downs, gained 52 yards on a bubble screen to Allen Robinson, and ultimately was faced with a fourth down and inches in the red zone, but committed a false start penalty bringing on the field goal unit. The field goal was blocked, continuing Penn State's special teams woes, however their defense remained stout, forcing another punt, however on the Lions' ensuing drive, Hackenberg threw his first incomplete pass of the day, forcing a punt. In the waning minutes of the first quarter, the Badgers embarked on a drive in which they scored several first downs from both the running game and passing game. At the end of the quarter, they trailed 7–0, but were threatening, and a few minutes later, tied the game via a 4-yard pass from Joel Stave to tight end Brian Wozniak. Later in the quarter, Wisconsin converted a third down and 16 situation, and ultimately scored a touchdown on a pass from Stave to Jeff Duckworth. On their next drive, Penn State was set up in the red zone after a pass interference call in the end zone that broadcaster Ed Cunningham criticized, and a few plays later scored a touchdown via a 3-yard pass to Geno Lewis. Lewis was uncovered on the goal line play, and though Wisconsin coach Gary Andersen ran down the sideline signalling for a timeout, it was not granted, and the play stood. At the half, the score was tied at 14. After Wisconsin's opening drive stalled, the Nittany Lions embarked on a demoralizing drive that fostered widespread defensive confusion from Wisconsin and ultimately ended when Jesse James caught a 7-yard touchdown pass from Hackenberg to put Penn State on top 21–14. On the ensuing Wisconsin drive, Penn State freshman linebacker sacked Stave and forced a fumble that defensive end C. J. Olaniyan returned deep into Wisconsin territory. Penn State earned points, with Ficken redeeming himself on a 28-yard field goal to put Penn State up by 10 points. On the next two drives, each team went three-and-out. At the end of the third quarter, Wisconsin was near midfield during a drive in which they looked to pull within a field goal; at the end of the quarter, Penn State led 24–14. On one of the first plays of the fourth quarter, Trevor Williams intercepted Stave's pass, ending a scoring threat, and furthering the Nittany Lions' momentum. Penn State started their drive at their own 28-yard line, and had a third down and short, but a false start backed them up to a third and long; Hackenberg was unfazed, however, as he threw a 59-yard touchdown pass to Geno Lewis, putting Penn State up by three possessions, 31–14. Down three scores, Wisconsin desperately needed a touchdown, and tried to convert a fourth down and 23, but Penn State recorded a sack, and subsequently got the ball with 9:49 to play. They failed to execute, and about a minute later, punted the ball away. Wisconsin drove down the field and pulled within 10, 31–21, on a Wozniak reception, his second touchdown catch of the day. Penn State got the ball off an onside kick with good field position, and faced a third down and three, but Donovan Smith committed his fourth false start of the day, and Penn State had to throw the ball, and the pass was incomplete. Penn State's subsequent punt was blocked. On the ensuing drive, Jack Russell kicked a career long 48-yard field goal to pull Wisconsin within seven points. Penn State started their drive after Wisconsin kicked it deep inside their own 20-yard line. Penn State got some decent yardage on first down, but committed another false start, backing them up. Zwinak came through for the Lions, however, rushing on third-and-nine for 61 yards, his longest run of the season. From there, Penn State's drive stalled, and with 35 seconds left, Ficken attempted a 31-yard field goal, but missed, and Wisconsin consequently needed to drive the length of the field to score a touchdown, and they did get into Penn State territory, but ultimately, with nine seconds left, Stave threw the ball into the end zone, and Penn State safety Ryan Keiser came away with the interception for a touchback. Christian Hackenberg took a knee to end the game, and the Nittany Lions concluded their upset, winning 31–24.

"The Nittany Lions stepped into Camp Randall as a 24-point underdog, as a struggling team that had just 61 scholarship players and was was [sic] set to face the nation's No. 15 team. But these Nittany Lions have become accustomed to overcoming the odds, and they again shocked Wisconsin in a 31–24 upset."

— Josh Moyer, ESPN Penn State/Big Ten Reporter, November 30, 2013

20-year Big Ten Conference veteran Bill LeMonnier was the game's referee, his final game before retiring. LeMonnier was the referee for the 2011 BCS National Championship Game, and past recipient of the Golden Whistle Award, given by the National Association of Sports Officials. In the game, Penn State sent its seniors off by upsetting Wisconsin, ending the Badgers' hopes of playing in a BCS Bowl Game. Using the fact that they were 24-point underdogs as motivation, the Lions won the game by playing sound, fundamental football, not turning the ball over, while scoring two touchdowns subsequently off of Wisconsin interceptions. The game was Penn State's first road win in Big Ten conference play. After the game, to fulfill a bet, linebacker Glenn Carson cut the hair of offensive linemen (and roommates) Ty Howle and Adam Gress, both of whom had long hair that stuck out of their helmets that "bothered" Carson.

Penn State starting lineup

Offense
Position	Player	Class
LT	Donovan Smith	SO
LG	Miles Dieffenbach	JR
C	Ty Howle	SR
RG	John Urschel	SR
RT	Adam Gress	SR
TE	Adam Breneman	FR
QB	Christian Hackenberg	FR
RB	Zach Zwinak	JR
TE	Jesse James	SO
WR	Geno Lewis	FR
WR	Allen Robinson	JR

Defense
Position	Player	Class
DE	C. J. Olaniyan	JR
DT	DaQuan Jones	SR
DT	Kyle Baublitz	JR
DE	Deion Barnes	SO
OLB	Mike Hull	JR
MLB	Glenn Carson	SR
OLB	Brandon Bell	FR
CB	Adrian Amos	JR
S	Ryan Keiser	JR
S	Malcolm Willis	SR
CB	Jordan Lucas	SO

Special teams
Position	Player	Class
K	Sam Ficken	JR
P	Alex Butterworth	SR

== Statistics ==
=== Passing ===
Regular season
Player	ATT	COMP	YDS	COMP %	TD	INT	LONG	PASS EFF
Christian Hackenberg	392	231	2,955	58.9	20	10	68	134.0
Tyler Ferguson	15	10	155	66.7	1	0	65	175.5

Reference: Penn State Cumulative Season Statistics. Retrieved December 2, 2013.

=== Rushing ===
Regular season
Player	ATT	YDS	AVG	LONG	TD	AVG/G
Zach Zwinak	210	989	4.7	61	12	82.4
Bill Belton	157	803	5.1	51	5	73.0
Akeel Lynch	60	358	6.0	42	1	39.8
Allen Robinson	6	36	6.0	14	0	3.1
Christian Hackenberg	49	−68	−1.4	15	4	−5.7

Reference: Penn State Cumulative Season Statistics. Retrieved December 2, 2013.

=== Receiving ===
Regular season
Player	REC	YDS	AVG	LONG	TD	AVG/G
Allen Robinson	97	1432	14.8	65	6	119.3
Brandon Felder	28	312	11.1	29	3	26.0
Jesse James	25	333	13.3	58	3	27.8
Geno Lewis	18	234	13.0	59	3	19.5
Kyle Carter	18	222	12.3	29	1	18.5
Adam Breneman	15	186	12.4	68	3	16.9
Bill Belton	15	158	10.5	30	2	14.4
Richy Anderson	13	111	8.5	15	0	10.1

Reference: Penn State Cumulative Season Statistics. Retrieved December 2, 2013.

=== Kicking ===
Regular season
Player	XPM	XPA	FGM	FGA	FG%	LONG	PTS
Sam Ficken	41	42	15	23	65.2%	54	86

Reference: Penn State Nittany Lions 2013 Statistics – Team and Player Stats – ESPN. Retrieved December 2, 2013.

=== Punting ===
Regular season
Player	NO.	YDS.	AVG	LONG	TB	I 20
Alex Butterworth	51	2,000	39.2	66	4	17
Christian Hackenberg	2	85	42.5	43	1	1

Reference: Penn State Cumulative Season Statistics. Retrieved December 2, 2013.

=== Defense ===
Regular season
Player	SOLO	AST	TCK	TFL	SCK	INT	DEF	FF	FR
Glenn Carson	43	47	90	4	1	0	3	0	0
Mike Hull	44	34	78	4.5	0.5	0	2	1	1
Jordan Lucas	45	20	65	4.5	1	3	16	2	0
Malcolm Willis	40	21	61	1	0	1	2	1	0
DaQuan Jones	33	23	56	11.5	3	0	0	0	1
C. J. Olaniyan	28	22	50	11	5	1	3	3	1
Adrian Amos	32	18	50	4	2.5	1	6	0	0
Ryan Keiser	26	12	38	2	1	3	11	0	0
Stephen Obeng-Agyapong	20	14	34	2	1	1	1	1	1
Nyeem Wartman	17	15	32	2.5	1	0	4	1	0
Deion Barnes	12	16	28	4	2	0	2	1	0
Austin Johnson	14	13	27	3	1	0	0	0	1
Brandon Bell	14	10	24	0	0	0	0	1	0
Trevor Williams (American football)	17	7	24	0	0	2	10	0	0
Kyle Baublitz	14	9	23	3	3	0	1	0	0
Jesse Della Valle	13	8	21	0	0	0	1	0	0
Ben Kline	9	9	18	1.5	1	0	0	0	0
Anthony Zettel	11	5	16	6	4	1	3	0	0
Carl Nassib	11	1	12	2	1	0	1	1	0

Reference: Penn State Cumulative Season Statistics. Retrieved December 3, 2013.

== Rankings ==
Ranking movements Legend: ██ Increase in ranking ██ Decrease in ranking — = Not ranked RV = Received votes
	Week																
Poll	Pre	1	2	3	4	5	6	7	8	9	10	11	12	13	14	15	Final
AP	RV	RV	RV	—	—	—	—	—	—	—	—	—	—	—	—	—	—
Coaches	—	—	—	—	—	—	—	—	—	—	—	—	—	—	—	—	—
Harris	Not released							—	—	—	—	—	—	—	—	—	Not released
BCS	Not released								—	—	—	—	—	—	—	—	Not released

== Awards ==
- Allen Robinson – Richter-Howard Receiver of the Year Award (second consecutive year), First-team All-Big Ten (media and coaches), First team All-American (Sporting News)
- John Urschel – First-team All-Big Ten (media and coaches) Academic All-American (second time, just the 11th Penn State player to be named an Academic All-American twice), William V. Campbell Trophy (the "academic Heisman")
- DaQuan Jones – First-team All-Big Ten (coaches), Second-team All-Big Ten (media)
- Adrian Amos – Honorable Mention All-Big Ten (coaches)
- Glenn Carson – Honorable Mention All-Big Ten (coaches and media)
- Sam Ficken – Honorable Mention All-Big Ten (media)
- Christian Hackenberg – Honorable Mention All-Big Ten (coaches and media), Thompson-Randle El Freshman of the Year
- Ty Howle – Honorable Mention All-Big Ten (coaches and media)
- Jesse James – Honorable Mention All-Big Ten (media)
- Jordan Lucas – Honorable Mention All-Big Ten (coaches and media)
- C. J. Olaniyan – Honorable Mention All-Big Ten (coaches and media)
- Donovan Smith – Honorable Mention All-Big Ten (coaches and media)

== Post-season ==
Less than a week after the season's conclusion, backup quarterback Tyler Ferguson announced his plans to transfer from the university to somewhere he would have an opportunity to start, rather than be Christian Hackenberg's backup for the remainder of his career. Later, it was announced that though he originally intended to transfer to Western Kentucky (WKU), at which Bobby Petrino was head coach; when Petrino accepted the head coaching position at Louisville, Ferguson changed his plans, and transferred there. In early December, it was reported that quarterbacks coach Charlie Fisher and linebackers coach Ron Vanderlinden, the latter of whom was a holdover from the Joe Paterno era, departed, with speculation that they were forced out by Bill O'Brien.

=== Departure of Bill O'Brien ===
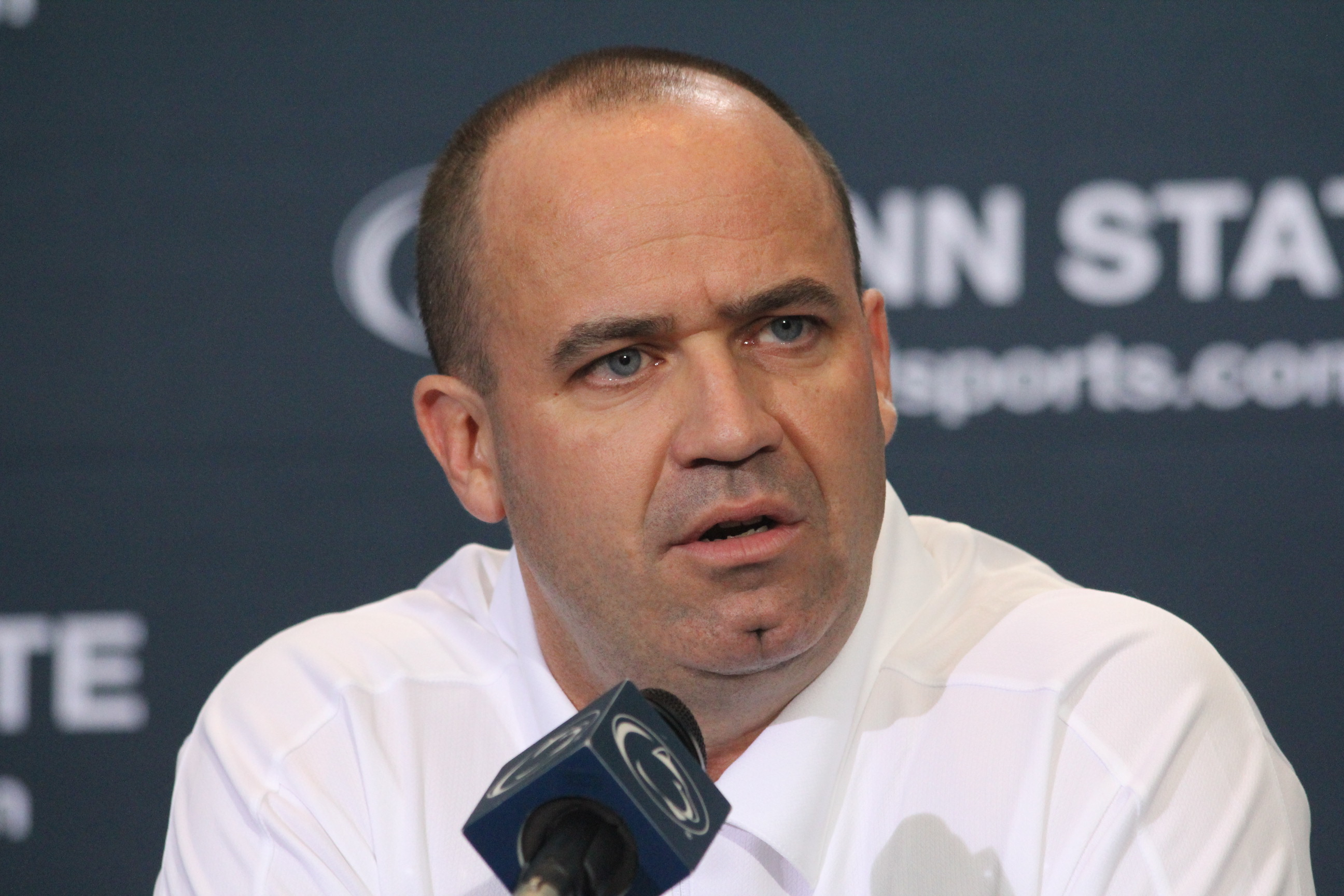
O'Brien in April 2012

Several weeks after the departure of those assistants, reports began to surface that O'Brien had interviewed for the Houston Texans' head coaching position to replace Gary Kubiak, who was fired late in the season. Subsequently, the two sides were reported to be negotiating a contract, and on January 3, 2014, the Texans held a press conference announcing O'Brien as their new head coach. Assistant head coach and wide receivers coach Stan Hixon, safeties coach Anthony Midget, defensive coordinator John Butler, running backs coach Charles London, and strength coach Craig Fitzgerald submitted resignations on January 6, and most were expected to follow O'Brien to the NFL, leaving only offensive line coach Mac McWhorter, who was 63 years old and came out of retirement to coach at Penn State, defensive line coach Larry Johnson, a long-time member of the staff, and tight ends coach John Strollo, as assistant coaches on the staff, and thus making Penn State more attractive of a coaching position to a new coach, as he could bring in his own staff.

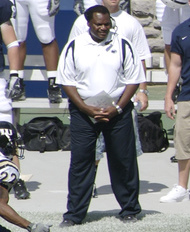
Defensive line coach and interim coach Larry Johnson was a candidate for the head coaching position, but ultimately was not hired

Early candidates for the job included former Rutgers and Tampa Bay Buccaneers head coach Greg Schiano, Penn State alumni Al Golden, who was the coach of the Miami and Mike Munchak, who was the coach of the Tennessee Titans prior to his dismissal, and Pennsylvania native James Franklin, Vanderbilt's head coach, as well as Larry Johnson, Penn State's defensive line coach. In the ensuing days, ESPN reported that the search committee, led by athletic director David Joyner, targeted Munchak, Franklin, and Golden as its top three candidates, but that Johnson remained in the mix. On Sunday, January 5, 2014, Golden took himself out of contention for the position, while Munchak appeared to be an emerging strong candidate. Over the next few days, however, Franklin emerged as the top candidate, and on January 11, he was officially named and introduced as Penn State's head coach. Upon his hiring, questions began to surface about whether he would retain Johnson or bring back Vanderlinden, the latter of whom was Maryland's head coach when Franklin was on its staff in 2000, to the staff; unlike when O'Brien was hired and announced that he would retain the pair at his introductory press conference, Franklin simply noted that he would meet with the pair, but commented that he is "fiercely loyal" to his assistants from Vanderbilt, and intended to bring many with him to Penn State. Ultimately, neither Johnson nor Vanderlinden were on Franklin's staff for the 2014 season, with the former accepting a position with rival Ohio State.

Intermittently, Penn State named Johnson, the lone remaining holdover from the Joe Paterno era, the interim head coach in an effort to stabilize the program to prevent recruit defection, as well as prevent current players, namely quarterback Hackenberg, whose father commented that he was undecided on whether or not to return, from transferring. A few weeks later, however, it appeared Hackenberg would return, as Ferguson followed through on his plans to transfer, and Franklin lauded Hackenberg in his introductory press conference. After the announcement of O'Brien's departure, star wide receiver Allen Robinson, a junior, declared that he would forgo his senior season, and enter the 2014 NFL draft; according to projections from a CBSSports.com mock draft, Robinson would likely be selected in the late first round.

=== Draft prospects ===
Three players were invited to the 2014 NFL Scouting Combine, held February 22–25, 2014, at Lucas Oil Stadium in Indianapolis, Indiana: DaQuan Jones, Allen Robinson, and John Urschel.

=== All-star games ===
Game	Date	Site	Players
2014 East-West Shrine Game	January 18, 2014	Tropicana Field; St. Petersburg, Florida	Stephen Obeng-Agyapong, Glenn Carson, John Urschel
2014 Senior Bowl	January 25, 2013	Ladd–Peebles Stadium, Mobile, Alabama	DaQuan Jones
