= Strollo =

Strollo is a surname. Notable people with the surname include:

- Anthony Strollo (1899–1962), New York mobster
- John Strollo (born 1954), American football coach
