= Glenn Carson =

American football player (born 1990)

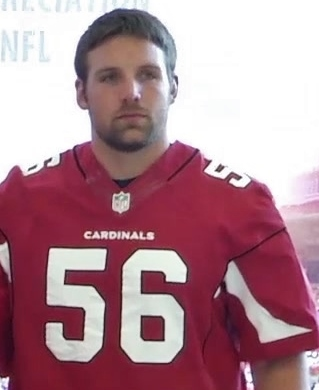
- Carson with the Arizona Cardinals

No. 56
- Position: Linebacker

Personal information
- Born: December 5, 1990 (age 35); Manahawkin, New Jersey, U.S.
- Listed height: 6 ft 3 in (1.91 m)
- Listed weight: 235 lb (107 kg)

Career information
- High school: Southern Regional (Manahawkin)
- College: Penn State
- NFL draft: 2014: undrafted

Career history
- Arizona Cardinals (2014); New York Giants (2015)*
- * Offseason or practice squad member only

Career NFL statistics
- Total tackles: 11
- Stats at Pro Football Reference

Glenn Andrew Carson, Jr. (born December 5, 1990) is an American former professional football player who was a linebacker in the National Football League (NFL). He played college football for the Penn State Nittany Lions.

== High school and college career ==
Raised in the Manahawkin section of Stafford Township, New Jersey, Carson played prep football at Southern Regional High School, graduating in 2009. Carson enrolled full-time at Penn State University in January 2010 and played in his true freshman season with the Nittany Lions in fall 2010. Early in his career, Carson was overshadowed by other linebackers, including Michael Mauti, Gerald Hodges, and Nate Stupar. During his senior season, Carson anchored the Nittany Lions' linebacking corps, on September 21, 2013 making his 28th career start, most on the team.

== Professional career ==
=== Arizona Cardinals ===
On May 12, 2014, Carson was signed by the Arizona Cardinals as an undrafted free agent. On August 31, 2015, he was cut by the Cardinals.

=== New York Giants ===
On December 30, 2015, the New York Giants signed Carson to their practice squad.
