= Will Lawing =

American football coach

Chicago Bears
- Title: Offensive analyst

Personal information
- Born: November 27, 1985 (age 40); Boone, North Carolina, U.S.
- Listed height: 5 ft 9 in (1.75 m)
- Listed weight: 180 lb (82 kg)

Career information
- Position: Wide receiver (No. 19, 20)
- High school: Lexington (SC)
- College: North Carolina (2004–2007)

Career history
- Juniata (2009–2012); Tight ends coach (2009); Passing game coordinator (2010); Offensive coordinator (2011–2012); Penn State (2013) Graduate assistant; Houston Texans (2014–2020); Defensive quality control coach (2014–2016); Offensive analyst (2017–2018); Tight ends coach (2019–2020); Alabama (2021–2022) Offensive analyst; New England Patriots (2023) Tight ends coach; Boston College (2024–2025) Offensive coordinator & tight ends coach; Chicago Bears (2026–present) Offensive analyst

William Bradley Lawing (born November 27, 1985) is an American football coach who is an offensive analyst for the Chicago Bears of the National Football League. He previously served as an assistant coach at Penn State University and Juniata College. Lawing served with Bill O'Brien in various assistant coaching roles since 2014, including roles with the Houston Texans, Alabama Crimson Tide, New England Patriots, and Boston College Eagles.

== Playing career ==
Lawing played college football for the North Carolina Tar Heels, walking on to the team before the 2004 season as a wide receiver.

== Coaching career ==
=== Houston Texans ===
Starting in 2014, Lawing spent three years as defensive quality control coach for head coach Bill O' Brien and the Houston Texans. He served as an offensive line assistant in 2017 and 2018. On February 5, 2019, Lawing was named the tight ends coach of the Houston Texans.

=== Alabama ===
After the Texans coaching change before the 2021 season, Lawing followed Bill O'Brien to Alabama to work under Nick Saban as an analyst.

=== New England Patriots ===
On February 2, 2023, Lawing once again followed O'Brien, being hired by the New England Patriots as the team's tight ends coach.

=== Boston College ===
On February 12, 2024, Lawing was hired by Boston College as the offensive coordinator the week after O'Brien accepted the head coaching role.

=== Chicago Bears ===
Lawing was hired by the Chicago Bears as an offensive analyst on February 18, 2026.

== Personal life ==
His father Brad was a longtime college assistant coach. He worked as North Carolina's defensive ends coach and recruiting coordinator while his son was playing for the school.
