= John Strollo =

American football player and coach (born 1954)

Biographical details
- Born: January 20, 1954 (age 72); Long Branch, New Jersey, U.S.

Playing career
- 1974: Boston College
- Position: Offensive tackle

Coaching career (HC unless noted)
- 1977–1979: Middletown HS South (NJ) (assistant)
- 1980: Springfield (GA)
- 1981–1982: Northeastern (assistant)
- 1983: Washburn (assistant)
- 1984: Northeastern (OL)
- 1985–1990: Northeastern (OC/OL)
- 1991–1995: UMass (OL)
- 1996–2000: Lafayette (OL)
- 2001–2003: Cornell (OC/OL)
- 2004: Maine (assistant)
- 2005–2007: Duke (assistant)
- 2008: Elon (TE)
- 2009–2010: Elon (OL)
- 2011: Ball State (OL)
- 2012–2013: Penn State (TE)
- 2014–2016: Ball State (assistant)
- 2017: Louisburg (OL)

John Strollo (born January 20, 1954) is an American football coach who has worked 14 different assignments over his coaching career, which has spanned over 35 years, both at the high school and collegiate level. After serving two seasons as tight ends coach at Penn State, he returned to Ball State to become the offensive line coach for the 2014 season.

== Early life and playing career ==
Raised in Long Branch, New Jersey Strollo attended Long Branch High School.

Strollo lettered once while playing football at Boston College, and graduated in 1976, after which he got his master's degree in 1980 at Springfield College.

== Coaching career ==
Strollo began coaching directly out of college as an assistant coach at Middletown High School South on the Jersey Shore, prior to moving to the collegiate level to Springfield, at which he got his master's degree working as a graduate assistant. From there, he had his first stint at Northeastern University, Washburn University, and his second stint at Northeastern before being hired to assistant coach at Massachusetts. He had three more coaching stops – Lafayette College, Cornell, and Maine – before first working with Bill O'Brien when they were assistants together at Duke from 2005 to 2007. He then spent three seasons at Elon and one season at Ball State prior to O'Brien hiring him to coach on his new staff at Penn State, a decision that drew some criticism within the media for his lack of experience in big-time college football. His first season at Penn State, however, saw freshman tight end Kyle Carter excel, and Strollo consequently received some accolade and acceptance for his role as position coach, including speculation that Penn State could become "Tight End U", a reference to Penn State's Linebacker U, for their consistent success and strength at linebacker. He considers coaching at Penn State a "dream job".

When Bill O'Brien left Penn State to go to the Houston Texans, Strollo did not go with him, nor did new coach James Franklin retain him on the staff at Penn State. Consequently, Strollo returned to Ball State as offensive line coach.
