= Penn State Nittany Lions football statistical leaders =

The Penn State Nittany Lions football statistical leaders are statistical leaders of the Penn State Nittany Lions football program in various categories, including passing, rushing, receiving, total offense, defensive stats, kicking and overall team performance. Within those areas, the lists identify single-game, single-season, career leaders and all time records. The Nittany Lions represent Pennsylvania State University in the NCAA's Big Ten Conference.

Although Penn State began competing in intercollegiate football in 1887, the school's official record book considers the "modern era" to have begun in 1970. Records from before this year are often incomplete and inconsistent, and they are generally not included in these lists.

These lists are dominated by more recent players for several reasons:

- Since 1970, seasons have increased from 10 games to 11 and then 12 games in length.
- The NCAA didn't allow freshmen to play varsity football until 1972 (with the exception of the World War II years), allowing players to have four-year careers.
- Bowl games only began counting toward single-season and career statistics in 2002, allowing players in most seasons since then an extra game to accumulate statistics.
- The Nittany Lions played in the 2016 Big Ten Football Championship Game, giving players in that season yet another game to amass statistics.
- Starting in 2018 a redshirted player was allowed to play in up to 4 games in a season and still maintain their status allowing players to gain an extra season of statistics.
- Due to COVID-19 issues, the NCAA ruled that the 2020 season would not count against the athletic eligibility of any football player, giving everyone who played in that season the opportunity for five years of eligibility instead of the normal four.

== Passing ==
=== Passing yards ===
Career
Rank	Player	Yards	Years
1	Sean Clifford	10,661	2018 2019 2020 2021 2022
2	Trace McSorley	9,899	2015 2016 2017 2018
3	Christian Hackenberg	8,427	2013 2014 2015
4	Drew Allar	7,402	2022 2023 2024 2025
5	Zack Mills	7,212	2001 2002 2003 2004
6	Matt McGloin	6,390	2009 2010 2011 2012
7	Tony Sacca	5,869	1988 1989 1990 1991
8	Daryll Clark	5,742	2006 2007 2008 2009
9	Chuck Fusina	5,382	1975 1976 1977 1978
10	Kerry Collins	5,304	1991 1992 1993 1994

Single season
Rank	Player	Yards	Year
1	Trace McSorley	3,614	2016
2	Trace McSorley	3,570	2017
3	Drew Allar	3,327	2024
4	Matt McGloin	3,271	2012
5	Sean Clifford	3,107	2021
6	Daryll Clark	3,003	2009
7	Christian Hackenberg	2,977	2014
8	Christian Hackenberg	2,955	2013
9	Sean Clifford	2,882	2022
10	Kerry Collins	2,679	1994

Single game
Rank	Player	Yards	Year	Opponent
1	Christian Hackenberg	454	2014	UCF (Croke Park Classic)
2	Sean Clifford	401	2021	Villanova
3	Zack Mills	399	2002	Iowa
4	Sean Clifford	398	2019	Maryland
5	Matt McGloin	395	2012	Indiana
6	Drew Allar	391	2024	USC
7	Trace McSorley	384	2016	Wisconsin (B10 CG)
8	Trace McSorley	381	2017	Michigan State
9	Michael Robinson	379	2003	Wisconsin
10	Trace McSorley	376	2016	Michigan State

=== Passing touchdowns ===
Career
Rank	Player	TDs	Years
1	Sean Clifford	86	2018 2019 2020 2021 2022
2	Trace McSorley	77	2015 2016 2017 2018
3	Drew Allar	61	2022 2023 2024 2025
4	Christian Hackenberg	48	2013 2014 2015
5	Matt McGloin	46	2009 2010 2011 2012
6	Daryll Clark	43	2006 2007 2008 2009
7	Todd Blackledge	41	1980 1981 1982
	Tony Sacca	41	1988 1989 1990 1991
	Zack Mills	41	2001 2002 2003 2004
10	Kerry Collins	39	1991 1992 1993 1994

Single season
Rank	Player	TDs	Year
1	Trace McSorley	29	2016
2	Trace McSorley	28	2017
3	Drew Allar	25	2023
4	Daryll Clark	24	2009
	Matt McGloin	24	2012
	Sean Clifford	24	2022
	Drew Allar	24	2024
8	Sean Clifford	23	2019
9	Todd Blackledge	22	1982
10	Tony Sacca	21	1991
	Kerry Collins	21	1994
	Sean Clifford	21	2021

Single game
Rank	Player	TDs	Year	Opponent
1	Tony Sacca	5	1991	Georgia Tech
	Rashard Casey	5	2000	Louisiana Tech
3	Tom Sherman	4	1967	Pittsburgh
	Chuck Fusina	4	1978	Syracuse
	Zack Mills	4	2002	Iowa
	Anthony Morelli	4	2007	Buffalo
	Daryll Clark	4	2008	Michigan State
	Daryll Clark	4	2009	Michigan Michigan State
	Matt McGloin	4	2012	Indiana
	Christian Hackenberg	4	2013	Wisconsin
	Christian Hackenberg	4	2014	Boston College (Pinstripe Bowl)
	Trace McSorley	4	2016	Michigan State Wisconsin (B1G 10 CG)
	Trace McSorley	4	2016	USC (Rose Bowl)
	Trace McSorley	4	2017	Georgia State
	Sean Clifford	4	2019	Michigan State
	Sean Clifford	4	2021	Villanova
	Sean Clifford	4	2022	Purdue
	Sean Clifford	4	2022	Minnesota
	Sean Clifford	4	2022	Michigan State
	Drew Allar	4	2023	Iowa
	Drew Allar	4	2023	Maryland
	Rocco Becht	4	2026	Marshall

=== Passing attempts ===
Career
Rk	Player	Attempts	Years
1	Sean Clifford	1,356	2018 2019 2020 2021 2022
2	Christian Hackenberg	1,235	2013 2014 2015
3	Trace McSorley	1,215	2015 2016 2017 2018
4	Zach Mills	1,082	2001 2002 2003 2004
5	Drew Allar	1,002	2022 2023 2024 2025
6	Matt McGloin	894	2009 2010 2011 2012
7	Tony Sacca	824	1988 1989 1990 1991
8	Anthony Morelli	821	2004 2005 2006 2007
9	Daryll Clark	738	2006 2007 2008 2009
10	Wally Richardson	692	1992 1993 1994 1995 1996

Single Season
Rk	Player	Attempts	Year
1	Christian Hackenberg	484	2014
2	Matt McGloin	446	2012
3	Sean Clifford	428	2021
4	Trace McSorley	427	2017
5	Anthony Morelli	402	2007
6	Drew Allar	394	2024
7	Christian Hackenberg	392	2013
8	Drew Allar	389	2023
9	Trace McSorley	387	2016
10	Anthony Morelli	386	2006

Single Game
Rk	Player	Attempts	Year	Opponent
1	Sean Clifford	57	2020	Maryland
2	Christian Hackenberg	55	2013	Indiana
3	Sean Clifford	52	2021	Ohio State
4	Rashard Casey	51	2000	Iowa
	Matt McGloin	51	2012	Northwestern
6	Christian Hackenberg	50	2014	Boston College (Pinstripe Bowl)
7	Zach Mills	49	2004	Purdue
	Christian Hackenberg	49	2014	Ohio State
9	Matt McGloin	48	2012	Ohio
	Trace McSorley	48	2017	Iowa

=== Passing completions ===
Career
Rk	Player	Completions	Years
1	Sean Clifford	833	2018 2019 2020 2021 2022
2	Trace McSorley	720	2015 2016 2017 2018
3	Christian Hackenberg	693	2013 2014 2015
4	Drew Allar	633	2022 2023 2024 2025
5	Zach Mills	606	2001 2002 2003 2004
6	Matt McGloin	513	2009 2010 2011 2012
7	Anthony Morelli	460	2004 2005 2006 2007
8	Daryll Clark	444	2006 2007 2008 2009
9	Tony Sacca	401	1988 1989 1990 1991
10	Wally Richardson	378	1992 1993 1994 1995 1996

Single Season
Rk	Player	Completions	Year
1	Trace McSorley	284	2017
2	Matt McGloin	270	2012
	Christian Hackenberg	270	2014
4	Drew Allar	262	2024
5	Sean Clifford	261	2021
6	Anthony Morelli	234	2007
7	Drew Allar	233	2023
8	Daryll Clark	232	2009
9	Christian Hackenberg	231	2013
10	Sean Clifford	226	2022

Single Game
Rk	Player	Completions	Year	Opponent
1	Matt McGloin	35	2012	Northwestern
	Sean Clifford	35	2021	Ohio State
3	Christian Hackenberg	34	2014	Boston College (Pinstripe Bowl)
4	Christian Hackenberg	32	2014	UCF
	Trace McSorley	32	2017	Washington (Fiesta Bowl)
	Sean Clifford	32	2022	Ohio State
7	Christian Hackenberg	31	2014	Ohio State
8	Christian Hackenberg	30	2013	Indiana
	Drew Allar	30	2024	USC

=== Passing completion percentage ===
- Minimum of 100 attempts for career

Career
Rk	Player	Completion %	Years
1	Ethan Grunkemeyer	68.9%	2024 2025
2	Drew Allar	63.2%	2022 2023 2024 2025
3	Sean Clifford	61.4%	2018 2019 2020 2021 2022
4	Daryll Clark	60.2%	2006 2007 2008 2009
5	Will Levis	59.8%	2019 2020
6	Trace McSorley	59.3%	2015 2016 2017 2018
7	Matt McGloin	57.4%	2009 2010 2011 2012
8	Kerry Collins	56.3%	1991 1992 1993 1994
9	Christian Hackenberg	56.1%	2013 2014 2015
10	Zack Mills	56.0%	2001 2002 2003 2004
	Anthony Morelli	56.0%	2004 2005 2006 2007

=== Interceptions ===
Career
Rank	Player	Ints	Years
1	Todd Blackledge	41	1980 1981 1982
2	Zack Mills	39	2001 2002 2003 2004
3	Chuck Fusina	32	1975 1976 1977 1978
4	Christian Hackenberg	31	2013 2014 2015
	Sean Clifford	31	2018 2019 2020 2021 2022
6	Trace McSorley	25	2015 2016 2017 2018
7	John Shaffer	24	1983 1984 1985 1986
	Tony Sacca	24	1988 1989 1990 1991
9	Tony Rados	23	1951 1952 1953
10	Kerry Collins	21	1991 1992 1993 1994
	Michael Robinson	21	2002 2004 2004 2005

Single season
Rank	Player	Ints	Year
1	Christian Hackenberg	15	2014
2	Jack White	14	1965
	Todd Blackledge	14	1981
	Todd Blackledge	14	1982
5	Todd Blackledge	13	1980
6	Chuck Fusina	12	1978
	Zack Mills	12	2001
	Zack Mills	12	2004
9	Kerry Collins	11	1993

=== Longest touchdown pass ===
Career
Rk	Passer	Receiver	Yards	Year	Opponent
1	Sean Clifford	Daniel George	95	2018	Kent State
2	Trace McSorley	K. J. Hamler	93	2018	Ohio State
3	Harold Hess	Bob Higgins	92	1919	Pittsburgh
4	Sean Clifford	KeAndre Lambert-Smith	88	2022	Utah (Rose Bowl)
5	Steve Joachim	Jim Scott	86	1971	Navy
	Sean Clifford	Jahan Dotson	86	2021	Maryland
7	Trace McSorley	Saquon Barkley	85	2017	Georgia State
8	Sean Clifford	KeAndre Lambert-Smith	83	2021	Villanova
9	Matt Knizner	Eric Hamilton	82	1982	Pittsburgh
	Matt Knizner	Eric Hamilton	82	1986	Pittsburgh
	Kerry Collins	Freddie Scott	82	1994	Rutgers

== Rushing ==
=== Rushing yards ===
Career
Rank	Player	Yards	Years
1	Kaytron Allen	4,180	2022 2023 2024 2025
2	Evan Royster	3,932	2007 2008 2009 2010
3	Saquon Barkley	3,843	2015 2016 2017
4	Nicholas Singleton	3,461	2022 2023 2024 2025
5	Curt Warner	3,398	1979 1980 1981 1982
6	Tony Hunt	3,320	2003 2004 2005 2006
7	Blair Thomas	3,301	1986 1987 1988 1989
8	Curtis Enis	3,256	1995 1996 1997
9	DJ Dozier	3,227	1983 1984 1985 1986
10	Larry Johnson	2,953	2000 2001 2002

Single season
Rank	Player	Yards	Year
1	Larry Johnson	2,087	2002
2	Lydell Mitchell	1,567	1971
3	Ki-Jana Carter	1,539	1994
4	John Cappelletti	1,522	1973
5	Saquon Barkley	1,496	2016
6	James Ward	1,414	2004
7	Tony Hunt	1,386	2006
8	Curtis Enis	1,363	1997
9	Blair Thomas	1,341	1989
10	Rodney Kinlaw	1,329	2007

Single game
Rank	Player	Yards	Year	Opponent
1	Larry Johnson	327	2002	Indiana
2	Larry Johnson	279	2002	Illinois
	Larry Johnson	279	2002	Michigan State
4	Larry Johnson	257	2002	Northwestern
5	Curt Warner	256	1981	Syracuse
6	Shorty Miller	250	1913	Carnegie Tech
7	Bob Pollard	243	1951	Rutgers
8	Curtis Enis	241	1996	USC (Kickoff Classic)
9	Bob Campbell	239	1968	Syracuse
10	Curt Warner	238	1981	Nebraska

=== Rushing touchdowns ===
Career
Rank	Player	TDs	Years
1	Nicholas Singleton	45	2022 2023 2024 2025
2	Saquon Barkley	43	2015 2016 2017
3	Kaytron Allen	39	2022 2023 2024 2025
4	Lydell Mitchell	38	1969 1970 1971
5	Curtis Enis	36	1995 1996 1997
6	Ki-Jana Carter	34	1992 1993 1994
7	Charlie Pittman	30	1967 1968 1969
8	Trace McSorley	30	2015 2016 2017 2018
9	John Cappelletti	29	1972 1973
	Richie Anderson	29	1991 1992
	Evan Royster	29	2007 2008 2009 2010

Single season
Rank	Player	TDs	Year
1	Lydell Mitchell	26	1971
2	Ki-Jana Carter	23	1994
3	Larry Johnson	20	2002
4	Curtis Enis	19	1997
5	Richie Anderson	18	1992
	Saquon Barkley	18	2016
	Saquon Barkley	18	2017
8	John Cappelletti	17	1973
9	Kaytron Allen	15	2025
10	Charlie Pittman	14	1968

Single game
Rank	Player	TDs	Year	Opponent
1	Harry Robb	6	1917	Gettysburg
2	Shorty Miller	5	1913	Carnegie Tech
	Lydell Mitchell	5	1971	Maryland
	Ki-Jana Carter	5	1994	Michigan State
5	Franco Harris	4	1971	Iowa
	Lydell Mitchell	4	1971	Navy
	Lydell Mitchell	4	1971	TCU
	Lydell Mitchell	4	1971	North Carolina State
	John Cappelletti	4	1973	West Virginia
	John Cappelletti	4	1973	Ohio
	Brian O'Neal	4	1992	Pittsburgh
	Larry Johnson	4	2002	Indiana
	Larry Johnson	4	2002	Michigan State
	Saquon Barkley	4	2016	Pittsburgh

=== Longest rushing plays ===
All Time
Rk	Player	Yards	Year	Opponent
1	Blair Thomas	92	1986	Syracuse
	Bill Belton	92	2014	Indiana
	Saquon Barkley	92	2017	Washington (Fiesta Bowl)
4	Nicholas Singleton	87	2022	Utah (Rose Bowl)
5	Chafie Fields	84	1997	Texas
6	Ki-Jana Carter	83	1995	Oregon
7	Devyn Ford	81	2019	Idaho
8	Saquon Barkley	79	2016	USC (Rose Bowl)
9	Corey Smith	78	2024	Washington
10	Nicholas Singleton	70	2022	Ohio

== Receiving ==
=== Receptions ===
Career
Rank	Player	Rec	Years
1	DaeSean Hamilton	214	2014 2015 2016 2017
2	Jahan Dotson	183	2018 2019 2020 2021
3	Deon Butler	179	2005 2006 2007 2008
4	Allen Robinson	177	2011 2012 2013
5	Bobby Engram	167	1993 1994 1995 1996
6	Derrick Williams	161	2005 2006 2007 2008
7	Jordan Norwood	158	2005 2006 2007 2008
8	Chris Godwin	154	2014 2015 2016
9	Tyler Warren	153	2021 2022 2023 2024
10	Parker Washington	146	2020 2021 2022

Single season
Rank	Player	Rec	Year
1	Tyler Warren	104	2024
2	Allen Robinson	97	2013
3	Jahan Dotson	91	2021
4	DaeSean Hamilton	82	2014
5	Allen Robinson	77	2012
6	Chris Godwin	69	2015
7	Parker Washington	64	2021
8	O. J. McDuffie	63	1992
9	Bobby Engram	63	1995
10	Chris Godwin	59	2016

Single game
Rank	Player	Rec	Year	Opponent
1	Tyler Warren	17	2024	USC
2	DaeSean Hamilton	14	2014	Ohio State
3	Freddie Scott	13	1995	Wisconsin
4	Allen Robinson	12	2013	Indiana
	Allen Robinson	12	2013	Ohio State
	Saquon Barkley	12	2017	Iowa
7	O. J. McDuffie	11	1992	Boston College
	Deon Butler	11	2006	Northwestern
	Allen Robinson	11	2013	Illinois
	Chris Godwin	11	2015	Michigan State
	Jahan Dotson	11	2021	Ohio State
	Jahan Dotson	11	2021	Maryland
	Parker Washington	11	2022	Ohio State
	Chase Sowell	11	2026	Michigan

=== Receiving yards ===
Career
Rank	Player	Yards	Years
1	Bobby Engram	3,026	1993 1994 1995
2	DaeSean Hamilton	2,842	2014 2015 2016 2017
3	Deon Butler	2,771	2005 2006 2007 2008
4	Jahan Dotson	2,757	2018 2019 2020 2021
5	Allen Robinson	2,474	2011 2012 2013
6	Chris Godwin	2,421	2014 2015 2016
7	Derek Moye	2,395	2008 2009 2010 2011
8	Jordan Norwood	2,015	2005 2006 2007 2008
9	Bryant Johnson	2,008	2000 2001 2002
10	Kenny Jackson	2,006	1980 1981 1982 1983

Single season
Rank	Player	Yards	Year
1	Allen Robinson	1,432	2013
2	Tyler Warren	1,233	2024
3	Jahan Dotson	1,182	2021
4	Chris Godwin	1,101	2015
5	Bobby Engram	1,084	1995
6	Bobby Engram	1,029	1994
7	Allen Robinson	1,018	2012
8	Chris Godwin	982	2016
9	O. J. McDuffie	977	1992
10	Freddie Scott	973	1994

Single game
Rank	Player	Yards	Year	Opponent
1	Jahan Dotson	242	2021	Maryland
2	Tyler Warren	224	2024	USC
3	Deon Butler	216	2006	Northwestern
4	O. J. McDuffie	212	1992	Boston College
5	Bobby Engram	203	1995	Purdue
6	Bobby Engram	200	1994	Rutgers
7	Allen Robinson	197	2012	Indiana
8	Jahan Dotson	189	2020	Illinois
9	Chris Godwin	187	2016	USC (Rose Bowl)
10	Parker Washington	179	2022	Ohio State

=== Receiving touchdowns ===
Career
Rank	Player	TDs	Years
1	Bobby Engram	31	1993 1994 1995
2	Kenny Jackson	25	1980 1981 1982 1983
	Jahan Dotson	25	2018 2019 2020 2021
4	Deon Butler	22	2005 2006 2007 2008
5	Tyler Warren	19	2021 2022 2023 2024
6	Derek Moye	18	2008 2009 2010 2011
	Chris Godwin	18	2014 2015 2016
	DaeSean Hamilton	18	2014 2015 2016 2017
9	Allen Robinson	17	2011 2012 2013
10	O. J. McDuffie	16	1988 1989 1990 1991 1992
	Pat Freiermuth	16	2018 2019 2020

Single season
Rank	Player	TDs	Year
1	Bobby Engram	13	1993
2	Jahan Dotson	12	2021
3	Bobby Engram	11	1995
	Allen Robinson	11	2012
	Chris Godwin	11	2016
6	Joe Jurevicius	10	1997
7	O. J. McDuffie	9	1992
	Freddie Scott	9	1994
	Deon Butler	9	2005
	Mike Gesicki	9*	2017
	DaeSean Hamilton	9	2017

Single game
Rank	Player	TDs	Year	Opponent
1	Bobby Engram	4	1993	Minnesota
2	Freddie Scott	3	1994	Temple
	Bobby Engram	3	1995	Rutgers
	Joe Jurevicius	3	1997	Louisville
	Deon Butler	3	2008	Michigan State
	Allen Robinson	3	2012	Navy
	Allen Robinson	3	2012	Indiana
	DaeSean Hamilton	3	2017	Indiana
	Pat Freiermuth	3	2019	Michigan State
	Jahan Dotson	3	2020	Ohio State
	Jahan Dotson	3	2021	Maryland

=== Longest touchdown reception ===
All-Time
Rank	Receiver	Passer	Yards	Year	Opponent
1	Daniel George	Sean Clifford	95	2018	Kent State
2	K. J. Hamler	Trace McSorley	93	2018	Ohio State
3	Bob Higgins	Bill Hess	92	1919	Pittsburgh
4	KeAndre Lambert-Smith	Sean Clifford	88	2022	Utah (Rose Bowl)
5	Jim Scott	Steve Joachim	86	1971	Navy
	Jahan Dotson	Sean Clifford	86	2021	Maryland
7	Saquon Barkley	Trace McSorley	85	2017	Georgia State
8	Sean Clifford	KeAndre Lambert-Smith	83	2021	Villanova
9	Eric Hamilton	Matt Knizner	82	1982	Pittsburgh
	Eric Hamilton	Matt Knizner	82	1986	Pittsburgh
	Freddie Scott	Kerry Collins	82	1994	Rutgers

- All-time career and single season records for Tight Ends

== Total offense ==
=== Total offense yards ===
Career
Rk	Player	Yards	Years
1	Sean Clifford	11,734	2018 2019 2020 2021 2022
2	Trace McSorley	11,596	2015 2016 2017 2018
3	Christian Hackenberg	8,215	2013 2014 2015
4	Drew Allar	8,153	2022 2023 2024 2025
5	Zack Mills	7,853	2001 2002 2003 2004
6	Daryll Clark	6,377	2006 2007 2008 2009
7	Matt McGloin	6,325	2009 2010 2011 2012
8	Tony Sacca	6,000	1988 1989 1990 1991
9	Saquon Barkley	5,574	2015 2016 2017
10	Kerry Collins	5,300	1991 1992 1993 1994

Single season
Rk	Player	Yards	Year
1	Trace McSorley	4,061	2017
2	Trace McSorley	3,979	2016
3	Drew Allar	3,629	2024
4	Trace McSorley	3,328	2018
5	Sean Clifford	3,270	2021
6	Matt McGloin	3,220	2012
7	Daryll Clark	3,214	2009
8	Michael Robinson	3,156	2005
9	Sean Clifford	3,056	2019
10	Sean Clifford	2,998	2022

Single game
Rk	Player	Yards	Year	Opponent
1	Trace McSorley	461	2018	Ohio State
2	Christian Hackenberg	456	2014	UCF (Croke Park Classic)
3	Sean Clifford	452	2019	Maryland
4	Drew Allar	423	2024	USC
5	Zack Mills	418	2001	Ohio State
6	Trace McSorley	408	2016	Minnesota
7	Trace McSorley	402	2017	Washington (Fiesta Bowl)
8	Michael Robinson	398	2003	Wisconsin
9	Sean Clifford	393	2021	Villanova
10	Zack Mills	389	2002	Iowa
	Trace McSorley	389	2016	Michigan State

=== Touchdowns responsible for ===
In official NCAA records, "touchdowns responsible for" includes rushing and passing touchdowns, but not receptions or returns—the same statistical categories used to measure total offense.

Career
Rk	Player	TDs	Years
1	Trace McSorley	107	2015 2016 2017 2018
2	Sean Clifford	101	2018 2019 2020 2021 2022
3	Drew Allar	73	2022 2023 2024 2025
4	Daryll Clark	65	2006 2007 2008 2009
5	Nicholas Singleton	55	2022 2023 2024 2025
	Christian Hackenberg	55	2013 2014 2015
6	Saquon Barkley	54	2015 2016 2017
7	Matt McGloin	53	2009 2010 2011 2012
	Zack Mills	53	2001 2002 2003 2004
10	Todd Blackledge	51	1980 1981 1982

Single season
Rk	Player	TDs	Year
1	Trace McSorley	39	2017
2	Trace McSorley	36	2016
3	Daryll Clark	31	2009
4	Trace McSorley	30	2018
	Drew Allar	30	2024
6	Daryll Clark	29	2008
	Matt McGloin	29	2012
	Sean Clifford	29	2022
	Drew Allar	29	2023
10	Michael Robinson	28	2005
	Sean Clifford	28	2019

== Defense ==
=== Interceptions ===
Career
Rank	Player	Ints	Years
1	Neal Smith	19	1967 1968 1969
2	Pete Harris	15	1977 1978 1979 1980
	Darren Perry	15	1988 1989 1990 1991
4	Kim Herring	13	1993 1994 1995 1996
5	Brian Miller	12	1994 1995 1996
	Anthony Scirrotto	12	2005 2006 2007 2008
	Alan Zemaitis	12	2003 2004 2005

Single season
Rank	Player	Ints	Year
1	Neal Smith	10	1969
	Pete Harris	10	1978
3	Darren Perry	7	1990
	Kim Herring	7	1996
5	Sherrod Rainge	6	1989
	Leonard Humphries	6	1990
	Darren Perry	6	1991
	David Macklin	6	1998
	Alan Zemaitis	6	2005
	Anthony Scirrotto	6	2006
	Ji'Ayir Brown	6	2021

=== Tackles ===
Career
Rank	Player	Tackles	Years
1	Dan Connor	419	2004 2005 2006 2007
2	Paul Posluszny	372	2003 2004 2005 2006
3	Dan Connor	334	2004 2005 2006 2007
4	Marcus Allen	320	2014 2015 2016 2017
5	Sean Lee	313	2006 2007 2008 2009
6	Marcus Allen	311	2014 2015 2016 2017
7	Mike Hull	294	2011 2012 2013 2014
8	Jason Cabinda	285	2014 2015 2016 2017

Single season
Rank	Player	Tackles	Year
1	Greg Buttle	165	1974
2	Dan Connor	145	2007
3	Sean Lee	138	2007
4	Mike Hull	138	2014
5	Paul Posluszny	116	2005
	Paul Posluszny	116	2006
	Josh Hull	116	2009
8	Dan Connor	113	2006
9	Chris Colasanti	112	2010
10	Marcus Allen	110	2016

=== Sacks ===
Career
Rank	Player	Sacks	Years
1	Courtney Brown	33.0	1996 1997 1998 1999
2	Larry Kubin	30.0	1977 1978 1979 1980
3	Michael Haynes	25.5	1999 2000 2001 2002
4	Dani Dennis-Sutton	23.5	2022 2023 2024 2025
5	Abdul Carter	23.0	2022 2023 2024
6	Shaka Toney	20.5	2017 2018 2019 2020
7	Anthony Zettel	20.0	2012 2013 2014 2015
8	Yetur Gross-Matos	18.5	2017 2018 2019
9	Carl Nassib	17.5	2013 2014 2015
10	Maurice Evans	17.0	2006 2007 2008

Single season
Rank	Player	Sacks	Year
1	Carl Nassib	15.5	2015
2	Larry Kubin	15.0	1979
	Michael Haynes	15.0	2002
4	Courtney Brown	13.5	1999
5	Maurice Evans	12.5	2007
6	Aaron Maybin	12.0	2008
	Abdul Carter	12.0	2024
8	Tamba Hali	11.0	2005
9	Arnold Ebiketie	9.5	2021
10	Yetur Gross-Matos	9	2019

== Kicking ==
=== Extra Point Attempts ===
Career
Rk	Player	XPA	Years
1	Jake Pinegar	202	2018 2019 2020 2021 2022
2	Kevin Kelly	185	2005 2006 2007 2008
3	Tyler Davis	144	2015 2016 2017
4	Brett Conway	142	1993 1994 1995 1996
5	Craig Fayak	139	1990 1991 1992 1993
6	Travis Forney	121	1996 1997 1998 1999
	Robbie Gould	121	2001 2002 2003 2004
8	Sam Ficken	112	2011 2012 2013 2014
9	Ryan Barker	94	2024 2025
10	Massimo Manca	87	1982 1984 1985 1986

=== Extra Points Made ===
Career
Rk	Player	XPM	Years
1	Jake Pinegar	195	2018 2019 2020 2021 2022
2	Kevin Kelly	183	2005 2006 2007 2008
3	Tyler Davis	144	2015 2016 2017
4	Brett Conway	141	1993 1994 1995 1996
5	Craig Fayak	132	1990 1991 1992 1993
6	Travis Forney	117	1996 1997 1998 1999
7	Robbie Gould	115	2001 2002 2003 2004
8	Sam Ficken	109	2011 2012 2013 2014
9	Ryan Barker	92	2024 2025
10	Massimo Manca	86	1982 1984 1985 1986

=== Extra Point Percentage ===
- Minimum of 40 Attempts

Career
Rk	Player	XP%	Years
1	Tyler Davis	100%	2015 2016 2017
	Collin Wagner	100%	2007 2008 2009 2010
	Herb Menhardt	100%	1976 1977 1978 1979 1980
	Alex Felkins	100%	2023
5	Brett Conway	99.3%	1993 1994 1995 1996
6	Kevin Kelly	98.9%	2005 2006 2007 2008
	Massimo Manca	98.9%	1982 1984 1985 1986
8	Ryan Barker	97.9%	2024 2025
9	Sam Ficken	97.3%	2011 2012 2013 2014
10	Travis Forney	96.7%	1996 1997 1998 1999

=== Field Goal Attempts ===
Career
Rk	Player	FGA	Years
1	Kevin Kelly	107	2005 2006 2007 2008
2	Craig Fayak	80	1990 1991 1992 1993
3	Sam Ficken	75	2011 2012 2013 2014
4	Jake Pinegar	67	2018 2019 2020 2021 2022
5	Travis Forney	63	1996 1997 1998 1999
6	Brett Conway	61	1993 1994 1995 1996
	Matt Bahr	61	1976 1977 1978
	Robbie Gould	61	2001 2002 2003 2004
9	Massimo Manca	59	1982 1984 1985 1986
10	Tyler Davis	49	2015 2016 2017
	Nick Gancitano	49	1982 1983 1984

=== Field Goals Made ===
Career
Rk	Player	FGs	Years
1	Kevin Kelly	78	2005 2006 2007 2008
2	Sam Ficken	54	2011 2012 2013 2014
3	Craig Fayak	50	1990 1991 1992 1993
4	Jake Pinegar	49	2018 2019 2020 2021 2022
5	Travis Forney	47	1996 1997 1998 1999
6	Brett Conway	45	1993 1994 1995 1996
7	Massimo Manca	40	1982 1984 1985 1986
8	Matt Bahr	39	1976 1977 1978
	Robbie Gould	39	2001 2002 2003 2004
	Tyler Davis	39	2015 2016 2017

Single season
Rk	Player	FGs	Year
1	Sam Ficken	24	2014
2	Matt Bahr	22	1977
	Kevin Kelly	22	2006
	Tyler Davis	22	2016
5	Massimo Manca	21	1985
	Travis Forney	21	1999
7	Travis Forney	20	1998
	Kevin Kelly	20	2007
	Kevin Kelly	20	2008
	Collin Wagner	20	2010

Single game
Rk	Player	FGs	Year	Opponent
1	Brian Franco	5	1981	Nebraska
	Massimo Manca	5	1985	Notre Dame
	Travis Forney	5	1998	Michigan State
	Collin Wagner	5	2010	Temple

=== Field Goal Percentage ===
*Minimum of 40 Attempts

Career
Rk	Player	FG%	Years
1	Nick Gancitano	77.6%	1982 1983 1984
2	Travis Forney	74.6%	1996 1997 1998 1999
3	Brett Conway	73.8%	1993 1994 1995 1996
4	Jake Pinegar	73.1%	2018 2019 2020 2021 2022
5	Kevin Kelly	72.9%	2005 2006 2007 2008
6	Sam Ficken	72.0%	2011 2012 2013 2014
7	Massimo Manca	67.8%	1982 1984 1985 1986
8	Matt Bahr	63.9%	1976 1977 1978
	Robbie Gould	63.9%	2001 2002 2003 2004

=== Points ===
Career
Rk	Player	XPM	FGM	Total PTS	Years
1	Kevin Kelly	183	78	417	2005 2006 2007 2008
2	Jake Pinegar	195	49	342	2018 2019 2020 2021
3	Craig Fayak	182	50	282	1990 1991 1992 1993
4	Brett Conway	141	45	276	1993 1994 1995 1996
5	Sam Ficken	109	54	271	2011 2012 2013 2014
6	Tyler Davis	144	39	261	2015 2016 2017
7	Travis Forney	117	47	255	1996 1997 1998 1999
8	Robbie Gould	115	39	232	2001 2002 2003 2004
9	Massimo Manca	86	40	206	1982 1984 1985 1986
10	Collin Wagner	85	36	193	2007 2008 2009 2010

=== Longest field goal made ===
All-Time
Rank	Player	Yards	Year	Opponent
1	Jordan Stout	57	2019	Pittsburgh
2	Chris Bahr	55	1975	Temple
3	Sam Ficken	54	2013	Kent State
4	Kevin Kelly	53	2007	Iowa
	Jordan Stout	53	2019	Idaho
6	Kevin Kelly	52	2008	Syracuse
	Jordan Stout	52	2021	Michigan
8	Jake Pinegar	50	2022	Indiana
	Jake Pinegar	50	2022	Maryland
	Alex Felkins	50	2023	Indiana

== Special teams ==
=== Longest kickoff return ===
All-Time
Rank	Player	Yards	Year	Opponent	Notes
1	Chaz Powell	100	2010	Youngstown State	Resulted in Touchdown
	Lamont Wade	100	2020	Illinois	Resulted in Touchdown
	Nicholas Singleton	100	2022	Rutgers	Resulted in Touchdown
4	Saquon Barkley	98	2017	Indiana	Resulted in Touchdown
5	Larry Johnson	97	2001	Illinois	
	A.J. Wallace	97	2007	Ohio State	Resulted in Touchdown
	Saquon Barkley	97	2017	Ohio State	Resulted in Touchdown
8	Chaz Powell	95	2011	Indiana State	Resulted in Touchdown
9	Derrick Williams	94	2008	Illinois	Resulted in Touchdown
	Johnathan Thomas	94	2018	Indiana	

=== Longest punt return ===
All-Time
Rank	Player	Yards	Year	Opponent	Notes
1	Jahan Dotson	81	2020	Michigan State	Resulted in Touchdown
2	Derrick Williams	78	2007	Notre Dame	Resulted in Touchdown
3	Derrick Williams	78	2006	Temple	Resulted in Touchdown
4	Daequan Hardy	68	2023	UMass	Resulted in Touchdown
5	Derrick Williams	63	2008	Wisconsin	Resulted in Touchdown
6	DeAndre Tompkins	61	2017	Akron	Resulted in Touchdown
7	Daequan Hardy	56	2023	UMass	Resulted in Touchdown
8	Jahan Dotson	50	2020	Illinois	Helped set up two play touchdown drive

== Overall team records ==
=== Longest win streaks ===
Home & Away
Rank	Games	First win	Last win	Days	Opponent to End Streak	Score
1	23	9/21/1968	9/19/1970	728	@ Colorado	41-13
2	20	11/6/1993	9/23/1995	686	Wisconsin	17-9
3	19	10/8/1977	11/24/1978	412	Alabama (Sugar Bowl)	17-7
4	15	10/24/1970	11/20/1971	392	@ Tennessee	31-11
5	13	9/15/1973	9/14/1974	364	Navy	7- 6
	13	9/6/1986	9/5/1987	364	Alabama	24-13
7	12	10/25/1919	11/6/1920	378	@Lehigh	7-7
	12	10/26/1996	11/1/1997	371	Michigan	34-8
9	11	11/30/1911	10/11/1913	681	@ Washington & Jefferson	17-0
	11	9/7/1985	11/23/1985	77	Oklahoma (Orange Bowl)	25-10
	11	10/19/1991	10/3/1992	350	Miami (FL)	17-14
	11	11/28/1998	10/30/1999	336	Minnesota	24 -23

Home
Rank	Games	First win	Last win	Days	Opponent to End Streak	Score
1	29	10/4/1919	10/11/1924	1834	Syracuse	10-6d
2	23	10/28/1899	9/29/1906		Gettysburg	0-0
3	21	10/31/1970	9/14/1974	1414	Navy	7-6
4	18	10/26/1889	09/30/1899		Washington & Jefferson	0-0
5	17	10/7/1939	9/25/1943	1449	Colgate	0-0
6	16	9/3/2016	9/15/2018	742	Ohio State	27-26
7	15	9/25/1915	10/27/1917	763	Lehigh	9-0
	15	10/21/1967	9/19/1970	1064	Syracuse	24-7
9	14	9/14/1985	9/5/1987	721	Alabama	24-13
	14	9/22/1990	9/26/1992	735	Miami (FL)	17-14

Away
Rank	Games	First win	Last win	Days	Opponent to End Streak	Score
1	14	9/29/1967	11/29/1969	792	@ Colorado	41-13
2	12	10/7/1972	10/26/1974	749	@ North Carolina State	12-7
3	10	9/7/1985	9/26/1987	749	@ Syracuse	48-21
	10	11/20/1993	10/21/1995	700	@ Northwestern	21-10
5	9	9/2/1977	10/28/1978	421	@ Nebraska	42-17
	9	10/6/1979	10/17/1981	742	@ Miami (FL)	17-14
7	8	10/10/1970	11/20/1971	406	@ Tennessee	31-11
8	7	10/11/1947	11/6/1948	392	@ Pittsburgh	7-0
9	6	10/23/1982	10/15/1983	357	@ Boston College	27-17
	6	10/26/1996	11/15/1997	385	@ Michigan State	49-14

=== Longest bowl streak ===
All-Time
Rank	Streak	Years	Record	Head Coach	Notes
1	13 Years	1971-1983	9-4	Joe Paterno	1982: Won 1st National Championship in Sugar Bowl vs Georgia 27-23
2	11 Years	1989-1999	8-3	Joe Paterno	1994: Won Big Ten Championship, Won Rose Bowl vs Oregon 38-20
3	7 Years	2005-2011	4-3	Joe Paterno/ Tom Bradley	2005: Won Big Ten Championship, Won Orange Bowl vs Florida State 26-23 2008: Won Big Ten Championship, Lost Rose Bowl vs USC 24-38 2011: Won Big Ten Leaders Division, Lost TicketCity Bowl vs Houston 14-30 Streak Ended with NCAA Sanctions
4	6 Years	2014-2019	3-3	James Franklin	2016 : Won Big Ten Championship, Lost Rose Bowl vs USC 49-52
5	5 Years	2021-2024	3-3	James Franklin	2021: Lost Outback Bowl vs. Arkansas 2022: Won Rose Bowl vs Utah 2023: Lost Peach Bowl vs Ole Miss 2024: Lost B1G Championship vs. Oregon, Won CFP 1st Round vs SMU, Won Fiesta Bowl vs. Boise St. (CFP QF), Lost Orange Bowl vs. Notre Dame (CFP SF) 2025: Won Pinstripe Bowl vs. Clemson
5	4 Years	1959-1962	3-1	Charles A. "Rip" Engle	
7	3 Years	1967-1969	2-0-1	Joe Paterno	
	3 Years	1985-1987	1-2	Joe Paterno	1986 : Won 2nd national Championship in Fiesta Bowl vs Miami (FL) 14-10

=== Longest bowl win streak ===
Rank	Streak	Years	Head Coach	Notes
1	5 Years	1979-1983	Joe Paterno	1982: Won 1st National Championship in Sugar Bowl vs Georgia 27-23
2	4 Years	1993-1996	Joe Paterno	1994: Won Big Ten Championship, Won Rose Bowl vs Oregon 38-20
3	3 Years	1959-1961	Charles A. "Rip" Engle	
	3 Years	2005-2007	Joe Paterno	2005: Won Big Ten Championship, Won Orange Bowl vs Florida State 26-23

=== Largest bowl win/ loss margin ===
==== Largest win margin ====
Rank	Score	Margin	Bowl Game	Opponent	Season Year	Coach
1	W 41–12	+29	Liberty Bowl	Oregon Ducks	1960	Rip Engle
	W 43–14	+29	Outback Bowl	Auburn Tigers	1995	Joe Paterno
3	W 42–17	+25	Fiesta Bowl	Tennessee Volunteers	1991	Joe Paterno
4	W 30–6	+24	Cotton Bowl Classic	Texas Longhorns	1971	Joe Paterno
	W 24–0	+24	Alamo Bowl	Texas A&M Aggies	1999	Joe Paterno
6	W 38–15	+23	Fiesta Bowl	Texas Longhorns	1996	Joe Paterno
7	W 41–20	+21	Cotton Bowl Classic	Baylor Bears	1974	Joe Paterno
8	W 31–13	+18	Florida Citrus Bowl	Tennessee Volunteers	1993	Joe Paterno
	W 38–20	+18	Rose Bowl	Oregon Ducks	1994	Joe Paterno
10	W 31-14	+17	Fiesta Bowl	Boise State Broncos	2024	James Franklin

==== Largest loss margin ====
Rank	Score	Margin	Bowl Game	Opponent	Season Year	Coach
1	L 35–10	-25	Florida Citrus Bowl	Clemson Tigers	1987	Joe Paterno
2	L 24–3	-21	Blockbuster Bowl	Stanford Cardinal	1992	Joe Paterno
3	L 30–14	-16	TicketCity Bowl	Houston Cougars	2011	Tom Bradley
4	L 25-10	-15	Orange Bowl	Oklahoma Sooners	1985	Joe Paterno
	L 21-6	-15	Florida Citrus Bowl	Florida Gators	1997	Joe Paterno
6	L14-0	-14	Sugar Bowl	Oklahoma Sooners	1972	Joe Paterno
	L 38-24	-14	Rose Bowl	USC Trojans	2008	Joe Paterno
8	L 37-24	-13	Outback Bowl	Florida Gators	2010	Joe Paterno
9	L 14-3	-11	Rose Bowl	USC Trojans	1922	Hugo Bezdek
	L 20-9	-11	Gator Bowl	Notre Dame Fighting Irish	1976	Joe Paterno
