= 2015 Penn State Nittany Lions football team =

American college football season

2015 Penn State Nittany Lions football

TaxSlayer Bowl, L 17–24 vs. Georgia
- Conference: Big Ten Conference
- East Division
- Record: 7–6 (4–4 Big Ten)
- Head coach: James Franklin (2nd season)
- Offensive coordinator: John Donovan (2nd season)
- Offensive scheme: Multiple
- Defensive coordinator: Bob Shoop (2nd season)
- Base defense: 4–3
- Captains: Christian Hackenberg; Jordan Lucas; Angelo Mangiro; Von Walker; Anthony Zettel
- Home stadium: Beaver Stadium

2015 Big Ten Conference football standings
	Conf.			Overall
Team	W		L	W		L
East Division
No. 6 Michigan State xy$^	7	–	1	12	–	2
No. 4 Ohio State x	7	–	1	12	–	1
No. 12 Michigan	6	–	2	10	–	3
Penn State	4	–	4	7	–	6
Indiana	2	–	6	6	–	7
Rutgers	1	–	7	4	–	8
Maryland	1	–	7	3	–	9
West Division
No. 9 Iowa xy	8	–	0	12	–	2
No. 23 Northwestern	6	–	2	10	–	3
No. 21 Wisconsin	6	–	2	10	–	3
Nebraska	3	–	5	6	–	7
Minnesota	2	–	6	6	–	7
Illinois	2	–	6	5	–	7
Purdue	1	–	7	2	–	10
Championship: Michigan State 16, Iowa 13
^ – College Football Playoff participant; $ – Conference champion; x – Division champion/co-champions; y – Championship game participant; Rankings from AP Poll

The 2015 Penn State Nittany Lions football team represented Pennsylvania State University in the 2015 NCAA Division I FBS football season. The team was led by second year head-coach James Franklin and played its home games at Beaver Stadium in University Park, Pennsylvania. They were a member of the East Division of the Big Ten Conference. They finished the season 7–6, 4–4 in Big Ten play to finish in fourth place in the East Division. They were invited to the TaxSlayer Bowl where they lost to Georgia.

== Schedule ==
Date	Time	Opponent	Site	TV	Result	Attendance
September 5	3:30 p.m.	at Temple*	Lincoln Financial Field; Philadelphia, PA	ESPN	L 10–27	69,176
September 12	12:00 p.m.	Buffalo*	Beaver Stadium; University Park, PA	ESPN2	W 27–14	93,065
September 19	8:00 p.m.	Rutgers	Beaver Stadium; University Park, PA	BTN	W 28–3	103,323
September 26	3:30 p.m.	San Diego State*	Beaver Stadium; University Park, PA	BTN	W 37–21	95,107
October 3	12:00 p.m.	Army*	Beaver Stadium; University Park, PA	ESPNU	W 20–14	107,387
October 10	12:00 p.m.	Indiana^{†}	Beaver Stadium; University Park, PA	ESPN	W 29–7	97,873
October 17	8:00 p.m.	at No. 1 Ohio State	Ohio Stadium; Columbus, OH (rivalry)	ABC	L 10–38	108,423
October 24	3:30 p.m.	vs. Maryland	M&T Bank Stadium; Baltimore, MD (rivalry)	ESPN	W 31–30	68,948
October 31	12:00 p.m.	Illinois	Beaver Stadium; University Park, PA	ESPN2	W 39–0	94,417
November 7	12:00 p.m.	at Northwestern	Ryan Field; Evanston, IL	ESPNU	L 21–23	34,116
November 21	12:00 p.m.	No. 14 Michigan	Beaver Stadium; University Park, PA (rivalry)	ABC	L 16–28	107,418
November 28	3:30 p.m.	at No. 6 Michigan State	Spartan Stadium; East Lansing, MI (rivalry)	ESPN	L 16–55	74,705
January 2, 2016	12:00 p.m.	vs. Georgia*	EverBank Field; Jacksonville, FL (TaxSlayer Bowl)	ESPN	L 17–24	58,212
*Non-conference game; ^{†}Homecoming; Rankings from AP Poll released prior to the game; All times are in Eastern time

== Roster ==
2015 Penn State Nittany Lions football team roster
Players
Coaches
Offense

Pos.	#	Name	Class
WR	2	Jake Kiley	Jr
WR	3	DeAndre Thompkins	Fr
QB	4	Tommy Stevens	Fr
WR	5	DaeSean Hamilton	So
RB	6	Andre Robinson	Fr
WR	7	Geno Lewis	Jr
RB	8	Mark Allen	Fr
QB	9	Trace McSorley	Fr
WR	10	Brandon Polk	Fr
TE	11	Brent Wilkerson	Jr
WR	12	Chris Godwin	So
WR	13	Saeed Blacknall	So
QB	14	Christian Hackenberg	Jr
QB	16	Billy Fessler	Fr
QB	17	Jackson Erdmann	Fr
TE	18	Jonathan Holland	Fr
WR	19	Gregg Garrity	Jr
RB	20	Johnathan Thomas	Fr
RB	22	Akeel Lynch	Jr
RB	24	Nick Scott	Fr
RB	26	Saquon Barkley	Fr
RB	27	Brandon Johnson	Sr
TE	30	Charles Idemudia	Jr
TE	34	Dominic Salomone	Jr
RB	36	Troy Shorts	Fr
WR	39	Josh McPhearson	So
G, C	52	Ryan Bates	Fr
G, C	53	Derek Dowrey	Jr
C, G	55	Wendy Laurent	Jr
G, C	57	Steven Gonzalez	Fr
OT	58	Chance Sorrell	Fr
OT	59	Andrew Nelson	So
OT	60	Noah Beh	Fr
G	61	Jack Lasher	Fr
G	62	Zach Simpson	Fr
OL	66	Angelo Mangiro	Sr
OL	68	Kevin Reihner	Sr
G, C	69	Adam De Boef	Fr
G, C	70	Brendan Mahon	So
OT	71	Albert Hall	Jr
G, C	72	Brian Gaia	Jr
OT	73	Paris Palmer	Jr
G, C	74	Evan Galimberti	So
OT	75	Brendan Brosnan	Fr
OT	76	Sterling Jenkins	Fr
G, C	77	Chasz Wright	Fr
C, G	78	Tom Devenney	So
OT	79	Charlie Shuman	Fr
WR	80	Matt Zanellato	Sr
TE	81	Adam Breneman	So
WR	82	Tyler Shoop	Fr
TE	83	Nick Bowers	Fr
WR	84	Juwan Johnson	Fr
WR	85	Irvin Charles	Fr
TE	87	Kyle Carter	Sr
WR	87	Dan Chisena	Fr
TE	88	Mike Gesicki	So
WR	89	Gordon Bentley	So
TE	89	Tom Pancoast	So

Defense

Pos.	#	Name	Class
CB	1	Christian Campbell	So
S	2	Marcus Allen	So
CB	4	Daquan Worley	Fr
LB	5	Nyeem Wartman-White	Jr
S	6	Malik Golden	Jr
LB	7	Koa Farmer	Fr
LB	8	Gary Wooten Jr.	Jr
S	9	Jordan Lucas	Sr
CB	10	Trevor Williams	Sr
LB	11	Brandon Bell	Jr
CB	12	Jordan Smith	Jr
S	14	Jarvis Miller	Fr
CB	15	Grant Haley	So
S	16	John Petrishen	Fr
CB	17	Garrett Taylor	Fr
DE	19	Torrence Brown	Fr
LB	20	Jordan Dudas	Sr
CB	21	Amani Oruwariye	Fr
S	23	Ayron Monroe	Fr
S	24	Anthony Smith	So
LB	25	Von Walker	Jr
S	27	Colin Harrop	Jr
S	28	Troy Apke	So
CB	29	John Reid	Fr
DE	30	Kevin Givens	Fr
CB	31	Desi Davis	So
S	32	Joe Berg	Fr
LB	32	Jack Haffner	Jr
LB	33	Jake Cooper	Fr
LB	34	Jan Johnson	Fr
LB	35	Matthew Baney	Sr
CB	37	Kyle Alston	So
CB	38	Desi Davis	So
LB	38	Ben Kline	Sr
LB	40	Jason Cabinda	So
DT	41	Parker Cothren	So
LB	42	Troy Reeder	Fr
LB	43	Manny Bowen	Fr
S	45	Bryant Harper	Jr
DE	46	Colin Castagna	Fr
LB	47	Brandon Smith	So
DE	48	Shareef Miller	Fr
DE	49	Will Eikenberry	Fr
S	49	Brian Tomasetti	So
DE	52	Curtis Cothran	So
DT	54	Robert Windsor	Fr
DE	55	Kam Carter	Fr
DT	63	Ryan Monk	Fr
DE	90	Garrett Sickels	So
DT	91	Tarow Barney	Sr
DT	92	Joe Holmes	Fr
DT	93	Antoine White	Fr
DE	94	Evan Schwan	Jr
DE	95	Carl Nassib	Sr
DT	96	Immanuel Iyke	Fr
DE	97	Ryan Buchholz	Fr
DT	98	Anthony Zettel	Sr
DT	99	Austin Johnson	Jr

Special teams

Pos.	#	Name	Class
K, P	37	Chris Gulla	So
SN	41	Zach Ladonis	So
SN	44	Tyler Yazujian	Jr
K, P	91	Nick Boumerhi	Fr
P	92	Daniel Pasquariello	So
P	93	Robby Liebel	Fr
K, P	95	Tyler Davis	So
SN	96	Kyle Vasey	Fr
SN	97	Nick Cox	Fr
K, P	98	Jordan Wombacker	Fr
K	99	Joey Julius	Fr

Head coach

- James Franklin

Coordinators/assistant coaches

- Bob Shoop (defensive coordinator/safeties)
- John Donovan (offensive coordinator/tight ends)
- Charles Huff (running backs/special teams coordinator)
- Brent Pry (assistant head coach/co-defensive coordinator/linebackers)
- Ricky Rahne (quarterbacks/passing game coordinator)
- Josh Gattis (wide receivers/offensive recruiting coordinator)
- Terry Smith (cornerbacks/defensive recruiting coordinator)
- Herb Hand (run game coordinator/offensive line)
- Sean Spencer (defensive line)
- Dwight Galt (strength and conditioning)
- Joe Brady IV (graduate assistant)
- Tommy Galt (graduate assistant)
- Andrew Jackson (graduate assistant)
- Ryan Smith (graduate assistant)

Legend

- (C) Team captain
- (S) Suspended
- (I) Ineligible
- Injured
- Redshirt

== Staff ==
Position	Name	Alma mater
Head coach	James Franklin	East Stroudsburg (1994)
Defensive coordinator/Safeties	Bob Shoop	Yale (1988)
Offensive coordinator/tight ends	John Donovan	Johns Hopkins (1997)
Linebackers/co-Defensive coordinator/assistant head coach	Brent Pry	Buffalo (1993)
Running backs/Special teams coordinator	Charles Huff	Hampton (2005)
Quarterbacks/Passing Game Coordinator	Ricky Rahne	Cornell (2002)
Wide receivers/offensive Recruiting coordinator	Josh Gattis	Wake Forest (2006)
Cornerbacks/defensive Recruiting coordinator	Terry Smith	Penn State (1991)
Offensive line/Run Game Coordinator	Herb Hand	Hamilton College (1990)
Defensive line	Sean Spencer	Clarion (1995)
Strength and Conditioning	Dwight Galt	Maryland (1981)
Graduate Assistant	Joe Brady IV	College of William & Mary (2013)
Graduate Assistant	Tommy Galt	Maryland (2009)
Graduate Assistant	Andrew Jackson	LIU Post (2011)
Graduate Assistant	Ryan Smith	College of William & Mary (2014)

== Game summaries ==
=== Temple ===
Penn State vs. Temple – Game summary

Quarter	1	2	3	4	Total
Penn State	10	0	0	0	10
Temple	0	7	10	10	27

at Lincoln Financial Field

- Date: September 5
- Game time: 3:30 p.m. EDT
- Game weather: 86 °F (30 °C); partly cloudy
- Game attendance: 69,176
- Referee: Daniel Capron
- TV announcers (ESPN): Bob Wischusen, Brock Huard, Shannon Spake
- ESPN Box Score

Game information

First quarter

- PSU – Joey Julius, 34 yard field goal, 10:47 (PSU 3–0)
- PSU – Akeel Lynch, 41 yard run, Julius XP good, 6:34 (PSU 10–0)

Second quarter

- TU – Jahad Thomas, 1 yd run, Austin Jones XP good, 2:25 (PSU 10–7)

Third quarter

- TU – Jones, 40 yard field goal, 6:23 (TIE 10–10)
- TU – P.J. Walker, 1 yd run, Austin Jones XP good, 1:00 (TU 17–10)

Fourth quarter

- TU – Thomas, 24 yd run, Austin Jones XP good, 11:14 (TU 24–10)
- TU – Jones, 30 yard field goal, 5:41 (TU 27–10)

Top passer

- Christian Hackenberg – 11/25, 103 yards, INT

Top rushers

- Akeel Lynch – 10 carries, 78 yards, TD

Top receiver

- Chris Godwin – 5 receptions, 81 yards

Top defender

- Carl Nassib – 10 tackles, 2.5 tackles-for-loss (TFL), sack

This was Penn State's first loss to Temple since 1941.

=== Buffalo ===
Buffalo vs. Penn State – Game summary

Quarter	1	2	3	4	Total
Buffalo	0	0	7	7	14
Penn State	0	10	3	14	27

at Beaver Stadium

- Date: September 12
- Game time: 12:00 noon EDT
- Game weather: 59 °F (15 °C); light rain
- Game attendance: 93,065
- Referee: Don Willard
- TV announcers (ESPN2): Beth Mowins, Anthony Becht, Paul Carcaterra
- ESPN Box Score

Game information

First quarter

No scoring

Second quarter

- PSU – Brandon Polk, 22 yard run, Joey Julius XP good, 6:57 (PSU 7–0)
- PSU – Julius, 22 yard field goal, 3:58 (PSU 10–0)

Third quarter

- UB – Ron Willoughby, 14 yard pass from Joe Licata, Adam Mitcheson XP good, 5:33 (PSU 10–7)
- PSU – Julius, 21 yard field goal, 0:20 (PSU 13–7)

Fourth quarter

- PSU – DaeSean Hamilton, 5 yard pass from Christian Hackenberg, Julius XP good, 12:04 (PSU 20–7)
- PSU – Saquon Barkley, 9 yard run, Julius XP good, 9:02 (PSU 27–7)
- UB – Marcus McGill, 10 yard pass from Licata, Mitcheson XP good, 4:38 (PSU 27–14)

Top passer

- Christian Hackenberg – 14/27, 128 yards, TD

Top rushers

- Saquon Barkley – 12 carries, 115 yards, TD

Top receiver

- Chris Godwin – 5 receptions, 75 yards

Top defender

- Austin Johnson – 9 tackles, 2.5 tackles for loss (TFL), 1.5 sacks

=== Rutgers ===
Rutgers vs. Penn State – Game summary

Quarter	1	2	3	4	Total
Rutgers	0	0	0	3	3
Penn State	0	21	0	7	28

at Beaver Stadium

- Date: September 19
- Game time: 8:00 p.m EDT
- Game weather: 75 °F (24 °C); rain
- Game attendance: 103,323
- Referee: Jerry McGinn
- TV announcers (BTN): Kevin Kugler, Matt Millen, Lisa Byington
- ESPN Box Score

Game information

First quarter

No scoring

Second quarter

- PSU – DeAndre Thompkins, 2 yard run, Joey Julius XP good, 12:10 (PSU 7–0)
- PSU – Saquon Barkley, 15 yard run, Julius XP good, 2:06 (PSU 14–0)
- PSU – Akeel Lynch, 75 yard run, Julius XP good, 1:04 (PSU 21–0)

Third quarter

No scoring

Fourth quarter

- RU – Kyle Federico, 34 yard field goal, 10:35 (PSU 21–3)
- PSU – Barkley, 16 yard run, Julius XP good, 4:21 (PSU 28–3)

Top passer

- Christian Hackenberg – 10/19, 141 yards, 1 INT

Top rushers

- Saquon Barkley – 21 carries, 195 yards, 2 TD

Top receiver

- DaeSean Hamilton – 5 receptions, 86 yards

Top defender

- Marcus Allen – 11 tackles

=== San Diego State ===
San Diego State vs. Penn State – Game summary

Quarter	1	2	3	4	Total
San Diego State	7	7	7	0	21
Penn State	10	17	0	10	37

at Beaver Stadium

- Date: September 26
- Game time: 3:30 p.m EDT
- Game weather: 71 °F (22 °C); mostly sunny
- Game attendance: 95,107
- Referee: Jeff Maconaghy
- TV announcers (BTN): Kevin Kugler, Matt Millen, Lisa Byington
- ESPN Box Score

Game information

First quarter

- PSU – Saquon Barkley, 22 yard pass from Christian Hackenberg, Joey Julius XP good, 4:20 (PSU 7–0)
- SDS – Rashaad Penny, 100 yard kickoff return, Donny Hageman XP good, 4:08 (TIE 7–7)
- PSU – Julius, 40 yard field goal, 0:43 (PSU 10–7)

Second quarter

- PSU – Julius, 24 yard field goal, 11:59 (PSU 13–7)
- SDS – Mikah Holder, 19 yard pass from Maxwell Smith, Hageman XP good, 10:23 (SDS 14–13)
- PSU – Mark Allen, 13 yard pass from Hackenberg, Julius XP good, 1:03 (PSU 20–14)
- PSU – Chris Godwin, 11 yard pass from Hackenberg, Julius XP good, 0:17 (PSU 27–14)

Third quarter

- SDS – Donnel Pumphrey, 1 yard run, Hageman XP good, 8:11 (PSU 27–21)

Fourth quarter

- PSU – Austin Johnson, 71 yard fumble recovery, Julius XP good, 13:44 (PSU 34–21)
- PSU – Julius, 26 yard field goal, 9:52 (PSU 37–21)

Top passer

- Christian Hackenberg – 21/35, 296 yards, 3 TD

Top rushers

- Saquon Barkley – 8 carries, 62 yards

Top receiver

- Chris Godwin – 5 receptions, 78 yards, TD

Top defender

- Anthony Zettel – 7 tackles, 2.5 tackles-for-loss (TFL), 0.5 sack

=== Army ===
Army vs. Penn State – Game summary

Quarter	1	2	3	4	Total
Army	0	0	7	7	14
Penn State	7	3	10	0	20

at Beaver Stadium

- Date: October 3
- Game time: 12:00 p.m EDT
- Game weather: 46 °F (8 °C); light drizzle
- Game attendance: 107,387
- Referee: Todd Geerlings
- TV announcers (ESPNU): Anish Shroff, Ahmad Brooks
- ESPN Box Score

Game information

First quarter

- PSU – Nick Scott, 11 yard run, Joey Julius XP good, 9:57 (PSU 7–0)

Second quarter

- PSU – Julius, 37 yard field goal, 0:25 (PSU 10–0)

Third quarter

- PSU – Julius, 27 yard field goal, 9:53 (PSU 13–0)
- USMA – A.J. Schurr 3 yard run, Daniel Grochowski XP good, 5:36 (PSU 13–7)
- PSU – Mike Gesicki, 33 yard pass from Christian Hackenberg, Julius XP good, 0:00 (PSU 20–7)

Fourth quarter

- USMA – Schurr, 56 yard run, Grochowski XP good, 11:04 (PSU 20–14)

Top passer

- Christian Hackenberg – 10/19, 156 yards, TD

Top rushers

- Nick Scott – 12 carries, 54 yards, TD

Top receiver

- Chris Godwin – 4 receptions, 66 yards

Top defender

- Jason Cabinda – 14 tackles, 2 tackles-for-loss (TFL), 2 sacks

=== Indiana ===
Indiana vs. Penn State – Game summary

Quarter	1	2	3	4	Total
Indiana	7	0	0	0	7
Penn State	7	12	0	10	29

at Beaver Stadium

- Date: October 10
- Game time: 12:00 p.m EDT
- Game weather: 55 °F (13 °C); sunny
- Game attendance: 97,873
- Referee: Jeffrey Servinski
- TV announcers (ESPN): Beth Mowins, Anthony Becht, Paul Carcaterra
- ESPN Box Score

Game information

First quarter

- PSU – Brandon Polk, 39 yard pass from Christian Hackenberg, Joey Julius XP good, 7:35 (PSU 7–0)
- IU – Zander Diamont, 12 yard run, Griffin Oakes XP good, 4:11 (TIE 7–7)

Second quarter

- PSU – DaeSean Hamilton, 39 yard pass from Hackenberg, Julius XP missed, 5:40 (PSU 13–7)
- PSU – Hackenberg, 1 yard run, Julius XP missed, 0:36 (PSU 19–7)

Third quarter

No scoring

Fourth quarter

- PSU – Hackenberg, 5 yard run, Tyler Davis XP good, 10:37 (PSU 26–7)
- PSU – Davis, 30 yard field goal, 5:33 (PSU 29–7)

Top passer

- Christian Hackenberg – 21/39, 262 yards, 2 TD

Top rushers

- Nick Scott – 8 carries, 57 yards

Top receiver

- Chris Godwin – 4 receptions, 41 yards

Top defender

- Austin Johnson – 9 tackles, 1.5 tackles-for-loss (TFL), 1 sack

=== Ohio State ===
Penn State vs. Ohio State – Game summary

Quarter	1	2	3	4	Total
Penn State	3	0	7	0	10
#1 Ohio State	0	21	0	17	38

at Ohio Stadium

- Date: October 17
- Game time: 8:00 p.m. EDT
- Game weather: 42 °F (6 °C); mostly cloudy
- Game attendance: 108,423
- Referee: Daniel Capron
- TV announcers (ABC): Chris Fowler, Kirk Herbstreit, Heather Cox
- ESPN Box Score

Game information

First quarter

- PSU – Joey Julius, 33 yard field goal, 11:32 (PSU 3–0)

Second quarter

- OSU – J. T. Barrett, 5 yard run, Jack Willoughby XP good, 13:43 (OSU 7–3)
- OSU – Ezekiel Elliott, 11 yard run, Willoughby XP good, 9:26 (OSU 14–3)
- OSU – Barrett, 13 yard run, Willoughby XP good, 3:17 (OSU 21–3)

Third quarter

- PSU – DaeSean Hamilton, 8 yard pass from Christian Hackenberg, Julius XP good, 13:59 (OSU 21–10)

Fourth quarter

- OSU – Willoughby, 39 yard field goal, 12:54 (OSU 24–10)
- OSU – Braxton Miller, 5 yard pass from Barrett, Willoughby XP good, 6:25 (OSU 31–10)
- OSU – Michael Thomas, 6 yard pass from Barrett, Willoughby XP good, 4:14 (OSU 38–10)

Top passer

- Christian Hackenberg – 7/13, 120 yards, TD

Top rushers

- Saquon Barkley – 26 carries, 194 yards

Top receiver

- Chris Godwin – 3 receptions, 103 yards

Top defender

- Jordan Lucas – 9 tackles

=== Maryland ===
Penn State vs. Maryland – Game summary

Quarter	1	2	3	4	Total
Penn State	7	10	7	7	31
Maryland	7	6	14	3	30

at M&T Bank Stadium

- Date: October 24
- Game time: 3:30 p.m. EDT
- Game weather: 61 °F (16 °C); cloudy
- Game attendance: 68,948
- Referee: Michael Cannon
- TV announcers (ESPN): Dave LaMont, Ray Bentley, Dawn Davenport
- ESPN Box Score

Game information

First quarter

- PSU – Saquon Barkley, 6 yard run, Joey Julius XP good, 2:49 (PSU 7–0)
- UM – Perry Hills, 12 yard run, Brad Craddock XP good, 1:36 (TIE 7–7)

Second quarter

- UM – Craddock, 44 yard field goal, 9:35 (UM 10–7)
- UM – Craddock, 27 yard field goal, 3:51(UM 13–7)
- PSU – Chris Godwin, 37 yard pass from Christian Hackenberg, Julius XP good, 3:09 (PSU 14–13)
- PSU – Julius, 40 yard field goal, 0:31 (PSU 17–13)

Third quarter

- UM – Brandon Ross, 10 yard run, Craddock XP good, 9:17 (UM 20–17)
- PSU – DaeSean Hamilton, 20 yard pass from Hackenberg, Julius XP good, 5:32 (PSU 24–20)
- UM – DeAndre Lane, 10 yard pass from Hills, Craddock XP good, 0:51 (UM 27–24)

Fourth quarter

- PSU – Geno Lewis, 27 yard pass from Hackenberg, Julius XP good, 13:39 (PSU 31–27)
- UM – Craddock, 29 yard field goal, 10:15 (PSU 31–30)

Top passer

- Christian Hackenberg – 13/29, 315 yards, 3 TD

Top rushers

- Saquon Barkley – 20 carries, 65 yards, TD

Top receiver

- DaeSean Hamilton – 5 receptions, 96 yards, TD

Top defender

- Troy Reeder – 10 tackles

=== Illinois ===
Illinois vs. Penn State – Game summary

Quarter	1	2	3	4	Total
Illinois	0	0	0	0	0
Penn State	12	3	10	14	39

at Beaver Stadium

- Date: October 31
- Game time: 12:00 p.m EDT
- Game weather: 45 °F (7 °C); partly sunny
- Game attendance: 94,417
- Referee: John O'Neill
- TV announcers (ESPN2): Beth Mowins, Anthony Becht, Paul Carcaterra
- ESPN Box Score

Game information

First quarter

- PSU – Chris Godwin, 5 yard pass from Christian Hackenberg, Joey Julius XP missed, 5:52 (PSU 6–0)
- PSU – Geno Lewis, 6 yard pass from Hackenberg, Julius XP missed, 4:16 (PSU 12–0)

Second quarter

- PSU – Tyler Davis, 42 yard field goal, 4:16 (PSU 15–0)

Third quarter

- PSU – Hackenberg, 14 yard pass from Nick Scott, Davis XP good, 11:18 (PSU 22–0)
- PSU – Davis, 28 yard field goal, 3:56 (PSU 25–0)

Fourth quarter

- PSU – Saquon Barkley, 7 yard run, Davis XP good, 13:07 (PSU 32–0)
- PSU – Mark Allen, 20 yard run, Davis XP good, 6:33 (PSU 39–0)

Top passer

- Christian Hackenberg – 21/29, 266 yards, 2 TD

Top rushers

- Saquon Barkley – 20 carries, 84 yards, TD

Top receiver

- Chris Godwin – 7 receptions, 76 yards, TD

Top defender

- Jason Cabinda – 7 tackles

=== Northwestern ===
Penn State vs. Northwestern – Game summary

Quarter	1	2	3	4	Total
Penn State	0	7	7	7	21
Northwestern	0	20	0	3	23

at Ryan Field

- Date: November 7
- Game time: 12:00 p.m. EST
- Game weather: 50 °F (10 °C); sunny
- Game attendance: 34,116
- Referee: Don Willard
- TV announcers (ESPNU): Clay Matvick, John Congemi
- ESPN Box Score

Game information

First quarter

No scoring

Second quarter

- NU – Christian Jones, 14 yard pass from Zack Oliver, Jack Mitchell XP good, 12:56 (NU 7–0)
- NU – Oliver, 1 yard run, Mitchell XP missed, 6:00 (NU 13–0)
- PSU – Saquon Barkley, 7 yard run, Tyler Davis XP good, 2:18 (NU 13–7)
- NU – Solomon Vault, 96 yard kickoff return, Mitchell XP good, 2:04 (NU 20–7)

Third quarter

- PSU – DaeSean Hamilton, 32 yard pass from Geno Lewis, Davis XP good, 5:04 (NU 20–14)

Fourth quarter

- PSU – Barkley, 13 yard run, Davis XP good, 12:22 (PSU 21–20)
- NU – Mitchell, 35 yard field goal, 0:09 (NU 23–21)

Top passer

- Christian Hackenberg – 21/40, 205 yards, INT

Top rushers

- Saquon Barkley – 25 carries, 120 yards, 2 TD

Top receiver

- Chris Godwin – 8 receptions, 104 yards

Top defender

- Austin Johnson – 10 tackles, 2 tackles-for-loss (TFL), sack

=== Michigan ===
Michigan vs. Penn State – Game summary

Quarter	1	2	3	4	Total
#14 Michigan	7	7	7	7	28
Penn State	3	7	0	6	16

at Beaver Stadium

- Date: November 21
- Game time: 12:00 p.m EST
- Game weather: 40 °F (4 °C); mix of clouds, sun
- Game attendance: 107,418
- Referee: Ron Snodgrass
- TV announcers (ABC): Bob Wischusen, Brock Huard, Shannon Spake
- ESPN Box Score

Game information

First quarter

- PSU – Tyler Davis, 23 yard field goal, 11:09 (PSU 3–0)
- UM – Jake Butt, 26 yard pass from Jake Rudock, Kenny Allen XP good, 7:43 (UM 7–3)

Second quarter

- PSU – Saeed Blacknall, 25 yard pass from Christian Hackenberg, Davis XP good 2:01 (PSU 10–7)
- UM – Amara Darboh, 11 yard pass from Rudock, Allen XP good, 0:51 (UM 14–10)

Third quarter

- UM – Sione Houma, 1 yard run, Allen XP good, 6:07 (UM 21–10)

Fourth quarter

- PSU – Davis, 24 yard field goal, 14:02 (UM 21–13)
- PSU – Davis, 18 yard field goal, 8:05 (UM 21–16)
- UM – De'Veon Smith, 1 yard run, Allen XP good, 5:12 (UM 28–16)

Top passer

- Christian Hackenberg – 13/31, 137 yards, TD

Top rushers

- Saquon Barkley – 15 carries, 68 yards

Top receiver

- Chris Godwin – 3 receptions, 51 yards

Top defender

- Marcus Allen – 12 tackles

=== Michigan State ===
Penn State vs. Michigan State – Game summary

Quarter	1	2	3	4	Total
Penn State	0	10	0	6	16
#6 Michigan State	6	14	14	21	55

at Spartan Stadium

- Date: November 28
- Game time: 3:30 p.m. EST
- Game weather: 34 °F (1 °C); partly cloudy
- Game attendance: 74,705
- Referee: Michael Cannon
- TV announcers (ESPN): Bob Wischusen (play-by-play), Brock Huard (analyst), Shannon Spake (sideline)
- ESPN Box Score

Game information

First quarter

- MSU – R.J. Shelton, 29 yard pass from Connor Cook, Michael Geiger XP no good, 9:35 (MSU 6–0)

Second quarter

- PSU – Tyler Davis, 19 yard field goal, 14:14 (MSU 6–3)
- MSU – Gerald Holmes, 6 yard run, Geiger XP good, 7:12 (MSU 13–3)
- MSU – Demetrious Cox, 77 yard return of Kyle Carter's fumble, Geiger XP good, 2:36 (MSU 20–3)
- PSU – Chris Godwin, 8 yard pass from Christian Hackenberg, Davis XP good, 0:35 (MSU 20–10)

Third quarter

- MSU – Aaron Burbridge, 29 yard pass from Cook, Geiger XP good, 11:40 (MSU 27–10)
- MSU – Josiah Price, 6 yard pass from Cook, Geiger XP good, 3:31 (MSU 34–10)

Fourth quarter

- PSU – Godwin, 5 yard pass from Hackenberg, Hackenberg 2-point conversion failed, 14:51 (MSU 34–16)
- MSU – LJ Scott, 6 yard run, Geiger XP good, 11:18 (MSU 41–16)
- MSU – Malik McDowell, 13 yard interception return, Geiger XP good, 9:56 (MSU 48–16)
- MSU – Jack Allen, 9 yard run, Geiger XP good, 9:48 (MSU 55–16)

Top passer

- Christian Hackenberg – 22/39, 257 yards, 2 TD

Top rushers

- Saquon Barkley – 17 carries, 103 yards

Top receiver

- Chris Godwin – 11 receptions, 109 yards, 2 TD

Top defender

- Jason Cabinda – 13 tackles

=== Georgia ===
Penn State vs. Georgia – Game summary

Quarter	1	2	3	4	Total
Penn State	0	3	0	14	17
Georgia	3	14	7	0	24

at EverBank Field

- Date: January 2
- Game time: 12:00 p.m. EST
- Game weather: 57 °F (14 °C); partly cloudy
- Game attendance: 58,212
- Referee: Mike Mothershed
- TV announcers (ESPN): Allen Bestwick, Dan Hawkins, Tiffany Greene
- ESPN Box Score

Game information

First quarter

- UG – Marshall Morgan, 44 yard field goal, 7:02 (UG 3–0)

Second quarter

- PSU – Tyler Davis, 34 yard field goal, 8:08 (TIE 3–3)
- UG – Malcolm Mitchell, 44 yard pass from Terry Godwin, Morgan XP good, 6:46 (UG 10–3)
- UG – Godwin, 17 yard pass from Greyson Lambert, Patrick Beless XP good, 0:24 (UG 17–3)

Third quarter

- UG – Sony Michel, 21 yard run, Beless XP good, 4:15 (UG 24–3)

Fourth quarter

- PSU – Geno Lewis, 17 yard pass from Trace McSorley, Davis XP good, 14:53 (UG 24–10)
- PSU – DaeSean Hamilton, 20 yard pass from McSorley, Davis XP good, 6:14 (UG 24–17)

Top passer

- Trace McSorley – 14/27, 142 yards, 2 TD

Top rushers

- Saquon Barkley – 17 carries, 69 yards

Top receiver

- Chris Godwin – 6 receptions, 133 yards

Top defender

- Brandon Bell – 11 tackles, 1 tackle-for-loss (TFL)
