= Christian Hackenberg =

American football player (born 1995)

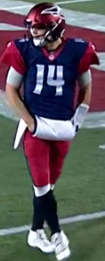
- Hackenberg with the Memphis Express in 2019

No. 14
- Position: Quarterback

Personal information
- Born: February 14, 1995 (age 31); Lehighton, Pennsylvania, U.S.
- Listed height: 6 ft 4 in (1.93 m)
- Listed weight: 228 lb (103 kg)

Career information
- High school: Fork Union Military Academy (Fork Union, Virginia)
- College: Penn State (2013–2015)
- NFL draft: 2016: 2nd round, 51st overall pick

Career history
- New York Jets (2016–2017); Oakland Raiders (2018)*; Philadelphia Eagles (2018)*; Cincinnati Bengals (2018)*; Memphis Express (2019)
- * Offseason or practice squad member only

Awards and highlights
- Big Ten Freshman of the Year (2013)
- Stats at Pro Football Reference

Christian Blaize Hackenberg (born February 14, 1995) is an American former professional football player who was a quarterback in the National Football League (NFL). He played college football for the Penn State Nittany Lions, and was selected by the New York Jets in the second round of the 2016 NFL draft. Hackenberg spent two seasons with the Jets, before being released, becoming only the third quarterback selected in the first or second round of the common-draft era (since 1967) not to play a game in his first two seasons. He was also a member of the Oakland Raiders, Philadelphia Eagles, and Cincinnati Bengals, although he never actually played in an NFL game. He was only activated for four games in his career, all with the Jets.

Following his stint in the NFL, Hackenberg was drafted by the Memphis Express in the second round of the 2019 AAF QB Draft. He saw his first meaningful action since leaving Penn State. However, he was benched after three games, and never returned before the league folded in midseason.

== Early life ==
Hackenberg is from Palmyra, Virginia, and attended Fluvanna County High School for his freshman year before transferring to Fork Union Military Academy in Fork Union, Virginia. He was ranked as the best pro-style quarterback recruit by ESPN, and the second best pro-style quarterback recruit by Rivals.com.

College recruiting
Name	Hometown	School	Height	Weight	40^{‡}	Commit date
Christian Hackenberg; QB	Fork Union, VA	Fork Union Military Academy	6 ft 4 in (1.93 m)	212 lb (96 kg)	4.84	Feb 29, 2012
Christian Hackenberg; QB	Recruit ratings: Scout: Rivals: 247Sports: (88)					
Overall recruit ranking:
‡ Refers to 40-yard dash; Note: In many cases, Scout, Rivals, 247Sports, On3, and ESPN may conflict in their listings of height, weight and 40 time.; In these cases, the average was taken. ESPN grades are on a 100-point scale.; Sources: "2013 Team Ranking". Rivals.com.

Hackenberg committed to Penn State after being recruited by a tandem of Penn State coaches – quarterbacks coach Charlie Fisher and running backs coach/recruiting coordinator Charles London, turning down offers from Alabama, UConn, Florida, Rutgers, South Carolina, Tennessee, and Virginia. Scouted as a five-star recruit by both Rivals.com and Scout.com, and the No. 2 pro-style quarterback in the nation, Hackenberg was described as an accurate, drop-back passer with ample athleticism who had a high ceiling.

== College career ==
As a true freshman in 2013, Hackenberg was named the team's starting quarterback. In the first three games of the season, he twice earned Big Ten Conference Freshman of the Week accolades, with a 72-percent completion percentage, 851 yards, 4 touchdowns and 4 interceptions. In a game against Eastern Michigan, he set the Penn State single-game record for passing yards by a freshman with 311 (previous record of 280 held by Zack Mills). Coach Bill O'Brien commended Hackenberg's leadership of the team, noting that the team fed off his calm demeanor, in contrast to O'Brien's fiery personality. He did note that Hackenberg made some mistakes typical of younger players, but he was on the fast track to grasping O'Brien's complex offensive schemes. Hackenberg was a five-time Big Ten Freshman of the Week and was named the 2013 Big Ten Football Freshman of the Year.

Hackenberg broke ten school freshman records, and one overall Penn State record in 2013.

Hackenberg finished his college career with totals of 8,318 passing yards, 48 passing touchdowns, 31 interceptions, and six rushing touchdowns. On January 2, 2016, he officially declared for the 2016 NFL draft.

== Professional career ==
=== Pre-draft ===
According to ESPN's Todd McShay, Hackenberg was the fifth-best quarterback among those eligible to enter the draft.

Pre-draft measurables
Height	Weight	Arm length	Hand span	Wingspan	40-yard dash	10-yard split	20-yard split	20-yard shuttle	Three-cone drill	Vertical jump	Broad jump	Wonderlic
6 ft 4 3/8 in (1.94 m)	223 lb (101 kg)	32 in (0.81 m)	9 in (0.23 m)	6 ft 5 3/4 in (1.97 m)	4.78 s	1.69 s	2.82 s	4.33 s	7.04 s	31 in (0.79 m)	9 ft 6 in (2.90 m)	24
All values from NFL Combine

=== New York Jets ===
==== 2016 season ====
The New York Jets selected Hackenberg in the second round (51st overall) of the 2016 NFL draft. On May 12, 2016, the New York Jets signed Hackenberg to a four-year, $4.66 million contract featuring a $1.6 million signing bonus.

Hackenberg made his preseason debut on August 27, 2016, during the third preseason game against the New York Giants, where he completed 6 out of 16 passes for 105 yards with a touchdown and an interception. He also played in the preseason finale against the Philadelphia Eagles on September 1, 2016, where he was 11 for 31 with 54 passing yards and an interception returned for a touchdown.

Hackenberg began the regular season as the Jets' fourth-string quarterback. However, he never played a down during the season. He was inactive for the first 15 regular season games, and was only active in the season finale due to a decimated depth chart. Throughout the season, he remained on the bench behind starting quarterback Ryan Fitzpatrick, who was benched for ineffective play; Geno Smith, who went on season-ending injured reserve list; and Bryce Petty, who also suffered a season-ending injury.

==== 2017 season ====
Hackenberg started the Jets' 2017 training camp competing with Josh McCown and Bryce Petty for the starting quarterback job.

Hackenberg started two preseason games and played in all four. In the first game against the Tennessee Titans, he was 18 of 25 for 127 yards and averaged 5.1 yards per attempt. Hackenberg got the start against the Detroit Lions in the second game and went 2 of 6 for 14 yards before being replaced by Petty in the first half. He also started in the Jets' third preseason game at the New York Giants, posting stats of 8/15 for 60 yards, and two pick sixes. He was replaced by Petty in the second half, but later returned after Petty was injured. In his second stint in the game, Hackenberg went 4 of 6 with a touchdown against the Giants' backups. Hackenberg came in for McCown in the final game against the Eagles. He finished 10 of 22 for 105 yards and a touchdown.

Hackenberg was beaten out by Petty for the backup spot behind McCown during the preseason. Hackenberg was active as McCown's backup for the first game of the season due to Petty being injured, but moved to third string when Petty returned the next week. Hackenberg was inactive the duration of the Jets' season until McCown broke his hand week 14 at the Denver Broncos and was placed on injured reserve. Hackenberg was active the final three games as Petty's backup. He did not play a down in the 2017 season.

=== Oakland Raiders ===
On May 22, 2018, the Jets traded Hackenberg to the Oakland Raiders for a conditional 2019 seventh-round pick. On June 12, 2018, Hackenberg was waived by the Raiders. The next day, Hackenberg cleared waivers and became a free agent.

=== Philadelphia Eagles ===
On August 12, 2018, Hackenberg signed with the Eagles. He sat out two games before making his preseason debut on August 30 against the Jets. He was waived on September 1, 2018.

=== Cincinnati Bengals ===
On September 3, 2018, Hackenberg was signed to the practice squad of the Cincinnati Bengals. On November 5, 2018, Hackenberg was released from the Bengals' practice squad.

=== Memphis Express ===
In November 2018, Hackenberg participated in the Alliance of American Football's quarterback camp. Later in the month, he was drafted by the Memphis Express in the second round of the 2019 AAF QB Draft.

Hackenberg struggled in his debut with the Express, his first meaningful game action since leaving Penn State. He completed just 10 of 23 passes for 87 yards and an interception before being pulled in the fourth quarter as the Express were shut out by the Birmingham Iron 26–0. His poor performances continued over the next two games as he combined for 32 of 62 completed passes with three interceptions and no touchdowns; he was replaced by Zach Mettenberger during the third game against the Orlando Apollos. On February 25, Express head coach Mike Singletary announced Mettenberger would become the starting quarterback. When Mettenberger was injured on March 16, Brandon Silvers, not Hackenberg, replaced him as the Express' quarterback. The same day, Memphis signed Johnny Manziel to serve as Silvers' backup. The league ceased operations in April 2019.

== Career statistics ==
=== Professional ===
Year	Team	League	Games		Passing								Rushing			
Year	Team	League	GP	GS	Cmp	Att	Pct	Yds	Y/A	TD	Int	Rtg	Att	Yds	Avg	TD
2016	NYJ	NFL	0	0	DNP											
2017	NYJ	NFL	0	0	DNP											
2019	MEM	AAF	3	3	32	62	51.6	277	4.5	0	3	43.6	9	47	5.2	1
Career			3	3	32	62	51.6	277	4.5	0	3	43.6	9	47	5.2	1

=== College ===
Year	Team	Games		Passing							Rushing			
Year	Team	GP	GS	Cmp	Att	Yds	Pct	TD	Int	Rtg	Att	Yds	Avg	TD
2013	Penn State	12	12	231	392	2,955	58.9	20	10	134.0	49	−68	−1.4	4
2014	Penn State	13	13	270	484	2,977	55.8	12	15	109.4	93	−94	−1.0	0
2015	Penn State	13	13	184	345	2,386	53.3	16	6	123.8	65	−84	−1.3	2
Totals		38	38	685	1,221	8,318	56.1	48	31	121.4	207	-246	-1.2	6

== Post-playing career ==
On June 14, 2020, Hackenberg announced that he would be transitioning to baseball and would attempt to sign with teams as a pitcher. Hackenberg left baseball to focus on completing his degree in communications and public relations and acquiring a real estate license. He worked remotely as an account executive for a cybersecurity services company, and was also a part-time realtor with Keller Williams.

On March 4, 2021, Hackenberg became the quarterback coach for the Winslow Township High School football team. On November 20, 2021, he and the Winslow Township Eagles won NJSIAA Group 4 Central Championship Game.

== Personal life ==
Hackenberg's father Erick was a backup quarterback for the Virginia Cavaliers football team, and his mother Nikki played volleyball for the Lehigh Mountain Hawks. His brothers include Brandon, a professional soccer player, as well as baseball players Adam and Drue Hackenberg. Christian Hackenberg and Tatum Coffey, a former PSU lacrosse player, announced their engagement in May 2018. The couple married on July 11, 2021.
