= Kaytron Allen =

American football player (born 2003)

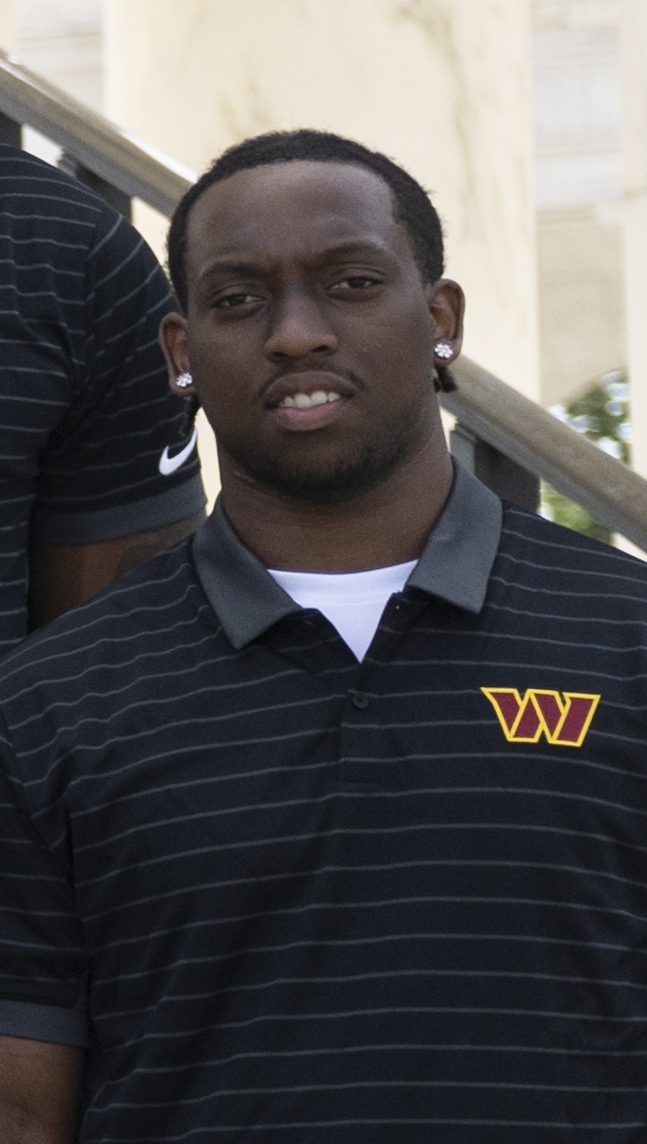
- Allen in 2026

No. 30 – Miami Dolphins
- Position: Running back
- Roster status: Active

Personal information
- Born: January 8, 2003 (age 23); Norfolk, Virginia, U.S.
- Listed height: 5 ft 11 in (1.80 m)
- Listed weight: 217 lb (98 kg)

Career information
- High school: IMG Academy (Bradenton, Florida)
- College: Penn State (2022–2025)
- NFL draft: 2026: 6th round, 187th overall pick

Career history
- Washington Commanders (2026); Miami Dolphins (2026–present)

Awards and highlights
- Second-team All-American (2025); Second-team All-Big Ten (2023)

Career NFL statistics
- Rushing yards: 41
- Rushing average: 3.4
- Rushing touchdowns: 0
- Stats at Pro Football Reference

Kaytron Lamont Allen (born January 8, 2003), nicknamed "Fatman", is an American professional football running back for the Miami Dolphins of the National Football League (NFL). He played college football for the Penn State Nittany Lions, finishing as their all-time leader in rushing yards, and was selected by the Washington Commanders in the sixth round of the 2026 NFL draft.

== Early life ==
Allen was born on January 8, 2003, in Norfolk, Virginia. He initially attended Norview High School and rushed for 1,465 yards and 16 touchdowns as a freshman before transferring to IMG Academy in Bradenton, Florida. Allen rushed for 1,097 yards and 16 touchdowns on 135 carries in his first season at IMG. He rushed for 515 yards and nine touchdowns in seven games during his junior season.

Allen rushed for over 1,400 yards and scored 27 touchdowns as a senior. Allen was rated a four-star recruit and committed to play college football at Penn State over offers from Alabama, Maryland, Tennessee, USC, Georgia, Ohio State, Florida, Texas, and Miami.

== College career ==
Allen joined the Penn State Nittany Lions as an early enrollee in January 2022. He entered his freshman season as the Nittany Lions' third running back. Allen was named the Big Ten Freshman of the Week after rushing for 111 yards and one touchdown on 13 carries in a 33–14 win over Central Michigan. Allen finished his Penn State career as their all-time leader in rushing yards with 4,180.

College statistics
Year	Team	Games		Rushing				Receiving			
Year	Team	GP	GS	Att	Yds	Avg	TD	Rec	Yds	Avg	TD
2022	Penn State	13	3	167	867	5.2	10	20	188	9.4	1
2023	Penn State	13	7	172	902	5.2	6	14	81	5.8	1
2024	Penn State	16	5	220	1,108	5.0	8	18	153	8.5	2
2025	Penn State	12	9	210	1,303	6.2	15	18	68	3.8	0
Career		54	24	769	4,180	5.4	39	70	490	7.0	4

== Professional career ==
Pre-draft measurables
Height	Weight	Arm length	Hand span	Wingspan
5 ft 11 3/8 in (1.81 m)	216 lb (98 kg)	29 1/2 in (0.75 m)	9 1/2 in (0.24 m)	6 ft 0 3/4 in (1.85 m)
All values from NFL Combine

=== Washington Commanders ===
Allen was selected by the Washington Commanders in the sixth round with the 187th overall pick of the 2026 NFL draft, signing his four-year rookie contract on May 8, 2026. In the fourth quarter of the Week 2 game against the Dallas Cowboys, he collided in a helmet-to-helmet hit into his own teammate, guard Sam Cosmi, which resulted in Cosmi leaving the game with a concussion. On October 8, Allen was waived.

=== Miami Dolphins ===
On October 9, 2026, the Miami Dolphins claimed Allen off waivers. Allen recorded his first career reception during a Week 9 matchup against the Detroit Lions on a successful fake punt attempt.

== Personal life ==
Allen prefers to be called by the nickname Fatman, which began in childhood.
