= DaeSean Hamilton =

American football player (born 1995)

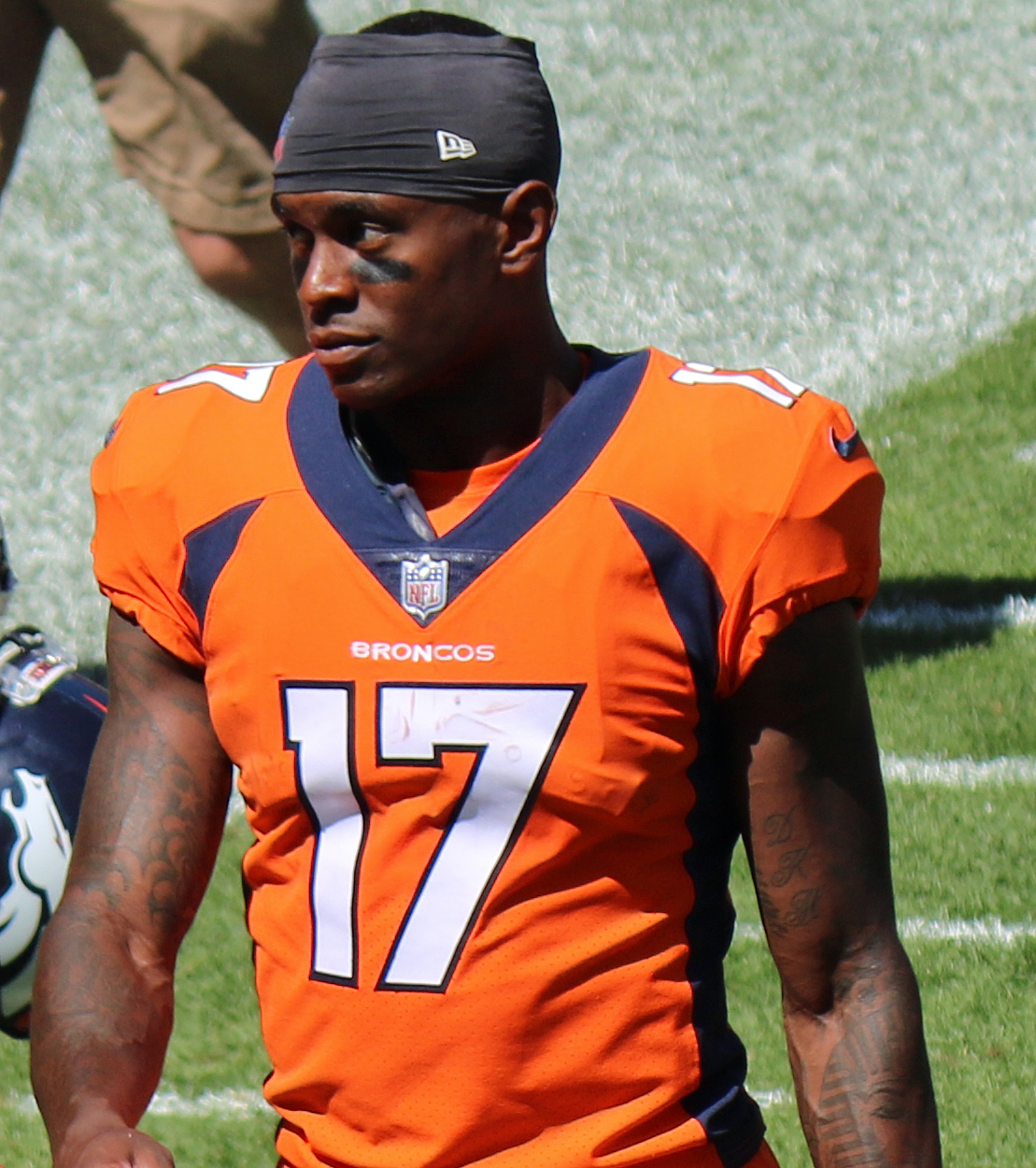
- Hamilton with the Denver Broncos in 2018

No. 17
- Position: Wide receiver

Personal information
- Born: March 10, 1995 (age 31); Okinawa Prefecture, Japan
- Listed height: 6 ft 1 in (1.85 m)
- Listed weight: 206 lb (93 kg)

Career information
- High school: Mountain View (Stafford, Virginia, U.S.)
- College: Penn State (2014–2017)
- NFL draft: 2018: 4th round, 113th overall pick

Career history
- Denver Broncos (2018–2021); Houston Texans (2022)*; Miami Dolphins (2022)*
- * Offseason or practice squad member only

Awards and highlights
- Second-team All-Big Ten (2014, 2017)

Career NFL statistics
- Receptions: 81
- Receiving yards: 833
- Receiving touchdowns: 5
- Stats at Pro Football Reference

DaeSean Kameron Hamilton (born March 10, 1995) is an American former professional football player who was a wide receiver in the National Football League (NFL). He played college football for the Penn State Nittany Lions. He was selected by the Denver Broncos in the fourth round of the 2018 NFL draft.

== Early life ==
Hamilton attended Mountain View High School in Stafford, Virginia, playing safety and wide receiver for coach Lou Sorrentino. He earned numerous awards between football, basketball and academics. He was a four-year letterman, two-time team captain, and one of the top playmakers in Virginia. As a senior, he was named honorable mention for all-state and earned first-team all-district, all-area and all-region honors. Hamilton earned the title of Commonwealth District Offensive Player-of-the-Year by making 64 catches for 1,073 yards and 10 touchdowns as a senior. Also, as a junior he gained titles of honorable-mention all-state, first-team all-district, all-area and all-region. Hamilton was invited to play in the Chesapeake Bowl and the U.S. Army All-American game. He was ranked a four-star recruit by ESPN.com and a three-star prospect by Rivals.com, Scout.com and 247Sports.com. He was ranked among the top 20 recruits in the state of Virginia and was a top 60 wide receiver, according to all four recruiting services. Hamilton graduated with honors and earned an advanced diploma from Mountain View, while attaining Academic All-Conference during his career, as well. He also lettered three times in basketball.

== College career ==
Hamilton finished his career as Penn State's all-time receptions leader with 214, making him the only player in school history with 200+ catches. His 2,842 career receiving yards puts him third all-time for the Nittany Lions.

Hamilton was a four-time academic All-Big Ten Conference honoree (2014–2017).

As a freshman (2014), Hamilton was selected to Big Ten All-Freshman Team by BTN.com, ESPN.com and 247Sports, Freshman All-American by College Football News (second-team) and Athlon Sports (third-team); second-team All-Big Ten by the media and Phil Steele's College Football, and honorable-mention All-Big Ten by coaches.

Hamilton was named honorable-mention All-Big Ten from the media following his sophomore year (2015).

Following his senior season (2017), Hamilton received All-Bowl Team honors from the Associated Press; and second-team All-Big Ten honors from the coaches, AP, Phil Steele and Pro Football Focus. He was selected for the 2018 East-West Shrine Game, Reese's Senior Bowl and the NFL Scouting Combine.

Penn State records

- 183 career receptions
- 14 receptions in a single game

== Professional career ==
=== Pre-draft ===
Hamilton participated in the 2018 NFL Scouting Combine.

Pre-draft measurables
Height	Weight	Arm length	Hand span	Wingspan	40-yard dash	10-yard split	20-yard split	20-yard shuttle	Three-cone drill	Vertical jump	Broad jump	Bench press
6 ft 0 5/8 in (1.84 m)	203 lb (92 kg)	31 in (0.79 m)	9 3/8 in (0.24 m)	6 ft 3 1/8 in (1.91 m)	4.52 s	1.57 s	2.61 s	4.15 s	6.84 s	34.5 in (0.88 m)	10 ft 3 in (3.12 m)	16 reps
All values from NFL Combine/Pro Day

=== Denver Broncos ===
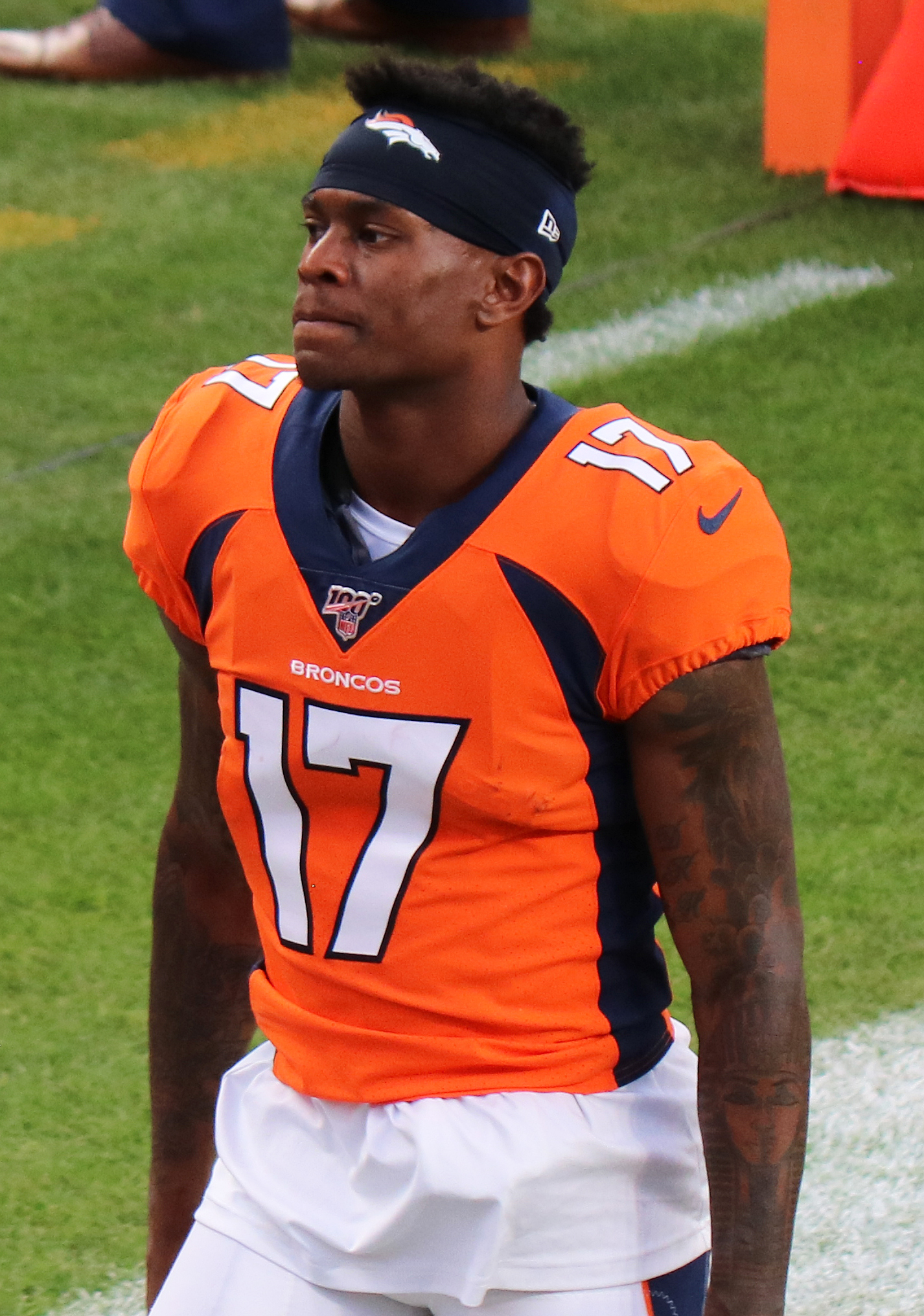
Hamilton with the Broncos in 2019

Hamilton was selected by the Denver Broncos in the fourth round, 113th overall, of the 2018 NFL draft. He made his NFL debut in Week 1 of the 2018 season against the Seattle Seahawks. In Week 3, he had three punt returns for 31 net yards in the 27–14 loss to the Baltimore Ravens. In Week 5, he recorded his first three professional receptions, which went for 31 total yards, in the 34–16 loss to the New York Jets. Overall, Hamilton finished the 2018 season with 30 receptions for 243 receiving yards and two receiving touchdowns.

Hamilton appeared in all 16 games, of which he started two, in the 2019 season. He recorded 28 receptions for 297 receiving yards and one receiving touchdown.

Hamilton had 23 catches for 293 yards and two touchdowns in 2020.

In the 2021 offseason, it was reported that Hamilton would be traded or released; however, on May 14, 2021, he suffered a torn ACL, and was waived with a non-football injury designation on May 18. He reverted to the reserve/non-football injury list the next day after clearing waivers. He was released on March 8, 2022.

=== Houston Texans ===
On March 28, 2022, Hamilton signed with the Houston Texans. On June 10, he was waived by the Texans.

=== Miami Dolphins ===
On December 14, 2022, Hamilton signed with the practice squad of the Miami Dolphins. He was released on December 30.

== Career statistics ==
Legend
**Bold**	Career high

=== NFL ===
Year	Team	Games		Receiving				
Year	Team	GP	GS	Rec	Yds	Avg	Lng	TD
2018	DEN	14	5	**30**	243	8.1	24	**2**
2019	DEN	16	2	28	**297**	10.6	28	1
2020	DEN	16	2	23	293	**12.7**	**40**	**2**
Total		46	9	81	833	10.3	40	5

=== College ===
Year	Team	GP	Receiving					Rushing				
Year	Team	GP	Rec	Yds	Avg	Lng	TD	Att	Yds	Avg	Lng	TD
2014	Penn State	13	**82**	**899**	11.0	51	2	**8**	**32**	**4.0**	**11**	0
2015	Penn State	13	45	580	12.9	48T	6	0	0	0.0	0	0
2016	Penn State	14	34	506	14.9	**54**	1	1	-12	-12.0	0	0
2017	Penn State	13	53	857	**16.2**	48	**9**	1	2	2.0	2	0
Career		53	214	2,842	13.3	54	18	10	22	2.2	11	0

== Personal life ==
Hamilton was born in Okinawa, Japan to his parents Johnie and Madgeline Hamilton, both U.S. Marines. The family eventually moved back to the United States and settled in Quantico, Virginia, when Hamilton was in fourth grade. Growing up, Hamilton took a role in raising his brother, Darius, who has nonverbal autism as his mother had breast cancer and his father was serving in the Marine Corps. Hamilton taught Darius many important tasks like how to tie his shoes and brush his teeth. During eighth-grade, Hamilton used his elective period to help Darius in his special-needs class. Hamilton has a "DKH" tattoo on his arm, which are his brother's initials. He started playing football in recreational leagues including Pop Warner.
