= Drue Hackenberg =

American baseball player (born 2002)

Atlanta Braves
- Pitcher
- Born: April 1, 2002 (age 24); Lehighton, Pennsylvania, U.S.
- Bats: Right Throws: Right
- Stats at Baseball Reference

Drue David Hackenberg (born April 1, 2002) is an American professional baseball pitcher in the Atlanta Braves organization.

== Amateur career ==
Hackenberg played baseball and football at Fork Union Military Academy, then transferred to the Miller School of Albemarle, where he was coached by Billy Wagner. In Hackenberg's first season at Virginia Tech, he pitched 92 2/3 innings and recorded a 3.30 ERA that led him to earn All-ACC First Team and Freshman All-American honors. In 2023, Hackenberg pitched 85 1/3 innings and produced a 5.70 ERA. In Hackenberg's college career, he pitched 178 innings, with a win–loss record of 15–10 in 31 appearances, and struck out 186 batters.

== Professional career ==
Hackenberg was drafted by the Atlanta Braves in the 2023 Major League Baseball draft. On July 13, he signed with the Braves for an over slot deal worth $2 million. Hackenberg made his first professional appearance for the Augusta GreenJackets on August 29, 2023. He faced the Salem Red Sox and threw 2 2/3 innings with five strikeouts and one walk. The following month, Hackenberg was promoted to the Mississippi Braves. Hackenberg started the 2024 season with the Rome Emperors, and returned to Mississippi in June. While facing the Pensacola Blue Wahoos on July 21, Hackenberg set a personal and Mississippi Braves franchise record for strikeouts, with sixteen. He ended the 2024 season by making four starts with the Gwinnett Stripers. Hackenberg was assigned to the Double–A Columbus Clingstones to start the 2025 season. He returned to Columbus in 2026.

== Personal life ==
Hackenberg's parents married in June 1994, and he is the youngest of four children. His father Erick was a third-string quarterback for the Virginia Cavaliers football team, and left the University of Virginia entirely to sell cars before enrolling at Susquehanna University, where his own father had graduated, to join the River Hawks football team as a starter. Drue Hackenberg's mother Nicole (née Miller) played volleyball for the Lehigh Mountain Hawks, and later became a volleyball coach. His older brothers are Christian, who was selected in the second round of the 2016 National Football League draft by the New York Jets, Brandon, who was a first round pick in the 2021 Major League Soccer draft, and Adam, who was selected by MLB's Chicago White Sox in the eighteenth round of the 2021 draft.
