= John Donovan (American football) =

American football player and coach (born 1974)

Personal information
- Born: September 11, 1974 (age 52); River Edge, New Jersey

Career information
- College: Johns Hopkins (1993–1996)

Career history
- Villanova (1997) Assistant defensive backs coach; Georgia Tech (1998–2000) Graduate assistant; Maryland (2001–2004) Recruiting coordinator; Maryland (2005) Running backs coach; Maryland (2006–2007) Quarterbacks coach; Maryland (2008–2010) Running backs coach; Vanderbilt (2011–2013) Offensive coordinator/running backs coach; Penn State (2014–2015) Offensive coordinator/tight ends coach; Jacksonville Jaguars (2016) Offensive quality control coach; Jacksonville Jaguars (2017–2018) Offensive assistant; Jacksonville Jaguars (2019) Assistant running backs coach; Washington (2020–2021) Offensive coordinator/quarterbacks coach; Green Bay Packers (2022) Senior analyst; Florida (2023-2025) Senior offensive analyst

John Donovan (born September 11, 1974) is an American football coach who is currently the senior offensive analyst for the Florida Gators. Previously, he was the senior analyst for the Green Bay Packers of the National Football League (NFL). He has been an assistant in the NFL and in four of the Power Five college football conferences (ACC, SEC, Big-10 and PAC-12). He was a defensive back at Johns Hopkins from 1993 to 1996.

== Coaching career ==
=== Early life ===
Originally a stand-out basketball player at River Dell High School, Donovan was encouraged to try football by legendary North Jersey football coach Greg Toal, who was then at River Dell. Donovan played three years for the Johns Hopkins Blue Jays football team. During his freshmen year, the defensive coordinator was Chip Kelly, and Donovan often served as the scout team quarterback. He later started as a defensive back. While at Johns Hopkins, Donovan worked as a summer intern for the Carolina Panthers. Shortly after, he moved on to take an assistant secondary coaching spot for the Villanova Wildcats football team in 1997. That season, the Wildcats posted a 12–1 record and were ranked number one in Division I-AA. He later moved on to finish earn his master's degree from Georgia Tech, while simultaneously serving as an assistant coach under head coach George O'Leary. He was temporarily promoted to coach the running backs in the 2000 Peach Bowl after Ralph Friedgen's departure to Maryland.

=== Maryland ===
Between 2001 and 2004, after following Friedgen to Maryland, he primarily served as a recruiting coordinator for the Terrapins. In 2005, Donovan was promoted to the running backs coach. He moved to the quarterback coach for the next two seasons, before being reassigned back to the running backs in 2008 amidst multiple coaching changes in the coaching staff. Friedgen himself was later removed as head coach of the Terrapins in December 2010, leaving many Maryland assistants to look for jobs elsewhere. With offensive coordinator James Franklin moving to take the head coaching position at Vanderbilt, Donovan was assigned with the play calling duties for the Military Bowl, Friedgen's final game as coach. The Terrapins won the game 51–20, at that time the most points ever scored by Maryland in a bowl game.

=== Vanderbilt ===
On January 13, 2011, Donovan was named as offensive coordinator and running backs coach for the Vanderbilt Commodores football team, rejoining former Maryland offensive coordinator James Franklin. These were "three of the most productive offensive seasons in the program's modern-era history". Under Donovan's direction, RB Zac Stacy ran for 1,193 yards in 2011 and 1,141 yards in 2012 to become the first Vanderbilt player with consecutive 1,000-yard seasons in program history. Stacy earned second team All-SEC honors and was drafted by the St. Louis Rams in 2013. Donovan's offensive units earned three of the top four total yardage marks in school history dating back to 1945, gaining at least 4,400 yards each season, including a school record 4,936 yards in 2012. The Commodores averaged 30.0 points per game in 2012, marking the first time in school history they averaged 30 or more points per game, and followed with another program record of 30.1 points per game in 2013."

=== Penn State ===
In January 2014, Donovan followed Franklin to Penn State as the offensive coordinator and tight ends coach. During his time at Penn State, Donovan coached TEs Jesse James and Mike Gesicki, both of whom were drafted into the NFL. While Donovan was the OC, Saquon Barkley won the BTN.com Freshman of the Year. Nevertheless, Donovan came under heavy criticism from the Nittany Lion fan base for questionable play calling. In November 2015, he was fired by Penn State. Following the firing, a former graduate assistant who worked on the staff during the 2014 season claimed on Twitter that the offense was largely designed by the "HFC" and PennLive.com's David Jones wrote an article headlined "John Donovan was scapegoat for rebuild that will take longer than fans can accept." However, Penn State won the Big Ten Championship the year after Donovan was fired, as new OC hire Joe Moorhead implemented his own system and employed a more accurate, more mobile quarterback, Trace McSorley.

=== Jacksonville Jaguars ===
On March 21, 2016, Donovan was hired by the Jacksonville Jaguars to be offensive quality control coach. After the 2016 season, he was named offensive assistant. Former Jaguars' offensive coordinator Nathaniel Hackett credited Donovan as "instrumental to the Jaguars' red zone plan" in their 2017 AFC Championship appearance season, which included a game that they went a perfect 6-for-6 in the red zone. Following the 2018 season, Donovan was named the assistant running backs coach. In 2019, while being coached by Donovan and Terry Robiskie, RB Leonard Fournette had his most productive season as a professional.

=== Washington ===
On January 10, 2020, the Washington Huskies' new head coach, Jimmy Lake, added Donovan to his coaching staff as the offensive coordinator and quarterbacks coach.

In his first season, the COVID-shortened 2020 campaign, Donovan took over an offense that returned just four starters and, with a new redshirt freshman quarterback, helped lead the Huskies to a successful season, marked by efficiency, balance and precision. Washington was third in the nation in turnover margin (with just three turnovers) and were second in the Pac-12 in third-down conversions. QB Dylan Morris won Pac-12 Freshman of the Week after two of the Huskies' four games and the team finished first in the Pac-12 North. On November 7, 2021, Donovan was fired by the Washington Huskies; Lake was suspended, then fired shortly thereafter. Overall, Lake's hiring of Donovan was met with substantial criticism, and Lake and Donovan's tenure together at Washington was short and judged by most fans to be unsuccessful. All told, together, Lake, Donovan and Dylan Morris went 7-6. After the dismissal of Lake and Donovan, Morris went 0-2, and the Huskies went 0-3.

=== Green Bay Packers ===
On April 18, 2022, Donovan was hired by the Green Bay Packers as their senior analyst.

== Personal life ==
Donovan married his wife Stacey (née Spicer) in May 2005. The couple has three children named John Patrick, Cate, and Shea. All four of Donovan's grandparents were born in Ireland. Donovan is a supporter of the New York Mets.
