= Chris Godwin =

American football player (born 1996)

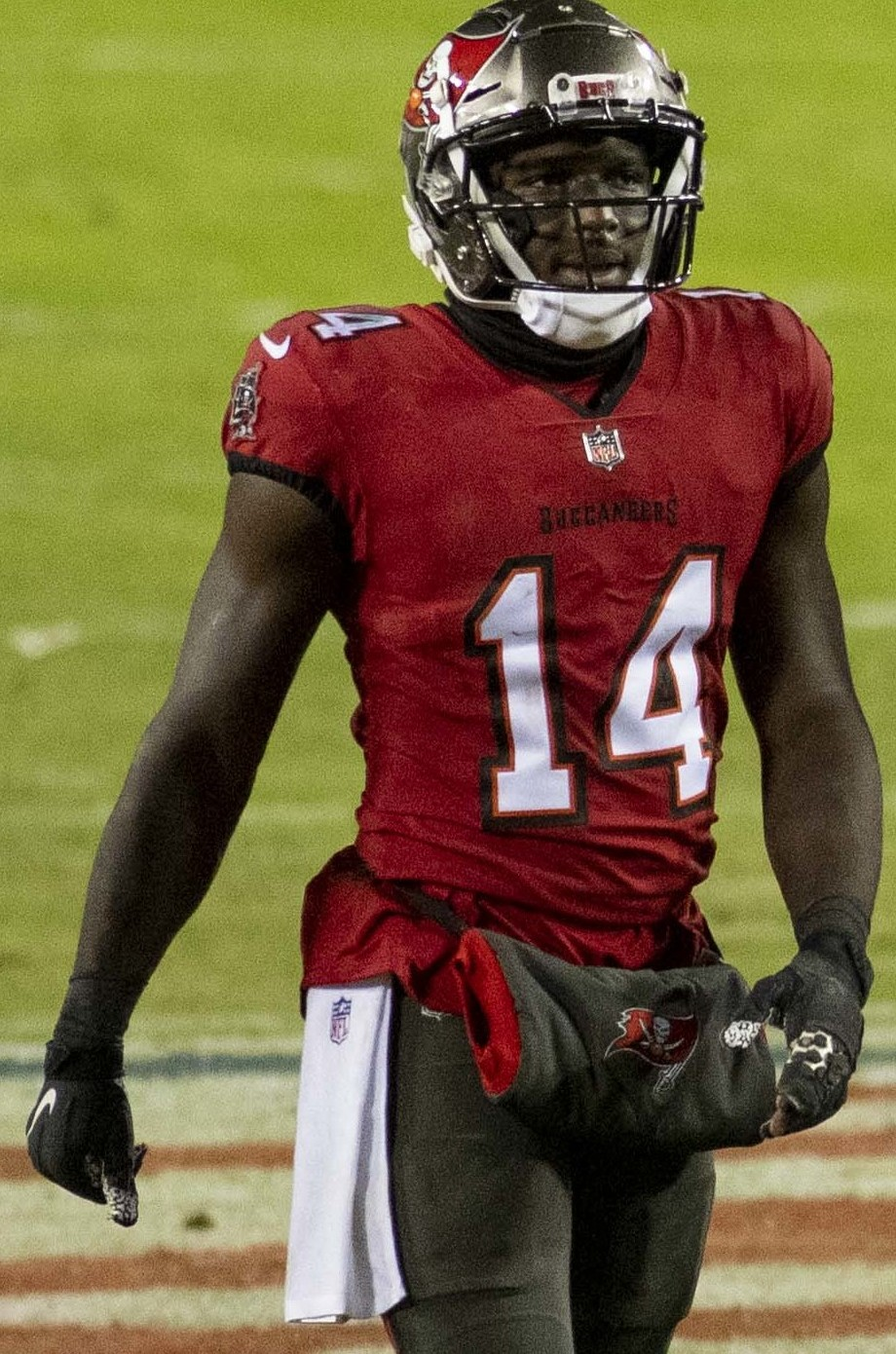
- Godwin with the Tampa Bay Buccaneers in 2021

No. 14 – Tampa Bay Buccaneers
- Position: Wide receiver
- Roster status: Active

Personal information
- Born: February 27, 1996 (age 30); Middletown, Delaware, U.S.
- Listed height: 6 ft 1 in (1.85 m)
- Listed weight: 209 lb (95 kg)

Career information
- High school: Middletown
- College: Penn State (2014–2016)
- NFL draft: 2017: 3rd round, 84th overall pick

Career history
- Tampa Bay Buccaneers (2017–present)

Awards and highlights
- Super Bowl champion (LV); Second-team All-Pro (2019); Pro Bowl (2019); Big Ten All-Freshman Team (2014); Third-team All-Big Ten (2016)

Career NFL statistics as of Week 6, 2026
- Receptions: 635
- Receiving yards: 7,842
- Receiving touchdowns: 41
- Stats at Pro Football Reference

Rod Christopher Godwin Jr. (born February 27, 1996) is an American professional football wide receiver for the Tampa Bay Buccaneers of the National Football League (NFL). He played college football for the Penn State Nittany Lions and was selected by the Buccaneers in the third round of the 2017 NFL draft. He won a Super Bowl championship with the Tampa Bay Buccaneers in their victory over the Kansas City Chiefs in Super Bowl LV.

== Early life ==
Godwin attended Middletown High School in Middletown, Delaware. He played high school football for the Cavaliers and was a key member responsible for a 41–7 record over his four years and two State Championships. He had more than 700 yards every year of his high school career and as a senior had 1,150 yards and 16 receiving touchdowns. Some of Godwin's honors in high school were the following, Delaware Gatorade Player of the Year as a senior, was selected to play in the 2013 Under Armour All-American Game, named All-state as a sophomore, junior and senior and four time All-conference wide receiver and kick returner. Academic All-State selection and a member of the Honor Roll. Rated a four-star prospect by all four major recruiting services and was named the top player in Delaware by ESPN, Rivals.com and 247Sports.com and was among the top 30 players nationally at wide receiver, receiving the distinction from ESPN, Rivals.com and 247Sports.com. Despite growing up in Delaware, Godwin grew up a fan of the Tampa Bay Buccaneers.

College recruiting
Name	Hometown	School	Height	Weight	40^{‡}	Commit date
Chris Godwin; WR	Middletown, Delaware	Middletown HS	6 ft 2 in (1.88 m)	203 lb (92 kg)	4.48	Apr 23, 2013
Chris Godwin; WR	Recruit ratings: Scout: Rivals: 247Sports: (83)					
Overall recruit ranking:
‡ Refers to 40-yard dash; Note: In many cases, Scout, Rivals, 247Sports, On3, and ESPN may conflict in their listings of height, weight and 40 time.; In these cases, the average was taken. ESPN grades are on a 100-point scale.; Sources: "2013 Team Ranking". Rivals.com.

== College career ==
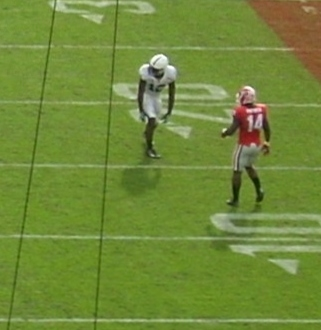
Godwin in 2016

In Godwin's freshman year, he appeared in all thirteen games for the Nittany Lions, recording 338 yards on 26 receptions. However, Godwin emerged as a leading wide receiver during his sophomore campaign, racking up 1,101 yards and five touchdowns. Over the course of his sophomore season, Godwin had at least 100 yards receiving in five games, culminating in a 133-yard effort during the TaxSlayer Bowl against Georgia.

Following his breakout sophomore season, Godwin began receiving double coverage from opposing defenses. After struggling to find his stride at the start of his junior season, Godwin finished with 117 yards receiving and a touchdown against the Temple Owls. In what proved to be his final game as a Nittany Lion, Godwin recorded a career-high 187 yards on nine catches and scored two touchdowns in a Rose Bowl loss to USC. Later that month Godwin announced he was going to declare for the 2017 NFL draft.

== Professional career ==
=== Pre-draft ===
Pre-draft measurables
Height	Weight	Arm length	Hand span	Wingspan	40-yard dash	10-yard split	20-yard split	20-yard shuttle	Three-cone drill	Vertical jump	Broad jump	Bench press
6 ft 1 in (1.85 m)	209 lb (95 kg)	31 5/8 in (0.80 m)	9 1/8 in (0.23 m)	6 ft 4 1/2 in (1.94 m)	4.42 s	1.49 s	2.58 s	4.00 s	7.01 s	36.0 in (0.91 m)	10 ft 6 in (3.20 m)	19 reps
All values from NFL Combine

On January 5, 2017, Godwin announced via his Twitter that he decided to enter the 2017 NFL draft, forgoing his final year of eligibility at Penn State.

In March 2017, Godwin performed well at the 2017 NFL Combine, having one of the top vertical jumps and 40-yard dash time among wide receivers. Additionally, he was the top performer in both the bench press with 19 reps and 20-yard shuttle with 4 flat. Due to his success at the combine, he was interviewed there by multiple teams including the Philadelphia Eagles, Chicago Bears, Tampa Bay Buccaneers and San Francisco 49ers, among others.

=== 2017 season ===
Godwin was selected by the Buccaneers in the third round with the 84th overall pick in the draft. During Week 3 against the Minnesota Vikings, he had his first three career receptions, which went for 44 yards in the 34–17 loss. Due to the likes of DeSean Jackson and Mike Evans, in the first eight weeks of 2017, Godwin had just seven receptions on ten targets. However, his workload picked up in the final eight weeks. During Week 10, he had 68 yards on five receptions in a win 15–10 against the New York Jets and in Week 14, he had the same numbers in a 24–21 loss to the Detroit Lions. In the regular season finale against the New Orleans Saints, Godwin caught nine passes for 111 yards and a touchdown as the Buccaneers won 31–24, earning him National Football Conference (NFC) Offensive Player of the Week.

Godwin finished his rookie year with 34 receptions for 525 yards and one touchdown.

=== 2018 season ===
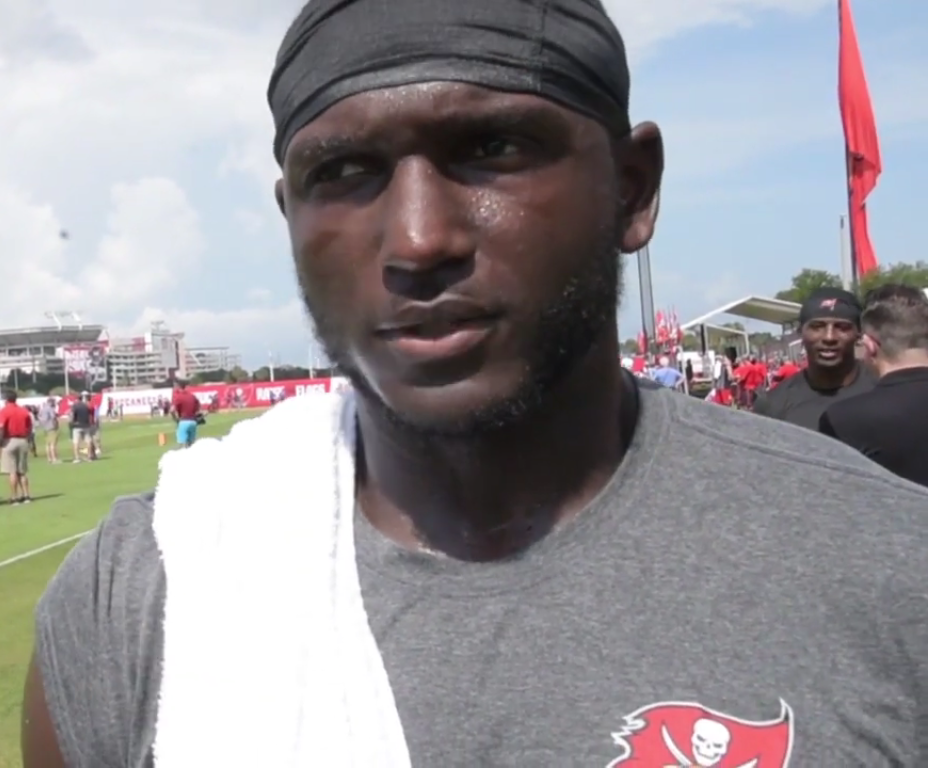
Godwin in 2018

Godwin started the 2018 season off strong with a receiving touchdown in the first three games of the season against the Saints, Eagles, and Pittsburgh Steelers. During Week 10 against the Washington Redskins, he had seven receptions for 103 yards in a 16–3 loss. In Week 13, he had five receptions for 101 yards and a touchdown in a 24–17 victory over the Carolina Panthers. He closed out the regular season strong with six receptions for 114 receiving yards and two touchdowns against the Atlanta Falcons in Week 17.

Godwin finished his second season with 59 receptions for 842 yards and seven touchdowns.

=== 2019 season ===
In the season-opener against the 49ers, Godwin caught three passes for 53 yards and a touchdown in the 31–17 loss. In the next game against the Panthers, he caught eight passes for 121 yards and a touchdown in the 20–14 road victory. Two weeks later against the Los Angeles Rams, he recorded a career-high 12 catches for 172 yards and two touchdowns as the Buccaneers defeated the Rams on the road 55–40. Godwin followed up his big performance in the next game against the Saints, catching seven passes for 125 yards and two touchdowns in a 31–24 road loss. In the next game against the Panthers in London, he caught ten passes for 151 yards in the 37–26 loss. During Week 12 against the Falcons, Godwin recorded a career long 71-yard touchdown reception from quarterback Jameis Winston in route to a career-best 184 yards and two touchdowns in a 35–22 road victory. With that performance, Godwin recorded his first season with at least 1,000 receiving yards. Godwin was named NFC Offensive Player of the Week due to his spectacular performance. In Week 15, during a 38–17 win against the Lions, Godwin caught five passes for 121 yards but injured his hamstring during the third quarter and left the game. On December 17, 2019, Godwin was selected to the 2020 Pro Bowl, the first of his career.

Godwin finished his third season setting new career highs in receptions, receiving yards, and touchdowns with 86 receptions for 1,333 yards and nine touchdowns. He was ranked 38th by his fellow players on the NFL Top 100 Players of 2020.

=== 2020 season ===
For the 2020 season, Godwin gave up his jersey number 12 to new teammate Tom Brady and switched to number 14.

During the season-opener against the Saints, Godwin recorded six receptions for 79 yards but suffered a concussion from a hit by safety D. J. Swearinger which forced him to exit the eventual 34–23 road loss and miss the following week. Godwin returned in Week 3 against the Denver Broncos, in which he recorded five receptions for 64 yards and a touchdown, his first from new Buccaneers quarterback Tom Brady. However, Godwin left the eventual 28–10 road victory with a hamstring injury. He ended up missing the next two games. During a Week 8 45–20 road victory over the Las Vegas Raiders, Godwin recorded nine catches for 88 yards and a touchdown but suffered a fracture to his left index finger while making the touchdown catch. He underwent surgery two days later and would miss the next game. During Week 12, Godwin hauled in 8 of 9 targets for 97 yards as the Buccaneers narrowly lost, 27–24, to their eventual Super Bowl opponent, the Kansas City Chiefs. During a Week 16 47–7 road victory over the Lions, he recorded five catches for 84 yards and a touchdown. In the regular-season finale against the Falcons, Godwin recorded five catches for 133 yards and two touchdowns in the 44–27 victory.

Godwin finished the regular season with 65 receptions for 840 yards and seven touchdowns in 12 games and starts. He was ranked 81st by his fellow players on the NFL Top 100 Players of 2021.

==== 2020 postseason ====
In the Wild Card Round of the 2020–21 NFL playoffs against the Washington Football Team, Godwin recorded five catches for 79 yards and his first playoff touchdown during the 31–23 road victory. During the Divisional Round against the Saints, he was held to four catches for 34 yards in a 30–20 road victory. In the NFC Championship against the Green Bay Packers, Godwin recorded five catches for 110 yards and a six-yard rush as the Buccaneers defeated the Packers on the road by a score of 31–26 to advance to Super Bowl LV. During the Super Bowl, he recorded two catches for nine yards as the Buccaneers beat the Chiefs by a score of 31–9.

=== 2021 season ===
On March 9, 2021, the Buccaneers placed the franchise tag (worth $15.9 million) on Godwin, which he signed on March 18.

During the season-opening 31–29 victory over the Dallas Cowboys, Godwin recorded nine catches for 105 yards and a touchdown, including a critical 24-yard reception on Tampa's final offensive possession to put them within range for kicker Ryan Succop to kick a game-winning 36-yard field goal. In the next game against the Falcons, Godwin recorded four receptions for 62 yards and a touchdown as the Buccaneers won by a score of 48–25. The following week against the Rams, Godwin had six receptions for 74 yards as well as a carry for two yards and his first career rushing touchdown. During a Week 7 38–3 victory over the Bears, he recorded eight receptions for 111 yards and a touchdown. In the next game against the Saints, Godwin recorded eight receptions for 140 yards and a touchdown during the 36–27 road loss. During a Week 11 30–10 victory over the New York Giants, Godwin recorded six receptions for 65 yards and a touchdown to go along with a seven-yard carry. During a Week 13 30–17 road victory over the Falcons, Godwin recorded a career-best and franchise record-setting 15 receptions for 143 yards as well as a nine-yard carry.

On December 19, 2021, Godwin tore his ACL and sprained his MCL in the Buccaneers' Week 15 9–0 shutout loss against the Saints, prematurely ending his season. Godwin finished the season with 98 catches for 1,103 yards and five touchdowns to go along with four carries for 21 yards and a touchdown.

=== 2022 season ===
On March 9, 2022, the Buccaneers placed the franchise tag on Godwin for the second consecutive season. A week later, Godwin and the Buccaneers agreed to a three-year deal worth $60 million, with $40 million guaranteed at signing. In Week 12 against the Browns, Godwin had 12 receptions for 110 yards and a touchdown in the loss. In Week 17 against the Panthers, he had nine receptions for 120 yards in the victory. He finished the 2022 season with 104 receptions for 1,023 yards and three touchdowns in 15 games and 13 starts.

=== 2023 season ===
In Week 4 of the 2023 season, Godwin had eight receptions for 114 yards in the victory over the Saints. In Week 15 against the Packers, he had ten receptions for 155 yards in the win. In the 2023 season, he had 83 receptions for 1,024 yards and two touchdowns. He started all 17 games.

In the Wild Card Round of the playoffs, Godwin had a receiving touchdown in the win over the Eagles.

=== 2024 season ===
In Week 6 of the 2024 season, against the Saints, Godwin had 11 receptions for 125 yards and two touchdowns in the 51–27 win. In Week 7 against the Baltimore Ravens, Godwin had suffered a left ankle injury late in the 4th quarter, requiring him to be carted off the field. The injury was later confirmed to be an ankle dislocation. Godwin underwent surgery, which caused him to miss the remainder of the season. He finished the 2024 season with 50 receptions for 576 yards and five touchdowns in seven games.

=== 2025 season ===
On March 11, 2025, Godwin signed a three-year, $66 million extension with the Buccaneers. On June 12, 2025, Godwin announced his intention to change the name on the back of his jersey to "Godwin Jr." to honor his late father. He finished the 2025 season with 33 receptions for 360 yard and two touchdowns.

== Career statistics ==
=== NFL ===
Legend
	Won the Super Bowl
**Bold**	Career high

==== Regular season ====
Year	Team	Games		Receiving					Rushing					Fumbles	
Year	Team	GP	GS	Rec	Yds	Avg	Lng	TD	Att	Yds	Avg	Lng	TD	Fum	Lost
2017	TB	16	2	34	525	15.4	70	1	0	0	0.0	0	0	0	0
2018	TB	16	5	59	842	14.3	48	7	0	0	0.0	0	0	**4**	1
2019	TB	14	14	86	**1,333**	**15.5**	**71**	**9**	1	8	8.0	8	0	0	0
2020	TB	12	12	65	840	12.9	47	7	0	0	0.0	0	0	1	0
2021	TB	14	14	98	1,103	11.3	44	5	**4**	21	5.3	9	**1**	2	**2**
2022	TB	15	13	**104**	1,023	9.8	44	3	3	5	1.7	2	0	2	**2**
2023	TB	**17**	**17**	83	1,024	12.3	47	2	**4**	**38**	**9.5**	**19**	**1**	0	0
2024	TB	7	7	50	576	11.5	55	5	1	2	2.0	2	0	1	0
2025	TB	9	6	33	360	10.9	59	2	0	0	0.0	0	0	0	0
2026	TB	6	3	23	216	9.4	30	0	3	18	6.0	12	0	0	0
Career		126	93	635	7,842	12.3	71T	41	16	92	5.8	19	2	10	5

==== Postseason ====
Year	Team	Games		Receiving					Rushing					Fumbles	
Year	Team	GP	GS	Rec	Yds	Avg	Lng	TD	Att	Yds	Avg	Lng	TD	Fum	Lost
2020	TB	**4**	**4**	**16**	**232**	**14.5**	**52**	**1**	**1**	**6**	**6.0**	**6**	0	0	0
2021	TB	0	0	Did not play due to injury											
2022	TB	1	1	10	85	8.5	16	0	—	—	—	—	—	0	0
2023	TB	2	2	8	85	10.6	23	**1**	—	—	—	—	—	0	0
2024	TB	0	0	Did not play due to injury											
Career		7	7	34	402	11.8	52	2	1	6	6.0	6	0	0	0

=== College ===
Season	Team	GP	Receiving				
Season	Team	GP	Rec	Yds	Avg	Lng	TD
2014	Penn State	13	26	338	13.0	72T	2
2015	Penn State	13	69	1,101	16.0	56	5
2016	Penn State	14	59	982	16.6	72T	11
Career		40	154	2,421	15.8	72T	18

== Career highlights ==
=== Awards and honors ===
NFL

- Super Bowl champion (LV)
- Second-team All-Pro (2019)
- Pro Bowl (2019)
- 2× NFL Top 100 — 38th 2020), 81st (2021)

College

- Big Ten All-Freshman Team (2014)
- Third-team All-Big Ten (2016)

=== Buccaneers franchise records ===
- Most receptions in a game: 15 (2021, Week 13 vs. Atlanta Falcons)

== Personal life ==
Godwin married his high school sweetheart Mariah DelPercio in 2021.

In 2019, Godwin and DelPercio launched their Team Godwin Foundation which aims to make an impact for pets in need by providing financial assistance to local shelter and rescue groups.
