= Tyler Davis (placekicker) =

American football player (born 1994)

No. 9
- Position: Placekicker

Personal information
- Born: September 29, 1994 (age 32); St. Charles, Illinois, U.S.
- Listed height: 5 ft 10 in (1.78 m)
- Listed weight: 192 lb (87 kg)

Career information
- High school: St. Charles North (St. Charles, Illinois)
- College: Penn State
- NFL draft: 2018: undrafted

Career history
- Buffalo Bills (2018)*
- * Offseason or practice squad member only

Awards and highlights
- Vlade Award (2016); First-team All-Big Ten (2016); Fiesta Bowl champion (2017)

Tyler Dale Davis (born September 29, 1994) is an American former football placekicker. He played college football at Penn State of the Big Ten Conference.

== Early life ==
Davis went to St. Charles North High School in St. Charles, Illinois, but did not participate in football. However, he played for his high school soccer team, and participated at the U.S. Soccer Development Academy. During his sophomore year of high school, he had to sit out the year due to a car crash. He came back in his junior year and scored a school record with 25 goals.

== College career ==
Davis started his college career at Bradley University, where he did not play football but soccer. After a year at Bradley, Tyler transferred to Penn State, where he walked on to the football team as a placekicker.

During the 2015 season, Davis went a perfect 8 for 8 on field goals and 11 for 11 for extra points. He shared kicking duties that year with freshman Joey Julius. During his junior season, he went 22 for 24 on FGs (both misses being blocked), and remained perfect with extra points going 55/55. He finished the regular season with 121 points in total and received All-Big Ten honors.

In his senior season, Davis struggled only going 9 of 17 and only making two kicks from 40 yards or beyond. In the Fiesta Bowl, Penn State was up a touchdown and Davis had a chance to secure the Penn State win with a 45-yard field goal, but pulled the kick. Penn State went on to win the game.

== Professional career ==
Pre-draft measurables
Height	Weight	Arm length	Hand span	Wingspan
5 ft 9 7/8 in (1.77 m)	192 lb (87 kg)	28 1/8 in (0.71 m)	8 7/8 in (0.23 m)	5 ft 10 1/8 in (1.78 m)
All values from Pro Day

After going undrafted in the 2018 NFL draft, Davis signed with the Buffalo Bills as an undrafted free agent on May 11, 2018. He was waived on August 21, 2018.
