= Anthony Zettel =

American football player (born 1992)

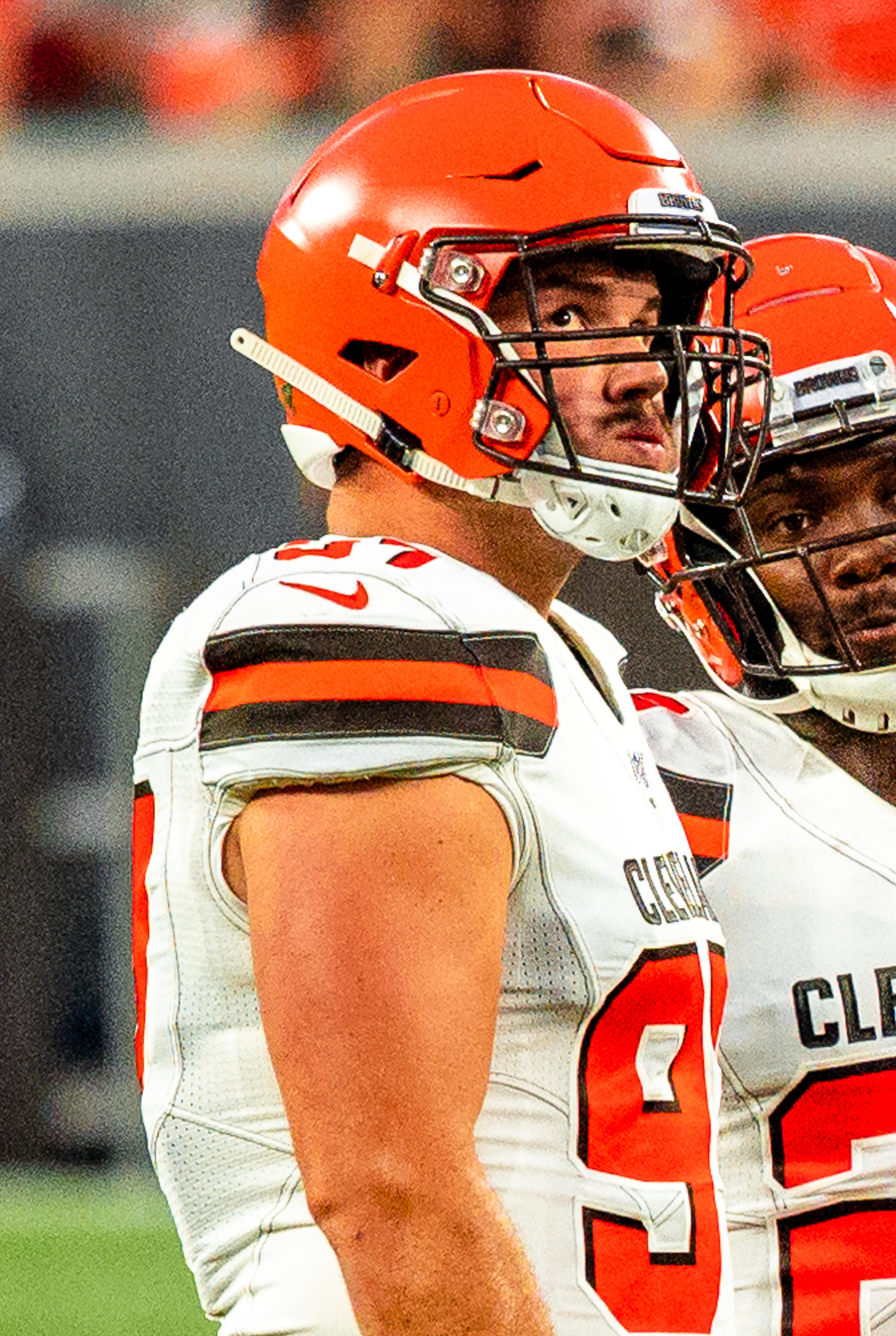
- Zettel with the Cleveland Browns in 2019

No. 69, 97, 90, 92, 67
- Position: Defensive end

Personal information
- Born: August 9, 1992 (age 34); West Branch, Michigan, U.S.
- Listed height: 6 ft 4 in (1.93 m)
- Listed weight: 275 lb (125 kg)

Career information
- High school: Ogemaw Heights (West Branch, Michigan)
- College: Penn State
- NFL draft: 2016: 6th round, 202nd overall pick

Career history
- Detroit Lions (2016–2017); Cleveland Browns (2018); Cincinnati Bengals (2019); San Francisco 49ers (2019); Minnesota Vikings (2020)*; New Orleans Saints (2020); San Francisco 49ers (2021)*
- * Offseason or practice squad member only

Awards and highlights
- First-team All-Big Ten (2014)

Career NFL statistics
- Total tackles: 76
- Sacks: 7.5
- Forced fumbles: 1
- Fumble recoveries: 1
- Stats at Pro Football Reference

Anthony Joseph Zettel (born August 9, 1992) is an American former professional football player who was a defensive end in the National Football League (NFL). He played college football for the Penn State Nittany Lions. He was selected by the Detroit Lions in the sixth round of the 2016 NFL draft.

== Early life ==
Zettel attended Ogemaw Heights High School in West Branch, Michigan, where he was a first-team all-state selection as a senior. He recorded 82 solo tackles, 25 assisted tackles and dropped the quarterback in the backfield seven times as a senior.

Zettel also lettered in baseball, basketball and track & field at Ogemaw Heights. As a senior in track, he set the Michigan high school state record in the shot put with a toss of 61 feet 8 inches (18.80 meters), earning his second straight state championship and breaking both the school record (60'9") and the Division II state record (58'8"). That same year, he finished second in the discus with a heave of 175 feet 4 inches (53.44 meters). He also participated in sprints, running the 100-meter dash in 11.55 seconds and helping Ogemaw's 400m sprint relay post a season-low 45.95 in 2010.

Zettel was rated as a four-star recruit and was listed as the nation's No. 6 prep defensive end by Rivals.com.

== College career ==
Zettel played inside and outside during a 2014 first-team All-Big Ten Conference season at Penn State and recorded 17 tackles for loss, eight sacks, and three interceptions. He was moved inside in 2015 and his production dipped a bit with 47 tackles, 11 for loss, four sacks and six pass breakups.

== Professional career ==
Pre-draft measurables
Height	Weight	Arm length	Hand span	40-yard dash	10-yard split	20-yard split	20-yard shuttle	Three-cone drill	Vertical jump	Broad jump	Bench press
6 ft 3 7/8 in (1.93 m)	277 lb (126 kg)	31 1/8 in (0.79 m)	9 1/2 in (0.24 m)	4.81 s	1.66 s	2.78 s	4.39 s	7.63 s	30.5 in (0.77 m)	9 ft 1 in (2.77 m)	28 reps
All values from NFL Combine

=== Detroit Lions ===
Zettel was selected in the sixth round (202nd overall) by the Detroit Lions in the 2016 NFL draft. He recorded his first career sack against New York Giants quarterback Eli Manning in Week 15 of the 2016 NFL season.

On September 5, 2018, Zettel was waived by the Lions.

=== Cleveland Browns ===
On September 6, 2018, Zettel was claimed off waivers by the Cleveland Browns. He was released during final roster cuts on August 31, 2019.

=== Cincinnati Bengals ===
On October 17, 2019, Zettel was signed by the Cincinnati Bengals. He was waived on October 21, but re-signed on October 23. He was waived on December 17, 2019.

=== San Francisco 49ers (first stint) ===
On December 23, 2019, the San Francisco 49ers signed Zettel. Zettel reached Super Bowl LIV with the 49ers, but the team was defeated by the Kansas City Chiefs.

=== Minnesota Vikings ===
On March 25, 2020, Zettel signed with the Minnesota Vikings. He was released on September 2, 2020.

=== New Orleans Saints ===
On September 19, 2020, Zettel was signed to the practice squad of the New Orleans Saints practice squad. He was elevated to the active roster on December 5 for the team's week 13 game against the Atlanta Falcons, and reverted to the practice squad after the game. He was released on January 11, 2021, but re-signed with the practice squad on January 13. Zettel was released again on January 16.

=== San Francisco 49ers (second stint) ===
On July 27, 2021, Zettel signed with the 49ers.

On August 6, 2021, Zettel announced his retirement from professional football.
