= 2012 Penn State Nittany Lions football team =

American college football season

2012 Penn State Nittany Lions football
- Conference: Big Ten Conference
- Leaders Division
- Record: 8–4 (6–2 Big Ten)
- Head coach: Bill O'Brien (1st season)
- Offensive scheme: Spread option
- Defensive coordinator: Ted Roof (1st season)
- Base defense: 4–3
- Captain: Game Captains
- Home stadium: Beaver Stadium

2012 Big Ten Conference football standings
	Conf.			Overall
Team	W		L	W		L
Legends Division
No. 25 Nebraska xy	7	–	1	10	–	4
No. 24 Michigan	6	–	2	8	–	5
No. 17 Northwestern	5	–	3	10	–	3
Michigan State	3	–	5	7	–	6
Iowa	2	–	6	4	–	8
Minnesota	2	–	6	6	–	7
Leaders Division
No. 3 Ohio State* x	8	–	0	12	–	0
Penn State*	6	–	2	8	–	4
Wisconsin y$	4	–	4	8	–	6
Purdue	3	–	5	6	–	7
Indiana	2	–	6	4	–	8
Illinois	0	–	8	2	–	10
Championship: Wisconsin 70, Nebraska 31
$ – BCS representative as conference champion; x – Division champion/co-champions; * Ohio State and Penn State ineligible for conference championship game and post-season bowl games due to NCAA sanctions.; Rankings from AP Poll

The 2012 Penn State Nittany Lions football team represented the Pennsylvania State University in the 2012 NCAA Division I FBS football season. The team was coached by Bill O'Brien in his first season and played its home games in Beaver Stadium in University Park, Pennsylvania, US. It was a member of the Big Ten Conference and played in the Leaders Division. Penn State was ineligible to play in a bowl game for the 2012 season due to sanctions imposed in wake of the Penn State child sex abuse scandal.

O'Brien was hired as Penn State's 15th head football coach, replacing Hall of Fame coach, Joe Paterno. He was introduced as the head coach at a press conference on January 7, 2012. The team added player names to the back of their jerseys to recognize the players who stayed with the program despite adversity, and also wore a blue ribbon to support child abuse victims.

After losing their first two games, the Nittany Lions finished their season winning eight of their final 10 to finish with a record of eight wins and four losses (8–4).

== Schedule ==
Date	Time	Opponent	Site	TV	Result	Attendance	Source
September 1	12:00 p.m.	Ohio*	Beaver Stadium; University Park, PA	ESPN	L 14–24	97,186	
September 8	12:00 p.m.	at Virginia*	Scott Stadium; Charlottesville, VA	ABC	L 16–17	56,087	
September 15	3:30 p.m.	Navy*	Beaver Stadium; University Park, PA	ABC/ESPN2	W 34–7	98,792	
September 22	3:30 p.m.	Temple*	Beaver Stadium; University Park, PA	ABC/ESPN2	W 24–13	93,680	
September 29	12:00 p.m.	at Illinois	Memorial Stadium; Champaign, IL	ESPN	W 35–7	46,734	
October 6	12:00 p.m.	No. 24 Northwestern^{†}	Beaver Stadium; University Park, PA	ESPN	W 39–28	95,769	
October 20	8:00 p.m.	at Iowa	Kinnick Stadium; Iowa City, IA	BTN	W 38–14	70,585	
October 27	5:30 p.m.	No. 9 Ohio State	Beaver Stadium; University Park, PA (rivalry)	ESPN	L 23–35	107,818	
November 3	3:30 p.m.	at Purdue	Ross–Ade Stadium; West Lafayette, IN	ESPNU	W 34–9	40,098	
November 10	3:30 p.m.	at No. 18 Nebraska	Memorial Stadium; Lincoln, NE	ABC	L 23–32	85,527	
November 17	12:00 p.m.	Indiana	Beaver Stadium; University Park, PA	BTN	W 45–22	90,358	
November 24	3:30 p.m.	Wisconsin	Beaver Stadium; University Park, PA	ESPN2	W 24–21 ^{OT}	93,505	
*Non-conference game; ^{†}Homecoming; Rankings from AP Poll released prior to the game; All times are in Eastern time

== Coaching staff ==
- Bill O'Brien – head coach and offensive coordinator
- Jim Bernhardt– special assistant/player development
- John Butler – defensive backs
- Craig Fitzgerald – strength and conditioning
- Charlie Fisher – quarterbacks coach
- Stan Hixon – assistant head coach and wide receivers
- Larry Johnson – defensive line
- Charles London – running backs and recruiting coordinator
- Mac McWhorter – offensive line
- Ted Roof – defensive coordinator
- John Strollo – tight ends
- Ron Vanderlinden – linebackers
- Brian Bell – Assistant Strength and Conditioning

== Roster ==
Wide receiver Shawney Kersey left the team on September 12, 2012 for "personal reasons". On September 28, 2012, quarterback and tight end Paul Jones left the Penn State football team.

2012 Penn State Nittany Lions football team roster
Players
Coaches
Offense

Pos.	#	Name	Class
TB	1	Bill Belton	So
QB	2	Shane McGregor	Sr
WR	6	Shane Phillips	Fr
WR	7	Eugene Lewis	Fr
WR	8	Allen Robinson	So
RB	9	Michael Zordich	Sr
QB	11	Matt McGloin	Sr
QB	12	Steven Bench	Fr
WR	13	Tyler Lucas	Fr
QB	14	Garrett Venuto	Jr
WR	15	Alex Kenney	So
WR	17	Matthew Mege	Jr
TE	18	Jesse James	Fr
WR	20	Malik Golden	Fr
WR	21	Trevor Williams	Fr
TB	22	Akeel Lynch	Fr
TB	24	Derek Day	Sr
TB	26	Curtis Dukes	Jr
RB	28	Zach Zwinak	So
FB	30	Andre Dupree	Jr
FB	32	Jack Haffner	Fr
RB	33	Colin Bryan	Fr
FB	34	Dominic Salamone	Fr
FB	35	Pat Zerbe	Jr
RB	36	Deron Thompson	Fr
WR	37	Evan Lewis	Sr
FB	41	J.R. Refice	Jr
FB	45	P.J. Byers	Sr
G	50	Anthony Stanko	Fr
C	54	Matt Stankiewtich	Sr
C	55	Wendy Laurent	Fr
G, OT	56	Anthony Alosi	Fr
OT	58	Adam Gress	Jr
C	60	Ty Howle	Sr
C	62	Frank Figueroa	Jr
G	64	John Urschel	Jr
C	65	Miles Dieffenbach	So
G	66	Angelo Mangiro	Fr
G	68	Bryan Davie	So
OT	70	Nate Cadogan	Jr
G	73	Mark Arcidiacono	Jr
G	75	Eric Shrive	Jr
OT	76	Donovan Smith	Fr
G	77	Patrick Christie	So
OT	78	Mike Farrell	Sr
OT	79	Kevin Blanchard	Fr
WR	80	Matt Zanellato	Fr
TE	82	Brian Irvin	Sr
TE	83	Brent Wilkerson	Fr
TE	84	Matt Lehman	Jr
WR	85	Brandon Moseby-Felder	Jr
TE	86	Bryce Wilson	Fr
TE	87	Kyle Carter	Fr
WR	88	Jonathan Warner	Fr
TE	89	Garry Gilliam	Jr

Defense

Pos.	#	Name	Class
CB	2	Jake Kiley	Fr
CB	3	Da'Quan Davis	Fr
CB	4	Adrian Amos	So
LB	5	Nyeem Wartman	Fr
LB	6	Gerald Hodges	Sr
S	7	Stephen Obeng-Agyapong	Jr
LB	8	Gary Wooten	Fr
S	10	Malcolm Willis	Jr
CB	12	Stephon Morris	Sr
S	14	Jordan Lucas	Fr
CB	14	Mike Wallace	Jr
CB	15	Patrick Flanagan	So
CB	16	Devin Pryor	So
DE	18	Deion Barnes	Fr
S	21	Bryant Harper	Fr
LB	22	T.J. Rhattigan	Fr
S	23	Ryan Keiser	So
S	27	Jacob Fagnano	Sr
S	29	Jeff Cully	Jr
LB	30	Charles Idemudia	Fr
DE	31	Brad Bars	So
LB	33	Michael Yancich	Sr
LB	38	Ben Kline	Fr
CB	39	Jesse Della Valle	So
LB	40	Glenn Carson	Jr
LB	42	Michael Mauti	Sr
LB	43	Mike Hull	So
LB	46	Adam Cole	Fr
DL	47	Jordan Hill	Sr
DE	48	Jordan Kerner	Fr
LB	49	Brennan Franklin	Fr
LB	51	Drew Boyce	Fr
DE	52	Brent Smith	Fr
DT	53	Derek Dowrey	Fr
LB	54	James Van Fleet	Sr
DE	59	Pete Massaro	Sr
DT	72	Brian Gaia	Fr
DT	84	Kyle Baublitz	So
DE	86	C.J. Olaniyan	So
DT	88	Tyrone Smith	So
DE	90	Sean Stanley	Sr
DT	91	DaQuan Jones	Jr
DE	92	Albert Hall	Fr
DT	93	James Terry	Sr
DE	94	Evan Schwan	Fr
DE	95	Carl Nassib	Fr
DT	96	Cody Castor	Sr
DE	98	Anthony Zettel	Fr
DT	99	Austin Johnson	Fr

Special teams

Pos.	#	Name	Class
P	29	Reynolds Parthemore	Fr
P	32	Joe Baker	Sr
LS	44	Michael Fuhrman	Sr
P	45	Alex Butterworth	Jr
K	48	Kevin DiSanto	So
LS	57	Emery Etter	Jr
LS	63	Joe Marvin	Fr
PK	97	Sam Ficken	So

Head coach

- Bill O'Brien (head coach/offensive coordinator)

Coordinators/assistant coaches

- Ted Roof (defensive coordinator)
- Stan Hixon (assistant head coach/wide receivers)
- John Butler (Secondary coach)
- Charlie Fisher (quarterbacks coach)
- Larry Johnson (defensive line coach)
- Charles London (running backs coach)
- Mac McWhorter (offensive line coach)
- John Strollo (tight ends coach)
- Ron Vanderlinden (linebackers coach)
- Craig Fitzgerald (strength and conditioning coach)
- Tim Kelly (graduate assistant)

Legend

- (C) Team captain
- (S) Suspended
- (I) Ineligible
- Injured
- Redshirt

Roster
Last update: October 20, 2012

== Game summaries ==
=== September 1 vs. Ohio ===
Penn State vs. Ohio -Game Summary

Quarter	1	2	3	4	Total
Ohio	0	3	14	7	24
Penn State	7	7	0	0	14

at Beaver Stadium

- Date: September 1
- Game time: 12:00 p.m. EDT
- Game attendance: 97,186
- TV announcers (ESPN): Dave Pasch, Brian Griese and Jenn Brown

Game information

First quarter

- PSU- Bill Belton 6-yard pass from Matt McGloin, Ficken XP good, 0:03 (PSU 7–0)

Second quarter

- Ohio- Matt Weller 22-yard field goal, 10:22 (PSU 7–3)
- PSU- Matt Lehman 14-yard pass from Matt McGloin, Ficken XP good, 1:29 (PSU 14–3)

Third quarter

- Ohio- Landon Smith 43-yard pass from Tyler Tettleton, Weller XP good, 10:40 (PSU 14–10)
- Ohio- Tyler Tettleton 1-yard run, Weller XP good, 3:49 (Ohio 17–14)

Fourth quarter

- Ohio- Donte Foster 5-yard pass from Tyler Tettleton, Weller WP good, 2:55 (Ohio 24–14)

Top passer

- Matt McGloin- 27/48, 260 yards, 2 TD, INT

Top rusher

- Bill Belton- 13 rushes, 53 yards

Top receiver

- Allen Robinson- 9 catches, 97 yards

The Ohio University Bobcats spoiled head coach Bill O'Brien's PSU debut defeating the Nittany Lions 24–14. Penn State led 14–3 at the half due to passing touchdowns by QB Matt McGloin to Bill Belton (6 yard) and Matt Lehman (14 yard). Ohio came out of the half-time intermission with 21 unanswered points from passing scores from QB Tyler Tettleton to Landon Smith (43 yard) and Donte Foster (5 yard) and a Tettleton run (1 yard). Penn State committed several costly turnovers including a muffed punt by linebacker Gerald Hodges which set up an Ohio TD and an interception thrown with a minute left by Matt McGloin which essentially put the nail in the coffin. Beau Blankenship led the way for the Bobcats rushing for 109 yards on 31 carries and catching 7 passes for 72 yards. Allen Robinson led the Lions catching 9 passes for 92 yards. Penn State tight end Kyle Carter also caught 6 passes for 72 yards.

=== September 8 at Virginia ===
Penn State at Virginia -Game Summary

Quarter	1	2	3	4	Total
Penn State	7	0	0	9	16
Virginia	0	3	7	7	17

at Scott Stadium

- Date: September 8
- Game time: 12:00 p.m. EDT
- Game attendance: 56,087
- TV announcers (ABC): Mike Patrick, Ed Cunningham, Jerry Punch

Game information

First quarter

- PSU- Kyle Carter 8-yard pass from Matt McGloin, Ficken XP good, 8:33 (PSU 7–0)

Second quarter

- UVA- Drew Jarrett 46-yard field goal, 3:56 (PSU 7–3)

Third quarter

- UVA- Jeremiah Mathis 1-yard pass from Michael Rocco, Jarrett XP good, 9:22 (UVA 10–7)

Fourth quarter

- PSU- Allen Robinson 30-yard pass from Matt McGloin, Ficken XP blocked, 13:10 (PSU 13–10)
- PSU- Sam Ficken 32-yard field goal, 10:55 (PSU 16–10)
- UVA- Jake McGee 6-yard pass from Michael Rocco, Jarrett XP good, 1:28 (UVA 17–16)

Top passer

- Matt McGloin- 19/35, 197 yards, 2 TD

Top rusher

- Derek Day- 18 carries, 47 yards

Top receiver

- Allen Robinson- 10 catches, 89 yards, TD

Penn State was without starting running back Bill Belton due to injury, so senior Derek Day got the start. Penn State's opening drive of the game lasted 17 plays and 75 yards and took up about 6 minutes resulting in an 8-yard TD pass from QB Matt McGloin to Kyle Carter. Their first-half offense was thwarted, however, when they could not convert on 2 FG attempts. Drew Jarrett's 46-yard FG put Virginia on the scoreboard with 3:56 remaining in the first half. True freshman Steven Bench took over QB duties for Penn State late in the first half when McGloin left the field after being hit in the elbow on 2 consecutive series.
Virginia's opening drive of the second half resulted in a 1-yard TD pass from QB Michael Rocco to Jeremiah Mathis. Penn State's FG woes continued in the third quarter when Sam Ficken missed a 20-yard FG which would have tied the game. In the fourth quarter, McGloin completed a long pass to Allen Robinson, who made the diving catch but was shaken up after the play. Ficken's PAT attempt was blocked. Penn State's final scoring drive began when Michael Mauti recovered a Virginia fumble deep in UVA territory. On the ensuing drive, Ficken attempted a 32-yard field goal and, for the first time on the day, made it. Rocco's 6-yard pass to Jake McGee and the ensuing PAT gave Virginia a 1-point lead with 1:28 remaining in the contest. Ficken missed a 43-yard field goal as time expired.

=== September 15 vs. Navy ===
Penn State vs. Navy -Game Summary

Quarter	1	2	3	4	Total
Navy	0	0	0	7	7
Penn State	14	6	7	7	34

at Beaver Stadium

- Date: September 15
- Game time: 3:30 p.m. EDT
- Game attendance: 98,792
- TV: ESPN2/ABC

Game information

First quarter

- PSU- Jesse James 2-yard pass from Matt McGloin, Ficken XP good, 11:25 (PSU 7–0)
- PSU- Allen Robinson 45-yard pass from Matt McGloin, Ficken XP good, 6:40 (PSU 14–0)

Second quarter

- PSU- Allen Robinson 2-yard pass from Matt McGloin, Ficken XP missed, 8:59 (PSU 20–0)

Third quarter

- PSU- Allen Robinson 25-yard pass from Matt McGloin, Ficken XP good, 2:23 (PSU 27–0)

Fourth quarter

- PSU- Mike Hull 74-yard fumble return, Ficken XP good, 14:13 (PSU 34–0)
- Navy- Gee Gee Greene 12-yard run, Sloan XP good, 10:03 (PSU 34–7)

Top passer

- Matt McGloin- 13/21, 231 yards, 4 TD

Top rusher

- Michael Zordich- 11 rushes, 50 yards

Top receiver

- Allen Robinson- 5 catches, 136 yards, 3 TD

Top tackler

- Michael Mauti-12

In the game where new head coach Bill O'Brien celebrated his first victory at Penn State, the Lions overpowered Navy 34–7. Senior quarterback Matt McGloin threw for 231 yards (13–21) and 4 touchdowns including three to sophomore wide receiver Allen Robinson who had 5 catches for 136 yards. For the second consecutive game, Penn State was without starting halfback Bill Belton. Fifth year senior Michael Zordich, who has spent his career at PSU playing fullback carried the ball 11 times for 50 yards. Teammate Curtis Dukes carried 11 times for 47 yards. Navy turned the ball over several times including a fumble which was recovered by Linebacker U Mike Hull and returned for a 74-yard touchdown. Gerald Hodges also recorded an interception.

=== September 22 vs. Temple ===
Penn State vs. Temple -Game Summary

Quarter	1	2	3	4	Total
Temple	0	3	3	7	13
Penn State	7	7	7	3	24

at Beaver Stadium

- Date: September 22
- Game time: 3:30 p.m. EDT
- Game attendance: 93,680
- TV: ESPN2/ABC

Game information

First quarter

- PSU- Allen Robinson 41-yard pass from Matt McGloin, Ficken XP good, 0:06 (PSU 7–0)

Second quarter

- Temple- Brandon McManus 33-yard field goal, 10:29 (PSU 7–3)
- PSU- Matt McGloin 1-yard run, Ficken XP good, 0:22 (PSU 14–3)

Third quarter

- PSU- Matt McGloin 2-yard run, Ficken XP good, 4:57 (PSU 21–3)
- Temple- Brandon McManus 42-yard field goal, 1:37 (PSU 21–6)

Fourth quarter

- PSU- Sam Ficken 21-yard field goal, 2:29 (PSU 24–6)
- Temple- Matt Brown 1-yard pass From Chris Coyer, McManus XP good, 1:33 (PSU 24–13)

Top passer

- Matt McGloin- 24/36, 318 yards, TD, INT

Top rusher

- Zach Zwinak- 18 carries, 94 yards

Top receiver

- Allen Robinson- 5 catches, 82 yards, TD

Top tackler

- Michael Mauti-9

Led by a strong effort by senior quarterback Matt McGloin who ran for two touchdowns and threw for another, the Lions defeated Temple 24–13. With running back Bill Belton out for the third straight game, it was up to McGloin to lead the team around the goal line. He did, with a one-yard rushing touchdown, followed by a two yarder. He also threw a touchdown to sophomore wide receiver Allen Robinson, who recorded 5 catches for 82 yards and a score. Sophomore Zach Zwinak saw the first extensive action of his career at running back; he ran for 94 yards on 18 carries. Fullback Michael Zordich added 15 carries of his own for 75 yards. Kicker Sam Ficken, who had missed 4 field goals and an extra point the previous week, converted on all 3 extra points and a 21-yard field goal. Defensively, the Lions were led by another strong effort from senior linebacker Michael Mauti, who recorded 9 tackles, and defensive tackle Jordan Hill, who added 7 tackles and a sack.

=== September 29 at Illinois ===
Penn State at Illinois -Game Summary

Quarter	1	2	3	4	Total
Penn State	14	7	7	7	35
Illinois	0	0	7	0	7

at Memorial Stadium

- Date: September 29
- Game time: 12:00 p.m. EDT
- Game attendance: 46,734
- TV announcers (ESPN): Dave Pasch, Brian Griese

Game information

First quarter

- PSU- Zach Zwinak 1-yard run, Ficken XP good, 10:41 (PSU 7–0)
- PSU- Matt McGloin 1-yard run, Ficken XP good, 6:29 (PSU 14–0)

Second quarter

- PSU- Matt Lehman 21-yard pass from Matt McGloin, Ficken XP good, 3:11 (PSU 21–0)

Third quarter

- ILL- Spencer Harris 22-yard pass from Josh Ferguson, Zalewski XP good, 10:22 (PSU 21–7)
- PSU- Matt McGloin 1-yard run, Ficken XP good 3:15 (PSU 28–7)

Fourth quarter

- PSU- Zach Zwinak 1-yard run, Ficken XP good 14:03 (PSU 35–7)

Top passer

- Matt McGloin- 18/30, 211 yards, TD

Top rusher

- Zach Zwinak- 19 rushes, 100 yards, 2 TD

Top receiver

- Matt Lehman- 5 receptions, 70 yards, TD

Top tacklers

- Gerald Hodges, Glenn Carson- 9

After getting a quick three and out on Penn State's first series, Illinois muffed the punt and set up Penn State with great field position. Kicker Sam Ficken attempted a field goal, which he made, but a running into the kicker penalty on Illinois, Penn State was set up inside the 5-yard line. Zach Zwinak ran the ball for a 1-yard touchdown. Later in the quarter, Matt McGloin ran for a score. Taylor Zalewski missed a short field goal late in the first quarter. Early in the second quarter, Sam Ficken missed a 47 yarder of his own. In the second quarter, Matt McGloin threw a 21-yard touchdown pass to Matt Lehman, his tenth of the year. As Lehman was falling into the end zone, an Illinois defender hammered Lehman helmet to helmet and was ejected. At the end of the first half, quarterback Nathan Scheelhaase threw an interception to Michael Mauti who returned the ball 99 yards and was stopped at the one-yard line with one second left. Sam Ficken's 18 yard was blocked to end the half. On a trick play, receiver Josh Ferguson threw a 22-yard touchdown to Spencer Harris in the third quarter. Matt McGloin capped a long drive late in the third quarter with a 2-yard touchdown run, his second of the game. Michael Mauti intercepted Nathan Scheelhaase for the second time of the day near the end of the third quarter. Zach Zwinak went over the century mark with his second touchdown run of the day early in the fourth quarter to put Penn State up 35–7.

=== October 6 vs. Northwestern ===
Penn State vs. #24 Northwestern -Game Summary

Quarter	1	2	3	4	Total
#24 Northwestern	0	14	14	0	28
Penn State	3	7	7	22	39

at Beaver Stadium

- Date: October 6
- Game time: 12:00 p.m. EDT
- Game attendance: 95,769
- TV announcers (ESPN): Dave Pasch, Brian Griese and Jenn Brown

Game information

First quarter

- PSU- Sam Ficken 21-yard field goal, 3:41 (PSU 3–0)

Second quarter

- PSU- Zach Zwinak 1-yard run, Sam Ficken XP good, 9:34 (PSU 10–0)
- NW- Venric Mark 2-yard run, Jeff Budzien XP good, 6:23 (PSU 10–7)
- NW- Tony Jones 10-yard pass from Trevor Siemian, Jeff Budzien XP good, 0:30 (NW 14–10)

Third quarter

- PSU- Allen Robinson 8-yard pass from Matt McGloin, Sam Ficken XP good, 7:17 (PSU 17–14)
- NW- Kain Colter 10-yard run, Jeff Budzien XP good, 3:12 (NW 21–17)
- NW- Venric Mark 75-yard punt return, Jeff Budzien XP good. 0:50 (NW 28–17)

Fourth quarter

- PSU- Allen Robinson 6-yard pass from Matt McGloin, Michael Zordich run for two-point conversion good, 9:49 (NW 28–25)
- PSU- Matt McGloin 5-yard run, Sam Ficken XP good, 2:37 (PSU 32–28)
- PSU- Michael Zordich 3-yard run, Sam Ficken XP good, 1:30 (PSU 39–28)

Top passer

- Matt McGloin- 35/51, 282 yards, 2 TD

Top rusher

- Zach Zwinak- 28 rushes, 121 yards, TD

Top receiver

- Allen Robinson- 9 receptions, 85 yards, TD

Top tackler

- Gerald Hodges- 11 tackles

In the Lions' first game against a ranked opponent, they defeated Northwestern 39–28 at Beaver Stadium. Penn State won the toss and elected to receive. Their first drive showed promise, but a false start penalty pushed them back and forcing them to punt. Alex Butterworth's punt was downed at the Northwestern 1. The Wildcats were forced into a quick three-and-out. The ensuing drive for the Lions included two fourth down conversions on their way to inside the five-yard line where, rather than risking a third fourth down on the drive, the Nittany Lions settled for a 21-yard field goal try by Sam Ficken. On Penn State's fifth drive of the game, which began at the Northwestern 40, they slowly drove down the field using the no-huddle offense, converting on fourth and short at one point for their third 4th down conversion of the game. The drive was capped by a one-yard touchdown plunge by Zach Zwinak to give Penn State a 10–0 lead. Northwestern's ensuing drive managed to pick up a couple first downs, but ultimately stalled and they were forced to punt for a fifth time. Penn State, however, muffed this punt and Northwestern recovered at the Penn State 17. Three plays later, Northwestern scored its first touchdown of the game on a two-yard run by Venric Mark to make the score 10–7. After another exchange of punts, Penn State drove from its 21-yard line to the Northwestern 34 where the drive stalled and Penn State was forced to 4th and 4. Penn State elected to try to convert its fourth 4th down of the game, but they failed this time. Northwestern took advantage of this to drive down the field, aided by a controversial pass interference call, and scored another touchdown before the half on a Trevor Siemian pass. At the end of the first half, Penn State trailed 14–10.

Northwestern opened the second half on offense and after one first down was forced to punt. Penn State then moved the ball 80 yards in 12 plays and scored a touchdown on an 8-yard pass from Matt McGloin to Allen Robinson to take a 17–14 lead. Northwestern responded in kind with a touchdown scored on a 10-yard run by Kain Colter to put Penn State down again, this time by a score of 21–17. Penn State's next drive also stalled, and the ensuing Penn State punt resulted in a disaster when Northwestern's Venric Mark returned it 75 yards for a touchdown to widen the gap to 28–17. Penn State responded to this score with its own 18 play 82-yard drive that ended on a touchdown pass from McGloin to Robinson on 4th and 4 from the Northwestern 6. A successful two-point rush by Michael Zordich trimmed the deficit to 25–28 with just under 10 minutes to play. Penn State forced a Northwestern three-and-out, but a good Northwestern punt backed up Penn State to its own 15. Penn State drove, in 13 plays, down the field to the Northwestern 4, along the way converting on another 4th down to make it 5 for 6 on 4th downs. On 2nd and Goal, McGloin was stripped of the ball from behind, but managed to fall on it for a loss of one. One 3rd and Goal, McGloin escaped the pass rush and dove into the end zone to give the Lions a 32–28 lead with 2:37 to play. Northwestern had all three timeouts for what ultimately would be its last chance, but ran four plays and turned the ball over on downs. Penn State ran three consecutive handoffs to Michael Zordich, who took the second one all the way to the three and the third into the end zone to make the score 39–28, the final score.

=== October 20 at Iowa ===
Penn State at Iowa -Game Summary

Quarter	1	2	3	4	Total
Penn State	14	10	7	7	38
Iowa	0	0	0	14	14

at Kinnick Stadium

- Date: October 20
- Game time: 8:00 p.m. EDT
- Game attendance: 70,585
- TV announcers (Big Ten Network): Eric Collins, Derek Rackley

Game information

First quarter

- PSU- Jesse James, 31-yard pass from Matt McGloin, Sam Ficken XP good, 7:24 (PSU 7–0)
- PSU- Allen Robinson, 8-yard pass from Matt McGloin, Sam Ficken XP good, 2:43 (PSU 14–0)

Second quarter

- PSU- Sam Ficken, 34-yard field goal, 7:19 (PSU 17–0)
- PSU- Bill Belton, 11-yard run, Sam Ficken XP good, 5:53 (PSU 24–0)

Third quarter

- PSU- Bill Belton, 3-yard run, Sam Ficken XP good, 14:33 (PSU 31–0)

Fourth quarter

- PSU- Bill Belton, 5-yard run, Sam Ficken XP good, 14:25 (PSU 38–0)
- IOWA- Jordon Cotton, 92-yard kickoff return, Mike Meyer XP good, 14:14 (PSU 38–7)
- IOWA- Keenan Davis, 18-yard pass from James Vandenberg, Mike Meyer XP good, 4:11 (PSU 38–14)

Top passer

- Matt McGloin- 26–38, 289 yards, 2 TD

Top rusher

- Bill Belton- 16 rushes, 103 yards, 3 TD

Top receivers

- Kyle Carter- 6 receptions 85 yards; Allen Robinson- 6 receptions, 39 yards, TD

Top tackler

- Jordan Hill- 9 tackles, sack

=== October 27 vs. Ohio State ===
Penn State vs. Ohio State -Game Summary

Quarter	1	2	3	4	Total
#9 Ohio State	0	7	21	7	35
Penn State	0	7	3	13	23

at Beaver Stadium

- Date: October 27
- Game time: 5:30 p.m. EDT
- TV announcers (ESPN): Sean McDonough, Chris Spielman
- ESPN Recap

Game information

First quarter

- No scoring

Second quarter

- PSU- Mike Yancich, blocked punt recovered in end zone, Sam Ficken XP good, 6:15 (PSU 7–0)
- OSU- Carlos Hyde, 1-yard run, Drew Basil XP good, 0:34 (TIE 7–7)

Third quarter

- OSU- Ryan Shazier, 17-yard interception return, Drew Basil XP good, 13:41 (OSU 14–7)
- PSU- Sam Ficken, 27-yard field goal, 9:50 (OSU 14–10)
- OSU- Braxton Miller, 1-yard run, Drew Basil XP good, 3:30 (OSU 21–10)
- OSU- Braxton Miller, 1-yard run, Drew Basil XP good, 0:40 (OSU 28–10)

Fourth quarter

- PSU- Matt Lehman, 2-yard pass from Matt McGloin, two-point conversion attempt failed, 9:49 (OSU 28–16)
- OSU- Jake Stoneburner, 72-yard pass from Braxton Miller, Drew Basil XP good, 6:11 (OSU 35–16)
- PSU- Kyle Carter, 20-yard pass from Matt McGloin, Sam Ficken XP good, 1:41 (OSU 35–23)

Top passer

- Matt McGloin- 27/45, 327 yards, 2 TD, INT

Top rusher

- Zach Zwinak- 12 rushes, 42 yards

Top receiver

- Kyle Carter- 6 receptions, 77 yards, TD

Top tackler

- Gerald Hodges- 14

=== November 3 at Purdue ===
Penn State at Purdue -Game Summary

Quarter	1	2	3	4	Total
Penn State	10	10	14	0	34
Purdue	3	0	0	6	9

at Ross–Ade Stadium

- Date: November 3
- Game time: 3:30 p.m. EDT
- Game attendance: 40,098
- TV announcers (ESPNU): Tom Hart, John Congemi
- ESPN Recap

Game information

First quarter

- PUR- Sam McCartney, 21-yard field goal, 12:59 (PUR 3–0)
- PSU- Sam Ficken, 27-yard field goal, 6:03 (TIE 3–3)
- PSU- Michael Zordich, 6-yard run, Sam Ficken XP good, 3:53 (PSU 10–3)

Second quarter

- PSU- Sam Ficken, 25-yard field goal, 3:47 (PSU 13–3)
- PSU- Michael Zordich, 5-yard run, Sam Ficken XP good, 1:16 (PSU 20–3)

Third quarter

- PSU- Jesse James, 12-yard pass from Matt McGloin, Sam Ficken XP good, 12:19 (PSU 27–3)
- PSU- Brandon Moseby-Felder, 41-yard pass from Matt McGloin, Sam Ficken XP good, 8:28 (PSU 34–3)

Fourth quarter

- PUR- Antavian Edison, 2-yard pass from Caleb TerBush, 0:00 (PSU 34–9)

Top passer

- Matt McGloin- 22/36, 321 yards, 2 TD

Top rusher

- Zach Zwinak- 21 rushes, 134 yards

Top receiver

- Brandon Moseby-Felder- 6 receptions, 129 yards, TD

Top tackler

- Gerald Hodges, Stephon Morris- 6

=== November 10 at Nebraska ===
Penn State at Nebraska -Game Summary

Quarter	1	2	3	4	Total
Penn State	7	13	3	0	23
#18 Nebraska	3	3	14	12	32

at Memorial Stadium

- Date: November 10
- Game time: 3:30 p.m. EDT
- Game attendance: 85,527
- TV announcers (ESPN2/ABC): Sean McDonough, Chris Spielman, Quint Kessenich
- ESPN Recap

Game information

First quarter

- PSU- Zach Zwinak, 50-yard run, Sam Ficken XP good, 13:14 (PSU 7–0)
- NEB- Brett Maher, 32-yard field goal, 6:17 (PSU 7–3)

Second quarter

- NEB- Brett Maher, 27-yard field goal, 12:29 (PSU 7–6)
- PSU- Sam Ficken, 27-yard field goal, 6:58 (PSU 10–6)
- PSU- Jesse James, 10-yard pass from Matt McGloin, Sam Ficken XP good, 2:42 (PSU 17–6)
- PSU- Sam Ficken, 38-yard field goal, 1:08 (PSU 20–6)

Third quarter

- NEB- Imani Cross, 1-yard run, Brett Maher XP good, 11:48 (PSU 20–13)
- NEB- Imani Cross, 2-yard run, Brett Maher XP good, 9:37 (TIE 20–20)
- PSU- Sam Ficken, 38-yard field goal, 6:01 (PSU 23–20)

Fourth quarter

- NEB- Jamal Turner, 5-yard pass from Taylor Martinez, Brett Maher XP good, 10:57 (NEB 27–23)
- NEB- Penalty on Penn State in the end zone, 5:02 (NEB 29–23)
- NEB- Brett Maher, 33-yard field goal, 0:23 (NEB 32–23)

Top passer

- Matt McGloin- 18/37, 240 yards, TD, INT

Top rusher

- Zach Zwinak- 21 rushes, 141 yards, TD

Top receiver

- Allen Robinson- 6 receptions, 97 yards

Top tackler

- Gerald Hodges, Glenn Carson- 14

=== November 17 vs. Indiana ===
Penn State vs. Indiana -Game Summary

Quarter	1	2	3	4	Total
Indiana	0	13	9	0	22
Penn State	7	21	14	3	45

at Beaver Stadium

- Date: November 17
- Game time: 12:00 p.m. EDT
- TV announcers (Big Ten Network): Kevin Kugler, Chris Martin, J. Lehman
- ESPN Recap

Game information

First quarter

- PSU- Allen Robinson, 26-yard pass from Matt McGloin, Sam Ficken XP good, 4:26 (PSU 7–0)

Second quarter

- IU- Mitch Ewald, 26-yard field goal, 14:44 (PSU 7–3)
- IU- Ted Bolser, 2-yard pass from Cameron Coffman, Mitch Ewald XP good, 13:20 (IND 10–7)
- PSU- Allen Robinson, 53-yard pass from Matt McGloin, Sam Ficken XP good, 8:56 (PSU 14–10)
- IND- Mitch Ewald, 44-yard field goal, 7:06 (PSU 14–13)
- PSU- Allen Robinson, 10-yard pass from Matt McGloin, Sam Ficken XP good, 2:25 (PSU 21–13)
- PSU- Zach Zwinak, 16-yard pass from Matt McGloin, Sam Ficken XP good, 0:31 (PSU 28–13)

Third quarter

- IND- Stephen Houston, 79-yard pass from Cameron Coffman, XP failed, 13:04 (PSU 28–19)
- IND- Mitch Ewald, 46-yard field goal, 8:36 (PSU 28–22)
- PSU- Zach Zwinak, 1-yard run, Sam Ficken XP good, 5:33 (PSU 35–22)
- PSU- Michael Zordich, 4-yard run, Sam Ficken XP good, 0:17 (PSU 42–22)

Fourth quarter

- PSU- Sam Ficken, 28-yard field goal, 3:40 (PSU 45–22)

Top passer

- Matt McGloin- 22/32, 397 yards, 4 TD, INT

Top rusher

- Zach Zwinak- 29 rushes, 133 yards, TD

Top receiver

- Allen Robinson- 10 receptions, 197 yards, TD

Top defender

- Gerald Hodges- 12 tackles, interception

Receiver Allen Robinson caught three touchdown passes in the first half. Senior linebackers Michael Mauti and Gerald Hodges each left in the first half due to injury. Hodges subsequently returned and made an interception late in the second quarter where he tipped the ball to himself and made a diving catch. Mauti was expected to miss significant time with a left knee injury. Quarterback Matt McGloin set both a single-season record for most passing yards in school history and broke Zack Mills' record for most career touchdown passes.

=== November 24 vs. Wisconsin ===
Penn State vs. Wisconsin-Game Summary

Quarter	1	2	3	4	OT	Total
Wisconsin	14	0	0	7	0	21
Penn State	7	0	6	8	3	24

at Beaver Stadium

- Date: November 24
- Game time: 3:30 p.m. EDT
- Game attendance: 93,505
- TV: ESPN2
- ESPN Recap

Game information

First quarter

- WIS- Melvin Gordon, 57-yard pass from Curt Phillips, Kyle French XP good, 13:11 (WIS 7–0)
- PSU- Zach Zwinak, 3-yard run, Sam Ficken XP good, 8:17 (TIE 7–7)
- WIS- Montee Ball, 17-yard run, Kyle French XP good, 6:27 (WIS 14–7)

Second quarter

- no scoring

Third quarter

- PSU- Sam Ficken, 23-yard field goal, 10:55 (WIS 14–10)
- PSU- Sam Ficken, 32-yard field goal, 2:58 (WIS 14–13)

Fourth quarter

- PSU- Jesse James, 41-yard pass from Matt McGloin, Zach Zwinak run for two-point conversion, 13:32 (PSU 21–14)
- WIS- Jeff Duckworth, 4-yard pass from Curt Phillips, Kyle French XP good, 0:18 (TIE 21–21)

Overtime

- PSU- Sam Ficken, 36-yard field goal (PSU 24–21)

Top passer

- Matt McGloin- 19/37, 200 yards, TD

Top rusher

- Zach Zwinak- 36 rushes, 179 yards, TD

Top receiver

- Jesse James- 3 receptions, 90 yards, TD

Top defender

- Glenn Carson- 13 tackles, Jordan Hill- 12 tackles, 2 sacks

== Awards ==
Despite the Lions' ineligibility to play in bowl games, several players were named to the All-Conference Team or received other individual awards.

- Bill O'Brien – Big Ten Coach of the Year, National Coach of the Year (ESPN, Maxwell Football Club, Bear Bryant Award)
- Matt McGloin – Burlsworth Trophy (top player in college football who began his career as a walk-on); Honorable Mention All Big Ten
- Zach Zwinak – Honorable Mention All Big Ten
- Allen Robinson – First Team All Big Ten, Richter-Howard Receiver of the Year
- Kyle Carter – First Team All Big Ten
- Matt Stankiewitch – First Team All Big Ten
- John Urschel – First Team All Big Ten
- Mike Farrell – Honorable Mention All Big Ten
- Sean Stanley – Honorable Mention All Big Ten
- Deion Barnes – Honorable Mention All Big Ten, Thompson–Randle El Freshman of the Year
- Jordan Hill – First Team All Big Ten, Big Ten Sportsmanship Honoree
- Michael Mauti – First Team All Big Ten, Butkus-Fitzgerald Linebacker of the Year, First Team All-American (ESPN)
- Gerald Hodges – Second Team All Big Ten
- Adrian Amos – Honorable Mention All Big Ten
- Stephon Morris – Honorable Mention All Big Ten

== Post-season ==
Four players were invited to the 2013 NFL Scouting Combine, held February 20 to 26 at Lucas Oil Stadium in Indianapolis, Indiana: Jordan Hill, Gerald Hodges, Michael Mauti, and Matt Stankiewitch.

=== All-star games ===
Game	Date	Site	Players
2013 Casino del Sol College All-Star Game	January 11, 2013	Kino Veterans Memorial Stadium; Tucson, Arizona	Mike Farrell
2013 NFLPA Collegiate Bowl	January 19, 2013	The Home Depot Center; Carson, California	Michael Zordich; Sean Stanley; Pete Massaro
2013 East–West Shrine Game	January 19, 2013	Tropicana Field; St. Petersburg, Florida	Gerald Hodges; Matt Stankiewitch
2013 Senior Bowl	January 26, 2013	Ladd–Peebles Stadium, Mobile, Alabama	Jordan Hill
2013 Texas vs The Nation	February 2, 2013	Allen, Texas	Matt McGloin
