= Jordan Hill (American football) =

American football player (born 1991)

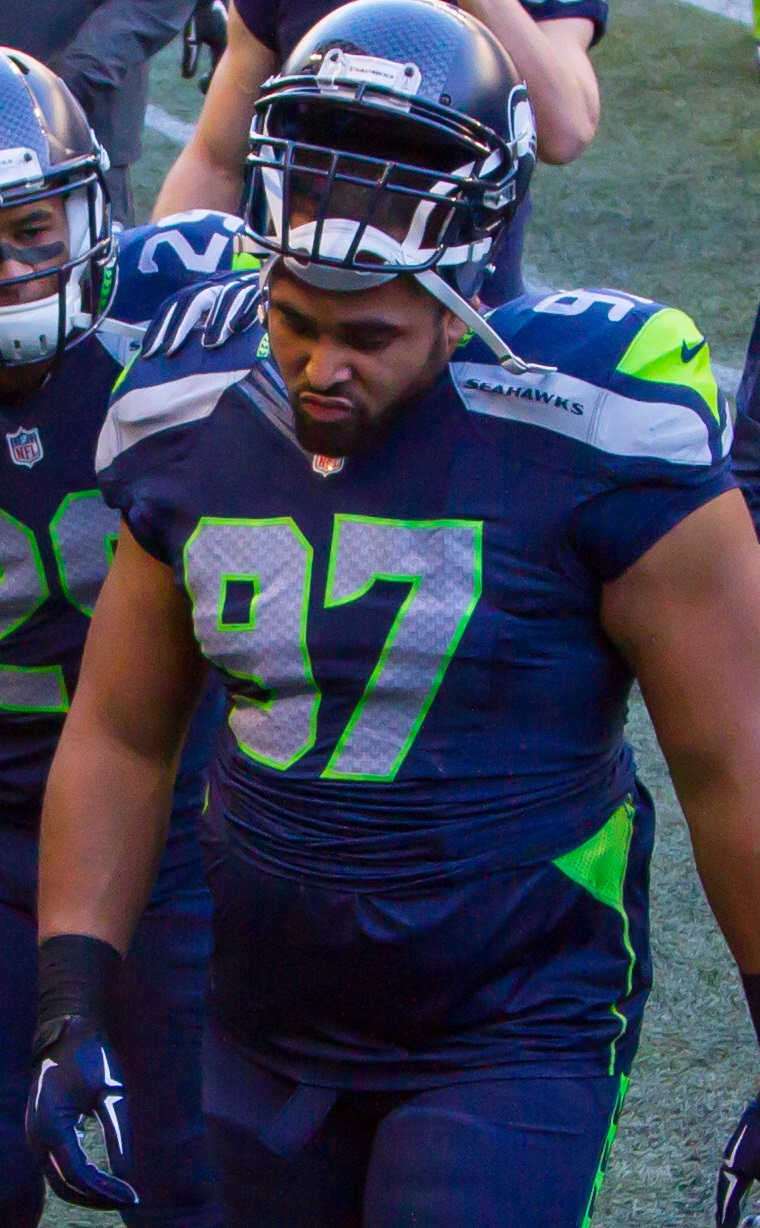
- Hill with the Seattle Seahawks in 2014

No. 97, 79
- Position: Defensive tackle

Personal information
- Born: February 8, 1991 (age 35); Steelton, Pennsylvania, U.S.
- Listed height: 6 ft 1 in (1.85 m)
- Listed weight: 290 lb (132 kg)

Career information
- High school: Steelton-Highspire
- College: Penn State
- NFL draft: 2013: 3rd round, 87th overall pick

Career history
- Seattle Seahawks (2013–2016); Washington Redskins (2016); Jacksonville Jaguars (2016); Detroit Lions (2017)

Awards and highlights
- Super Bowl champion (XLVIII); First-team All-Big Ten (2012); Big Ten Sportsmanship Award (2012)

Career NFL statistics
- Total tackles: 50
- Sacks: 7
- Fumble recoveries: 4
- Interceptions: 1
- Stats at Pro Football Reference

Jordan Thomas Hill (born February 8, 1991) is an American former professional football player who was a defensive tackle in the National Football League (NFL). He was selected by the Seattle Seahawks in the third round of the 2013 NFL draft. He played college football for the Penn State Nittany Lions.

== Early life ==
Hill was born in Harrisburg, Pennsylvania. He attended Steelton Highspire High School in suburban Harrisburg, and played high school football for the Steelton-Highspire Steamrollers. After a senior season which he earned all-state accolades while helping the Steamrollers win a Class A state championship, Penn State defensive line coach Larry Johnson recruited Hill heavily. Although he had offers from Pittsburgh, Rutgers, and Temple, Hill quickly committed to Penn State.

College recruiting
Name	Hometown	School	Height	Weight	40^{‡}	Commit date
Jordan Hill; DL	Steelton, PA	Steelton-Highspire HS	6 ft 3 in (1.91 m)	290 lb (130 kg)	4.7	Jan 5, 2009
Jordan Hill; DL	Recruit ratings: Scout: Rivals: 247Sports:					
Overall recruit ranking: Scout: 49 (DT), 11 (school) Rivals: 39 (PA), 24 (school) 247Sports: 58 (strongside DE), 25 (PA), 987 (national), 15 (school)
‡ Refers to 40-yard dash; Note: In many cases, Scout, Rivals, 247Sports, On3, and ESPN may conflict in their listings of height, weight and 40 time.; In these cases, the average was taken. ESPN grades are on a 100-point scale.; Sources: "2009 Penn State Football Commitment List". Rivals.; "Penn State College Football Recruiting Commits". Scout.; "Scout.com Team Recruiting Rankings". Scout.; "2009 Team Ranking". Rivals.com.; "Penn State 2009 Football Commits". 247Sports.

== College career ==
Hill enrolled in Pennsylvania State University, where he played for the Penn State Nittany Lions football team from 2009 to 2012. He played relatively sparingly in his freshman season, but did record 12 tackles in 8 games, and started four games and played in all 11 during his sophomore year.

As a junior in 2011, Hill led the defensive line by recording 59 tackles including 8 for a loss and 3.5 sacks. Perhaps his best game of the year was against Illinois when he recorded 10 tackles including a tackle for a loss. He earned honorable mention all Big Ten.

In wake of the Penn State child sex abuse scandal, Hill was one of the first Penn State players to come out in support of coach Joe Paterno. "I'm still a big supporter of coach Paterno and he is one of the reasons that I'm here," he said. "All you can really say is no man is perfect at all."

After Penn State's first loss to Ohio University in 2012, Hill, acting as a senior leader, came out and said that the team needed to move forward. Midway through the season, coach Bill O'Brien stumped for Hill and teammates Gerald Hodges and Michael Mauti for several year end awards or for the All-American team.

== Professional career ==
Pre-draft measurables
Height	Weight	Arm length	Hand span	Wingspan	40-yard dash	10-yard split	20-yard split	20-yard shuttle	Three-cone drill	Vertical jump	Broad jump	Bench press
6 ft 1 1/4 in (1.86 m)	303 lb (137 kg)	33 1/2 in (0.85 m)	10 1/4 in (0.26 m)	6 ft 8 1/8 in (2.04 m)	5.02 s	1.76 s	2.83 s	4.51 s	7.49 s	30.0 in (0.76 m)	9 ft 3 in (2.82 m)	28 reps
All values from NFL Combine/Pro Day

=== Seattle Seahawks ===
The Seattle Seahawks chose Hill in the third round with the 87th overall pick in the 2013 NFL draft. On May 10, 2013, he signed a multi-year rookie contract with Seahawks; financial terms were not disclosed at the time of the announcement. He played in 4 games in the 2013 season, recording 7 tackles and 1.5 sacks, ultimately winning a Super Bowl ring in Super Bowl XLVIII.

In 2014, Hill was a small contributor until Brandon Mebane was placed on injured reserve after a Week 10 game against the New York Giants. Over the final 6 games of the regular season (all wins by the Seahawks, with a total of 39 points allowed), Hill recorded 13 tackles and 5.5 sacks. In a week 15 game against the San Francisco 49ers, he had two sacks of quarterback Colin Kaepernick. In week 17, he had half a sack and his first career interception of quarterback Shaun Hill. In this week 17 game, Hill would get injured and ultimately be placed on injured reserve, ending his season as the playoffs started.

On September 3, 2016, he was placed on injured reserve. He was released on October 16, 2016.

=== Washington Redskins ===
On November 8, 2016, Hill was signed by the Washington Redskins. He was waived on November 19, 2016.

=== Jacksonville Jaguars ===
Hill was claimed off waivers by the Jaguars on November 21, 2016.

=== Detroit Lions ===
On March 20, 2017, Hill signed with the Detroit Lions. He was placed on injured reserve on August 27, 2017, and suffering a biceps injury.

== Personal life ==
Hill is the son of Larry and Sue (Dagenhart) Hill. Hill has said that he draws motivation from his father Larry, who has diabetes and suffered from a mild stroke in 2008.

In February 2021, Hill was named the head football coach at Trinity High School, located in Shiremanstown, Pennsylvania. He served as the head coach of Trinity High School through the 2023-2024 high school football season. During his tenure at Trinity he coached alongside former Penn State teammate Michael Mauti. In the 2022-2023 school year Hill and Mauti lead the Trinity Shamrocks to a PIAA District III Class 2A Champsionship. The following season they lead the Shamrocks to another District III Class 2A Champsionship but lost to the Camp Hill Lions.

In May 2024 James Franklin appointed Hill as the Director of Life Skills as a part of Penn State football program. In July 2026 under the direction of new Penn State football coach, Matt Campbell, Hill was made the Director of Player Development. In addition, he gained a secondary title as the Director of the Letterman's Club for Penn State football.
