= 2013 East–West Shrine Game =

- All–Star Bowl Game
East Team	West Team
13	28
Head coach: Jerry Glanville	Head coach: Leeman Bennett
	1	2	3	4	Total
East	0	3	7	3	13
West	7	14	0	7	28
- Date: January 19, 2013
- Season: 2012
- Stadium: Tropicana Field
- Location: St. Petersburg, Florida
- MVP: Chad Bumphis (WR, Mississippi State) & Nigel Malone (CB, Kansas State)
- Referee: Marc Curles
- Attendance: 18,000

United States TV coverage
- Network: NFL Network

The 2013 East–West Shrine Game was the 88th staging of the all-star college football exhibition game featuring NCAA Division I Football Bowl Subdivision players and a few select invitees from Canadian university football. The game featured over 100 players from the 2012 college football season, and prospects for the 2013 draft of the professional National Football League (NFL). In the week prior to the game, scouts from all 32 NFL teams attended. The proceeds from the East–West Shrine Game benefit Shriners Hospitals for Children. Jerry Glanville and Leeman Bennett were named coaches on December 5, 2012. The game was played on January 19, 2013, at Tropicana Field in St. Petersburg, Florida; the West defeated the East, 28–13.

== Players ==
=== East Team ===
==== Offense ====
No.	Name	Position	Height/Weight	School
78	Terron Armstead	OL	6-5/310	Arkansas-Pine Bluff
80	Blake Emory	WR	6-2/195	Auburn
11	Cameron Colby	QB	6-2/205	Louisiana Tech
15	Marcus Davis	WR	6-4/225	Virginia Tech
64	Jordan Devey	OL	6-6/305	Memphis
76	R.J. Dill	OL	6-6/315	Rutgers
83	Corey Fuller	WR	6-3/195	Virginia Tech
12	Ray Graham	RB	5-10/190	Pittsburgh
18	Montel Harris	RB	5-9/208	Temple
73	Garth Heikkinen	OL	6-2 1/2/305	Minnesota Duluth
88	Erik Highsmith	WR	6-3/195	North Carolina
74	Mark Jackson	OL	6-6/330	Glenville State
10	D. C. Jefferson	TE	6-6/250	Rutgers
55	T. J. Johnson	OL	6-5/315	South Carolina
7	Collin Klein	QB	6-5/226	Kansas State
58	Eric Kush	OL	6-4/299	California (PA)
44	Chris Pantale	TE	6-6/255	Boston College
97	Lucas Reed	TE	6-6/255	New Mexico
19	Sean Renfree	QB	6-4/225	Duke
59	Matt Sewell	OL	6-8/345	McMaster (Canada)
85	Rodney Smith	WR	6-6/219	Florida State
72	Nick Speller	OL	6-5/290	Massachusetts
2	Zac Stacy	RB	5-9/214	Vanderbilt
54	Matt Stankiewitch	OL	6-3/303	Penn State
13	Nathan Stanley	QB	6-5/215	Southeastern Louisiana
8	Trent Steelman	WR	6-0/210	Army
86	Brandon Turner	WR	6-4/225	Navy
70	Earl Watford	OL	6-4/295	James Madison

==== Defense ====
No.	Name	Position	HT/WT	School
36	Sam Barrington	LB	6-2/238	South Florida
91	David Bass	DL	6-4/260	Missouri Western State
30	Brandan Bishop	S	6-2/205	North Carolina State
29	Xavier Brewer	CB	5-11/190	Clemson
77	Mike Catapano	DL	6-4/270	Princeton
93	Izaan Cross	DL	6-4/300	Georgia Tech
52	Matt Evans	LB	6-0/230	New Hampshire
24	Josh Evans	S	6-1/199	Florida
96	A. J. Francis	DL	6-5/315	Maryland
31	Rashard Hall	S	6-2/210	Clemson
42	Gerald Hodges	LB	6-2/251	Penn State
28	Josh Johnson	CB	5-11/195	Purdue
95	Cameron Meredith	DL	6-4/260	Nebraska
4	Robert McCabe	LB	6-2/234	Georgetown
90	Anthony McCloud	DL	6-2/322	Florida State
34	Lerentee McCray	LB	6-3/249	Florida
21	Brandon McGee	CB	6-0/197	Miami (FL)
46	Nick Moody	LB	6-2/237	Florida State
3	Sio Moore	LB	6-2/229	Connecticut
26	Kejuan Riley	S	6-1/208	Alabama State
7	Branden Smith	CB	5-11/175	Georgia
22	Rod Sweeting	CB	6-0/187	Georgia Tech
98	Devin Taylor	DL	6-8/267	South Carolina
1	Cooper Taylor	S	6-4/230	Richmond
94	Scott Vallone	DL	6-3/275	Rutgers
92	Joe Vellano	DL	6-2/295	Maryland
6	Kayvon Webster	CB	5-11/196	South Florida
23	Melvin White	CB	6-3/191	Louisiana Lafayette
9	Trey Wilson	CB	5-11/190	Vanderbilt
27	Earl Wolff	S	6-0/207	North Carolina State

==== Specialists ====
No.	Name	Position	HT/WT	School
17	Caleb Sturgis	K	5-11/190	Florida
14	Dylan Breeding	P	6-1/215	Arkansas

=== West Team ===
==== Offense ====
No.	Name	Position	Height/Weight	School
81	Anthony Amos	WR	6-0/185	Middle Tennessee State
60	Jeff Baca	OL	6-3/295	UCLA
74	Sam Brenner	OL	6-4/295	Utah
75	Braden Brown	OL	6-6/300	Brigham Young
4	Dan Buckner	WR	6-4/211	Arizona
1	Chad Bumphis	WR	5-11/198	Mississippi State
14	Alex Carder	QB	6-3/225	Western Michigan
8	Jasper Collins	WR	5-11/190	Mount Union
6	Keenan Davis	WR	6-2/215	Iowa
7	Seth Doege	QB	6-1/205	Texas Tech
50	Kirby Fabien	OL	6-6/305	Calgary
88	Joseph Fauria	TE	6-7/255	UCLA
53	James Ferentz	OL	6-1/288	Iowa
67	Manase Foketi	OL	6-5/235	West Texas A&M
66	Blaize Foltz	OL	6-4/315	Texas Christian
12	Tyrone Goard	WR	6-4/196	Eastern Kentucky
72	Tanner Hawkinson	OL	6-5 1/2/300	Kansas
44	Nick Kasa	TE	6-6/265	Colorado
48	Zach Line	RB	6-1/230	SMU
33	Christine Michael	RB	5-11/220	Texas A&M
68	Dann O'Neill	OL	6-8/305	Western Michigan
86	Theo Riddick	WR	5-11/200	Notre Dame
52	Andrew Robiskie	OL	6-2/302	Western Illinois
10	Matt Scott	QB	6-3/208	Arizona
84	Zach Sudfeld	TE	6-7/255	Nevada
56	Ryan Turnley	OL	6-6/313	Pittsburgh
25	Kerwynn Williams	RB	5-8 1/4/191	Utah State

==== Defense ====
No.	Name	Position	HT/WT	School
15	Jahleel Addae	S	5-11/200	Central Michigan
97	Josh Boyd	DL	6-3/300	Mississippi State
73	William Campbell	DL	6-5/310	Michigan
16	Cody Davis	S	6-2/205	Texas Tech
54	Steve Greer	LB	6-2/230	Virginia
31	Terry Hawthorne	CB	6-1/193	Illinois
3	Aaron Hester	CB	6-2/195	UCLA
28	DeVonte Holloman	LB	6-2/240	South Carolina
95	Wes Horton	DL	6-2/237	USC
9	Demontre Hurst	CB	5-10/183	Oklahoma
18	Micah Hyde	CB	6-1/190	Iowa
11	Keelan Johnson	S	6-1/207	Arizona State
43	Travis Johnson	DE	6-2/245	San Jose State
47	A. J. Klein	LB	6-2/244	Iowa State
94	Rob Lohr	DL	6-4/290	Vanderbilt
24	Nigel Malone	CB	5-10/180	Kansas State
20	Bradley McDougald	S	6-1/210	Kansas
26	Zeke Motta	S	6-3/215	Notre Dame
83	Will Pericak	DL	6-4/295	Colorado
13	Keith Pough	LB	6-3/238	Howard
22	Sheldon Price	CB	6-2/180	UCLA
89	Craig Roh	DL	6-5/281	Michigan
51	Albert Rosette	LB	6-2/240	Nevada
45	Caleb Schreibeis	DL	6-3/252	Montana State
29	Shamarko Thomas	S	5-10/208	Syracuse
96	Brandon Thurmond	DL	6-2/260	Arkansas-Pine Bluff
42	Nathan Williams	LB	6-3/249	Ohio State
5	Duke Williams	S	6-0/200	Nevada
2	Khalid Wooten	CB	5-11/200	Nevada

==== Specialists ====
No.	Name	Position	HT/WT	School
19	Zach Brown	K	6-4/210	Portland State
49	Josh Hubner	P	6-4/238	Arizona State

== Game summary ==
=== Scoring summary ===
Scoring summary

Quarter	Time	Drive			Team	Scoring information	Score	
Quarter	Time	Plays	Yards	TOP	Team	Scoring information	East	West
1	11:14	6	17	3:27	West	Anthony Amos 3-yard touchdown run, Zach Brown kick good	0	7
2	1:49	9	46	4:20	East	48-yard field goal by Caleb Sturgis	3	7
2	1:00	2	60	0:49	West	Chad Bumphis 57-yard touchdown reception from Matt Scott, Zach Brown kick good	3	14
2	0:45				West	Interception returned 31 yards for touchdown by Nigel Malone, Zach Brown kick good	3	21
3	1:05	3	21	1:05	East	Trent Steelman 7-yard touchdown run, Caleb Sturgis kick good	10	21
4	8:07	14	80	7:58	West	Christine Michael 6-yard touchdown run, Zach Brown kick good	10	28
4	1:24	9	60	2:28	East	37-yard field goal by Caleb Sturgis	13	28
"TOP" = time of possession. For other American football terms, see Glossary of American football.							13	28

=== Statistics ===
Statistics	East	West
First downs	11	18
Total offense, plays - yards	50-203	59-310
Rushes-yards (net)	26-108	36-104
Passing yards (net)	95	206
Passes, Comp-Att-Int	10-24-3	16-23-2
Time of Possession	23:56	36:04

== 2013 NFL draft ==
Of the players that participated in the 2013 East–West Shrine Game, 35 were drafted during the 2013 NFL draft. The highest player drafted that played in the game was Christine Michael who was selected by the Seattle Seahawks in the second round (62nd overall).
