= Allen Robinson =

American football player (born 1993)

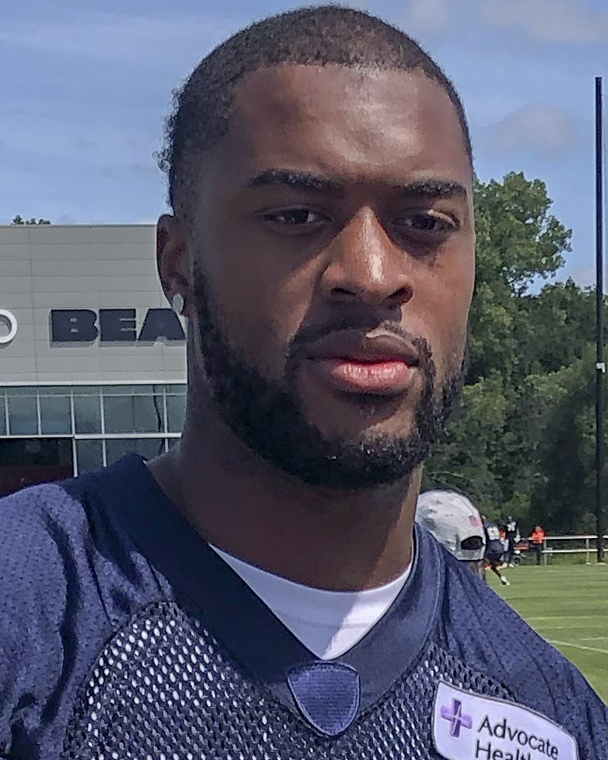
- Robinson with the Chicago Bears in 2021

No. 15, 12, 1, 11, 8
- Position: Wide receiver

Personal information
- Born: August 24, 1993 (age 33); Detroit, Michigan, U.S.
- Listed height: 6 ft 2 in (1.88 m)
- Listed weight: 221 lb (100 kg)

Career information
- High school: St. Mary's Preparatory (Orchard Lake Village, Michigan)
- College: Penn State (2011–2013)
- NFL draft: 2014: 2nd round, 61st overall pick

Career history
- Jacksonville Jaguars (2014–2017); Chicago Bears (2018–2021); Los Angeles Rams (2022); Pittsburgh Steelers (2023); New York Giants (2024)*; Detroit Lions (2024)
- * Offseason or practice squad member only

Awards and highlights
- Pro Bowl (2015); NFL receiving touchdowns co-leader (2015); First-team All-American (2013); 2× Big Ten Receiver of the Year (2012, 2013); 2× First-team All-Big Ten (2012, 2013)

Career NFL statistics
- Receptions: 565
- Receiving yards: 7,058
- Receiving touchdowns: 43
- Stats at Pro Football Reference

Allen Bernard Robinson II (born August 24, 1993) is an American former professional football wide receiver in the National Football League (NFL). He played college football for the Penn State Nittany Lions, earning first-team All-American honors in 2013. Robinson was selected by the Jacksonville Jaguars of the National Football League (NFL) in the second round of the 2014 NFL draft. He played for the Jaguars for four seasons, before signing with the Chicago Bears in 2018. Robinson has also played for the Los Angeles Rams, Pittsburgh Steelers, and Detroit Lions.

== Early life ==
Robinson was born in Detroit, Michigan. He attended St. Mary's Preparatory, where he played on the football team. In his senior season, he led the Eaglets to the Division 3 State Championship, where they lost 35–27 to East Grand Rapids High School. He was a teammate of former Penn State quarterback Rob Bolden. In addition to football, Robinson was a competitor for the St. Mary's Preparatory track and field team. Robinson committed to Penn State on November 29, 2010, after being recruited by Penn State assistant coach Ron Vanderlinden. He had also received offers from Minnesota, Buffalo, and Toledo.

College recruiting
Name	Hometown	School	Height	Weight	Commit date
Allen Robinson; WR	Detroit, Michigan	St. Mary's Preparatory	6 ft 3 in (1.91 m)	209 lb (95 kg)	Nov 29, 2010
Allen Robinson; WR	Recruit ratings: Scout: Rivals:				
Overall recruit ranking:
Note: In many cases, Scout, Rivals, 247Sports, On3, and ESPN may conflict in their listings of height and weight.; In these cases, the average was taken. ESPN grades are on a 100-point scale.; Sources: "2011 Team Ranking". Rivals.com.

== College career ==
=== 2011 season ===
Robinson appeared in 12 games and caught three passes for 29 yards during his freshman year in 2011 under head coach Joe Paterno. On September 10, 2011, he had one reception for 12 receiving yards, the first of his collegiate career, in a 27–11 loss to #3 Alabama. He made his first career start on the road against #15 Wisconsin in a vital game that would help determine the Big Ten Leaders Division champion.

=== 2012 season ===
After losing Justin Brown, who transferred to Oklahoma, Devon Smith, who transferred to Marshall, and Curtis Drake, who was dismissed after a violation of team rules, Robinson was quickly thrust into the spotlight as the team's number one returning wide receiver in 2012 under new head coach Bill O'Brien.

Robinson quickly struck an accord with new coach Bill O'Brien and quarterback Matt McGloin in the Nittany Lions' 8–4 season. He caught nine passes for 97 receiving yards in the team's first game of the year, a 24–14 loss to Ohio on September 1. In the following week, on September 8, he had 10 receptions for 89 receiving yards and one receiving touchdown, the first of his collegiate career, on a 30-yard reception in the 17–16 loss to Virginia. In the first game since Shawney Kersey was dismissed from the team, Robinson responded by catching five passes for 136 receiving yards and three receiving touchdowns in a 34–7 victory over Navy. After the game, Penn State assistant head coach and wide receivers coach Stan Hixon remarked, "Obviously he's made a big improvement from the spring, and from the spring we saw that he has potential to be a really good receiver. Each and every day, he's getting better and better at running routes, coming out of routes, and also, a much better job catching the ball in his hands. He has done a good job getting separation in certain routes, like we ask him to do, and he's been a really good student of the game." On September 22, he had five receptions for 82 receiving yards and a receiving touchdown in a 24–13 victory over Temple. On October 6, he had nine receptions for 85 receiving yards and two receiving touchdowns in a 39–28 victory over #24 Northwestern. On October 20, he had six receptions for 39 receiving yards and a receiving touchdown in a 38–14 victory over Iowa. Robinson set a single season record for most receptions in a season on November 17 as part of an effort in which he finished with 10 receptions, 197 receiving yards, and three receiving touchdowns in a 45–22 victory over Indiana. His 197 receiving yards were the most in a game by a Penn State receiver since Deon Butler had 216 in 2006. He surpassed Bobby Engram and O. J. McDuffie, who had each recorded 63 receptions in a season.

In his sophomore season, Robinson totaled 77 receptions for 1,018 receiving yards and 11 receiving touchdowns, which all led the Big Ten Conference in 2012. His 77 receptions were the most by a sophomore in school history. He won the Richter–Howard Receiver of the Year award for the 2012 season.

=== 2013 season ===
As a junior, Robinson served as a productive anchor for the Nittany Lion offense in their 7–5 season. In Penn State's season opener against Syracuse, Robinson recorded 11 receptions for 133 receiving yards and one receiving touchdown from freshman quarterback Christian Hackenberg in the 23–17 victory at MetLife Stadium. For the second consecutive game, Robinson caught seven passes and scored a receiving touchdown, this time in a 45–7 victory over Eastern Michigan. The next week, the Nittany Lions suffered their first setback of the season, while Robinson made nine receptions for 144 receiving yards and a receiving touchdown in the 34–31 loss to Central Florida.

In the fifth game of the regular season at Indiana, Robinson recorded a season-high 12 receptions for 173 receiving yards and two receiving touchdowns in the 44–24 loss. On October 26, 2013, Robinson tied his season-highs after catching 12 passes for 173 receiving yards and scored a receiving touchdown in a 63–14 loss to #4 Ohio State. On November 23, he had eight receptions for 106 receiving yards in a 23–20 loss to Nebraska. In his last career collegiate game, he finished with a total of eight receptions for 122 receiving yards in a 31–24 victory over #14 Wisconsin. He finished his junior season with a total of 97 receptions for 1,432 receiving yards and six touchdown receptions, while starting all 12 regular season games. His reception and receiving yard totals led the Big Ten Conference in 2013. Robinson finished his collegiate career with the second-most receptions, third-most receiving yards, and fifth-most receiving touchdowns in school history.

Robinson became was the first wide receiver to lead the Big Ten in receptions and yardage since 1985. He won the Richter–Howard Receiver of the Year award for the second consecutive season. Robinson was named an All-American by The Sporting News and Phil Steele named Robinson to his second-team All-America squad. On January 2, 2014, he announced that he would forgo his senior season and enter the 2014 NFL draft.

== Professional career ==
=== Pre-draft ===
Coming out of Penn State, Robinson was projected by the majority of analysts and scouts to be a first-to-third round draft selection. NFLDraftScout.com ranked him as the sixth best wide receiver and the 34th overall prospect, while Sports Illustrated ranked him seventh among wide receivers. He was invited to the 2014 NFL Combine and completed the majority of workouts, but elected not to perform the bench press. Robinson participated at Penn State's Pro Day and decided to perform all the drills except the bench and shuttle and was able to improve on all of his combine numbers.

Pre-draft measurables
Height	Weight	Arm length	Hand span	Wingspan	40-yard dash	10-yard split	20-yard split	20-yard shuttle	Three-cone drill	Vertical jump	Broad jump
6 ft 2 5/8 in (1.90 m)	220 lb (100 kg)	32 in (0.81 m)	9 1/2 in (0.24 m)	6 ft 4 in (1.93 m)	4.47 s	1.53 s	2.59 s	4.00 s	6.54 s	42.0 in (1.07 m)	10 ft 11 in (3.33 m)
All values from NFL Combine/Pro Day

=== Jacksonville Jaguars ===
==== 2014 ====
The Jacksonville Jaguars selected Robinson in the second round with the 61st overall pick in the 2014 NFL draft. He was the 11th wide receiver selected and the second receiver drafted by the Jaguars in 2014, behind Marqise Lee who was selected in the second round at 39th overall. In addition, Robinson was one of three Penn State Nittany Lions to be selected that year. On June 21, 2014, the Jaguars signed Robinson to a four-year, $3.51 million contract that included $1.17 million guaranteed and a signing bonus of $877,718.

Robinson opened the regular season as the fourth wide receiver behind Lee, Cecil Shorts, and fellow rookie Allen Hurns. In the Jaguars' season opener on September 7, he caught his first career pass from Chad Henne for no gain in a 34–17 loss to the Philadelphia Eagles. On September 14, he had four receptions for 75 receiving yards in the 41–10 loss to the Washington Redskins. On September 21, he earned his first career start and caught seven passes for 79 receiving yards in a 44–17 loss to the Indianapolis Colts in Week 3. On October 12, he caught a season-high eight passes for 68 receiving yards in a 14–16 loss to the Tennessee Titans. The following week, Robinson caught his first touchdown from fellow rookie Blake Bortles during a 24–6 victory over the Cleveland Browns to help the Jaguars end a nine-game losing streak. On October 26, he had five receptions for 82 receiving yards and a receiving touchdown in the 27–13 loss to the Miami Dolphins. On November 9, he had five receptions for 60 receiving yards in a 31–17 loss to the Dallas Cowboys. The game against the Cowboys was Robinson's last game in the 2014 season where he recorded any meaningful statistics due to a stress fracture in his right foot.

Robinson finished his rookie season with 48 receptions for 548 receiving yards and two touchdowns while starting eight games and playing in ten.

==== 2015 ====
The following season, Robinson was named one of the regular season starters, along with fellow second-year player Allen Hurns.

In the season opener, he caught one pass for 27 receiving yards in a 9–20 loss to the Carolina Panthers. The next game, Robinson caught six passes for a season-high 155 receiving yards and scored two receiving touchdowns during a 23–20 victory over the Dolphins On October 11, he had seven receptions for 72 receiving yards and two receiving touchdowns in the 38–31 loss to the Tampa Bay Buccaneers. In the next game on October 18, he had six receptions for 86 receiving yards and a receiving touchdown in the 31–20 loss to the Houston Texans. The next week, he had six receptions for 98 receiving yards and a receiving touchdown in a 34–31 victory over the Buffalo Bills. On November 8, he had six receptions for 121 receiving yards in the 28–23 victory over the New York Jets. On November 19, he had five receptions for 113 receiving yards in a 19–13 victory over the Titans. On December 20, Robinson caught a season-high 10 receptions for 153 receiving yards and a season-high three receiving touchdowns during a 39–42 loss to the Titans. On December 27, he had six receptions for 151 receiving yards and a receiving touchdown in the 38–27 loss to the New Orleans Saints. His receiving touchdown in the game was a 90-yard reception, which was the longest in the NFL for the 2015 season and the longest play from scrimmage in franchise history. In the regular season finale on January 3, 2016, he had five receptions for 108 receiving yards in a 30–6 loss to the Houston Texans as the Jaguars finished with a 5–11 record.

Robinson finished his second season with 80 receptions for 1,400 receiving yards and 14 touchdown receptions. He led the Jaguars in receptions, receiving yards, and receiving touchdowns during the 2015 season and was the first Jaguars' receiver since Jimmy Smith in 2005 to have over 1,000 receiving yards in a single season. Robinson recorded the second-most receiving yards in a season in franchise history at the time. He, along with Doug Baldwin and Brandon Marshall, tied for the league lead in receiving touchdowns with 14. He was the first player in franchise history to be a league leader in receiving touchdowns in a single season.

Robinson was named as a first alternate to the 2016 Pro Bowl and replaced Calvin Johnson, who was unable to participate due to injury. He was ranked 31st by his fellow players on the NFL Top 100 Players of 2016.

After Robinson and Hurns both had breakout seasons in 2015 with over 60 receptions, 1,000 receiving yards, and 10 touchdown receptions each, they were nicknamed "Thunder and Lightning" and "The Allen Brothers".

==== 2016 ====
In the Jaguars' season-opener against the Green Bay Packers, Robinson caught six passes for 72 receiving yards in a 23–27 loss. On September 25, he made seven receptions for 57 receiving yards, and caught his first two touchdowns of the season during a 17–19 loss to the Baltimore Ravens. During a Week 10 matchup against the AFC South rival Texans, Robinson had a nine receptions, 107 receiving yards, and a receiving touchdown during the 21–24 loss. The victory over the Texans was Robinson's first game of the season eclipsing 100 receiving yards. On Christmas Eve, he bounced back and caught nine passes for a season-high 147 receiving yards in a 38–17 victory over their division rival Titans.

Robinson finished the 2016 season with 73 receptions for 883 receiving yards and six receiving touchdowns.

==== 2017 ====
During Week 1 against the Texans, Robinson had one reception for 17 yards but had to leave the game early in the first quarter with an apparent knee injury. Hours later, it was confirmed that his left knee was diagnosed with a torn ACL, which prematurely ended his 2017 season. He was placed on injured reserve on September 12, 2017.

=== Chicago Bears ===
==== 2018 ====
On March 14, 2018, Robinson signed a three-year, $42 million contract with the Chicago Bears. He was part of a position group that contained Taylor Gabriel, Anthony Miller, and Josh Bellamy. He made his Bears debut in the season opener against the Packers on NBC Sunday Night Football, recording a team-high 61 yards. The next week, he brought in a season-high 10 receptions for 83 yards in a 24–17 victory over the Seattle Seahawks on Monday Night Football. On September 30, he scored his first receiving touchdown with the Bears on a 14-yard reception from Mitchell Trubisky in a 48–10 victory over the Buccaneers. The next week, he scored again against the Dolphins on a 12-yard catch as part of a 64-yard performance on five receptions in the 31–28 overtime loss. In Week 10, a 34–22 victory over the Detroit Lions, Robinson had six catches for 133 yards and two touchdowns.

Robinson finished the 2018 season with 55 catches for 754 receiving yards and four receiving touchdowns. He received an overall grade of 77.7 from Pro Football Focus in 2018, which ranked as the 28th highest grade among all qualifying wide receivers. In his postseason debut, a 16–15 defeat to the Eagles in the Wild Card Round, Robinson set two postseason franchise records: 10 receptions, which tied with Matt Forte, and 143 receiving yards.

==== 2019 ====
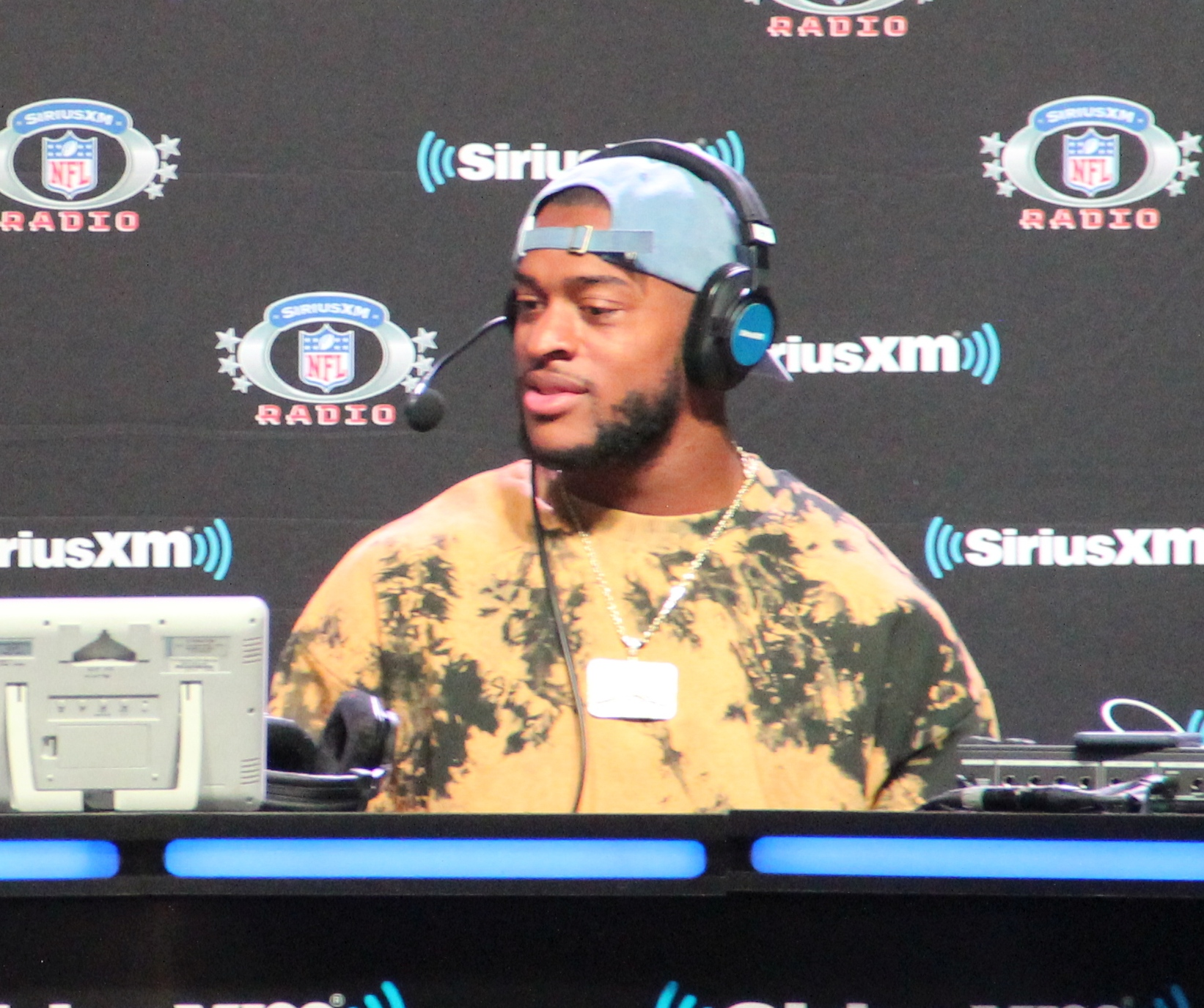
Robinson in 2019

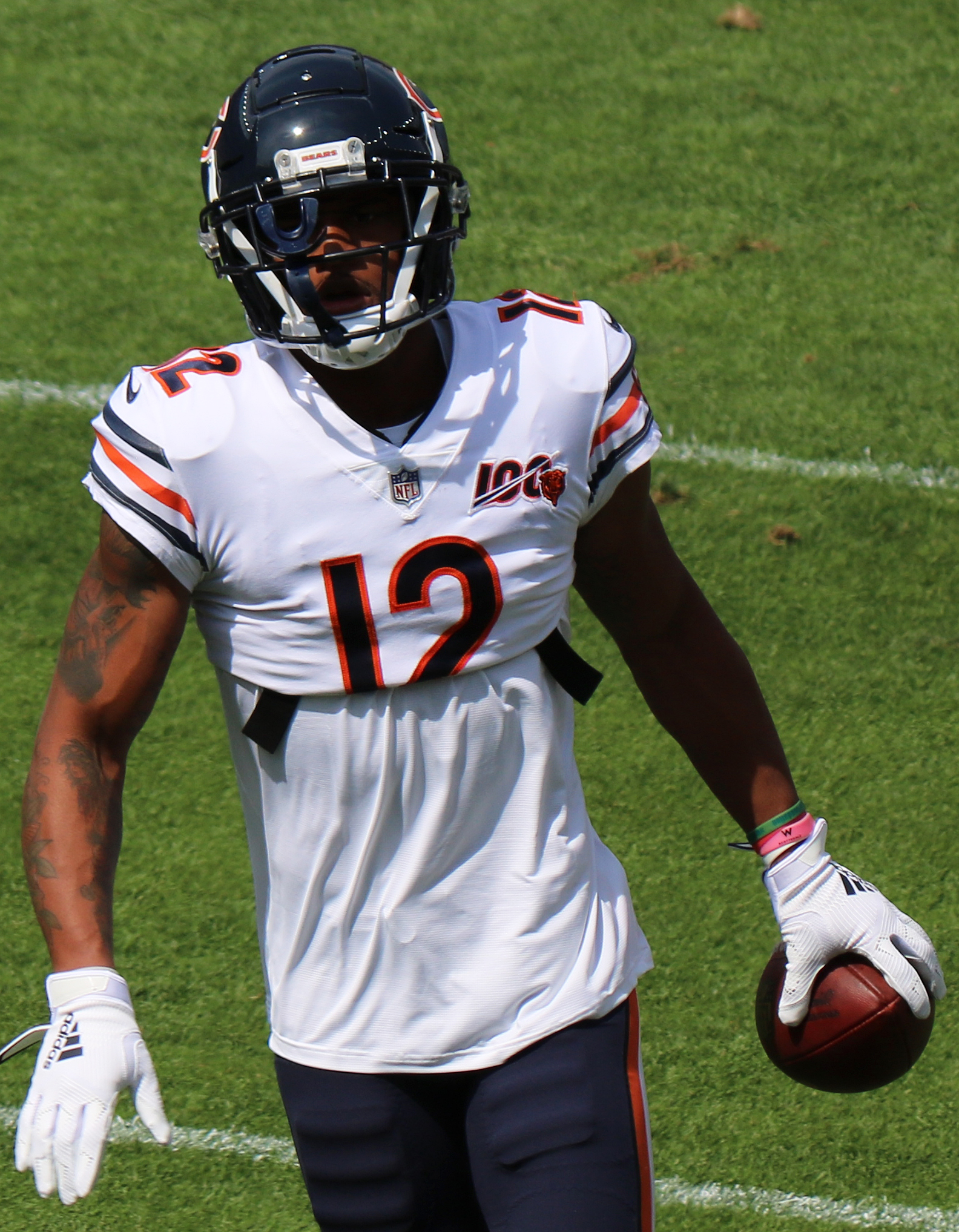
Robinson with the Chicago Bears in 2019

In Week 1 against the Packers, Robinson caught seven passes for 102 receiving yards as the Bears lost 10–3. In Week 2 against the Denver Broncos, Robinson caught four passes for 41 receiving yards as the Bears won 16–14. With seconds left on the game clock, Robinson caught a 25-yard pass from quarterback Mitchell Trubisky that set up a 53-yard game winning field goal by Eddy Piñeiro. In Week 5 against the Oakland Raiders, Robinson caught seven passes for 97 receiving yards and two receiving touchdowns in the 24–21 loss. In Week 12 against the New York Giants, Robinson caught six passes for 131 receiving yards and a receiving touchdown in the 19–14 win. In Week 13 against the Lions on Thanksgiving Day, Robinson caught eight passes for 86 receiving yards and a receiving touchdown in the 24–20 win. In the following week's game against the Cowboys on Thursday Night Football, Robinson caught five passes for 48 receiving yards and two receiving touchdowns in the 31–24 win. In Week 15 against the Packers, Robinson caught seven passes for 125 receiving yards in the 21–13 loss. During the game, Robinson reached 1,000 receiving yards on the season for the first time since 2015. He became the first Bears receiver to reach 1,000 receiving yards in a single season since Alshon Jeffery in 2014. Robinson finished the 2019 season with a career high in receptions with 98 for 1,147 receiving yards and seven receiving touchdowns.

==== 2020 ====
During Week 3 against the Atlanta Falcons, Robinson finished with 123 receiving yards and a touchdown as the Bears won 30–26. In the following week's game against the Colts, Robinson recorded seven catches for 101 yards and another touchdown during the 19–11 loss. In Week 12 against the Packers on Sunday Night Football, he had eight receptions for 74 receiving yards and two receiving touchdowns during the 41–25 loss.

In Week 13 against the Lions, Robinson caught a pass on third down-and-5 with 22 seconds left in the game and stepped out of bounds after four yards instead of going for the first down. The Bears were unable to convert on the ensuing fourth-and-1 attempt and turned the ball over on downs, losing the game by a score of 34–30. In Week 14 against the Texans, he had nine receptions for 123 receiving yards and a touchdown in the 36–7 victory; the performance enabled him to pass 1,000 receiving yards for the second straight season. The following week's game saw Robinson play against his former team in the Jaguars, during which he recorded 103 receiving yards and surpassed 100 season receptions for the first time in his career as the Bears won 41–17. Overall, Robinson finished the 2020 season with 102 receptions for 1,250 receiving yards and six receiving touchdowns. Robinson's 102 receptions tied him with Matt Forte for the second-most in franchise history for a single season.

==== 2021 ====
On March 9, 2021, the Bears placed the franchise tag on Robinson. He signed the one-year tender on March 24. His production fell precipitously in 2021, with Robinson finishing with 38 receptions for 410 receiving yards and one receiving touchdown in 12 games played.

=== Los Angeles Rams ===
On March 17, 2022, Robinson signed a three-year, $46.5 million contract with the Los Angeles Rams. Robinson started the first 10 games of the season, catching 33 passes for 339 yards and three touchdowns. On November 27, it was announced that Robinson would undergo season–ending surgery to repair a foot injury. He was placed on injured reserve on November 29.

=== Pittsburgh Steelers ===
On April 21, 2023, Robinson was traded to the Pittsburgh Steelers for a swap of 2023 seventh-round picks. He started in all 17 regular season games for the Steelers. He finished with 34 receptions for 280 receiving yards.

On March 8, 2024, Robinson was released by the Steelers.

=== New York Giants ===
On May 9, 2024, Robinson signed with the New York Giants. On August 27, the Giants released Robinson.

=== Detroit Lions ===
On August 28, 2024, Robinson was signed to the Detroit Lions' practice squad. He was promoted to the active roster on September 26. In the 2024 season, Robinson appeared in 12 games and finished with three receptions for 30 yards.

After not playing in 2025, Robinson announced his retirement from professional football on August 24, 2026.

== Career statistics ==
=== NFL ===
Legend
	Led the league
**Bold**	Career high

==== Regular season ====
Year	Team	Games		Receiving					Rushing					Fumbles	
Year	Team	GP	GS	Rec	Yds	Avg	Lng	TD	Att	Yds	Avg	Lng	TD	Fum	Lost
2014	JAX	10	8	48	548	11.4	54	2	—	—	—	—	—	0	0
2015	JAX	16	16	80	**1,400**	**17.5**	**90T**	**14**	—	—	—	—	—	0	0
2016	JAX	16	16	73	883	12.1	42	6	—	—	—	—	—	**1**	0
2017	JAX	1	1	1	17	17.0	17	0	—	—	—	—	—	0	0
2018	CHI	13	12	55	754	13.7	43	4	**1**	**9**	**9.0**	**9**	0	**1**	**1**
2019	CHI	16	15	98	1,147	11.7	49	7	**1**	2	2.0	2	0	0	0
2020	CHI	16	16	**102**	1,250	12.3	42	6	**1**	−1	−1.0	−1	0	0	0
2021	CHI	12	11	38	410	10.8	39	1	—	—	—	—	—	0	0
2022	LAR	10	10	33	339	10.3	29	3	—	—	—	—	—	0	0
2023	PIT	17	17	34	280	8.2	31	0	—	—	—	—	—	0	0
2024	DET	12	0	3	30	10.0	21	0	—	—	—	—	—	0	0
Total		139	122	565	7,058	12.5	90	43	3	10	3.3	9	0	2	1

==== Postseason ====
Year	Team	Games		Receiving					Rushing					Fumbles	
Year	Team	GP	GS	Rec	Yds	Avg	Lng	TD	Att	Yds	Avg	Lng	TD	Fum	Lost
2017	JAX	0	0	Did not play due to injury											
2018	CHI	1	1	**10**	**143**	**14.3**	**45**	**1**	—	—	—	—	—	0	0
2020	CHI	1	1	6	55	9.2	21	0	—	—	—	—	—	0	0
2023	PIT	1	1	2	12	6.0	13	0	—	—	—	—	—	0	0
2024	DET	0	0	Did not play											
Total		3	3	18	210	11.7	45	1	0	0	0.0	0	0	0	0

=== College ===
Season	Team	Games		Receiving			
Season	Team	GP	GS	Rec	Yds	Avg	TD
2011	Penn State	11	0	3	29	9.7	0
2012	Penn State	**12**	**12**	77	1,018	13.2	**11**
2013	Penn State	**12**	**12**	**97**	**1,432**	**14.8**	6
Career		35	24	177	2,479	14.0	17

== Career highlights ==
=== Awards and honors ===
NFL

- Pro Bowl (2015)
- NFL receiving touchdowns co-leader (2015)
- Brian Piccolo Award (2020)
- 3× NFL Top 100 — 31st (2016), 93rd (2020), 87th (2021)

College

- First-team All-American (2013)
- 2× Big Ten Receiver of the Year (2012, 2013)
- 2× First-team All-Big Ten (2012, 2013)

=== Records ===
==== Jaguars franchise records ====
- Longest play from scrimmage, (90 yards, against the Saints on December 27, 2015) (tied with Leonard Fournette)
- Most receiving touchdowns in a season: (14, in 2015)
- Most receiving touchdowns in a single game: (3, against the Titans on December 6, 2015) (tied with Marcedes Lewis and Jimmy Smith)
- Most games with at least 150 receiving yards, single season: (3, in 2015)
- Most games with multiple touchdown receptions, single season: (3, in 2015) (tied with Marcedes Lewis)

==== Bears franchise records ====
- Most receptions in a playoff game, 10 (tied with Matt Forte), January 6, 2019, against the Eagles in the Wild Card Round
- Most receiving yards in a playoff game, 143, January 6, 2019, against the Eagles in the Wild Card Round

== Personal life ==
Robinson was raised by Tracie and Allen Robinson Sr. and has a sister, Ashley. He was a telecommunications major at Penn State. He has an interest in sportscasting and coaching. While in Jacksonville, Robinson started the Within Reach Foundation, which supports education programs for children.

Robinson appeared in a Season 6 episode of the television series Ink Master.
