= Charles London =

American football player and coach (born 1975)

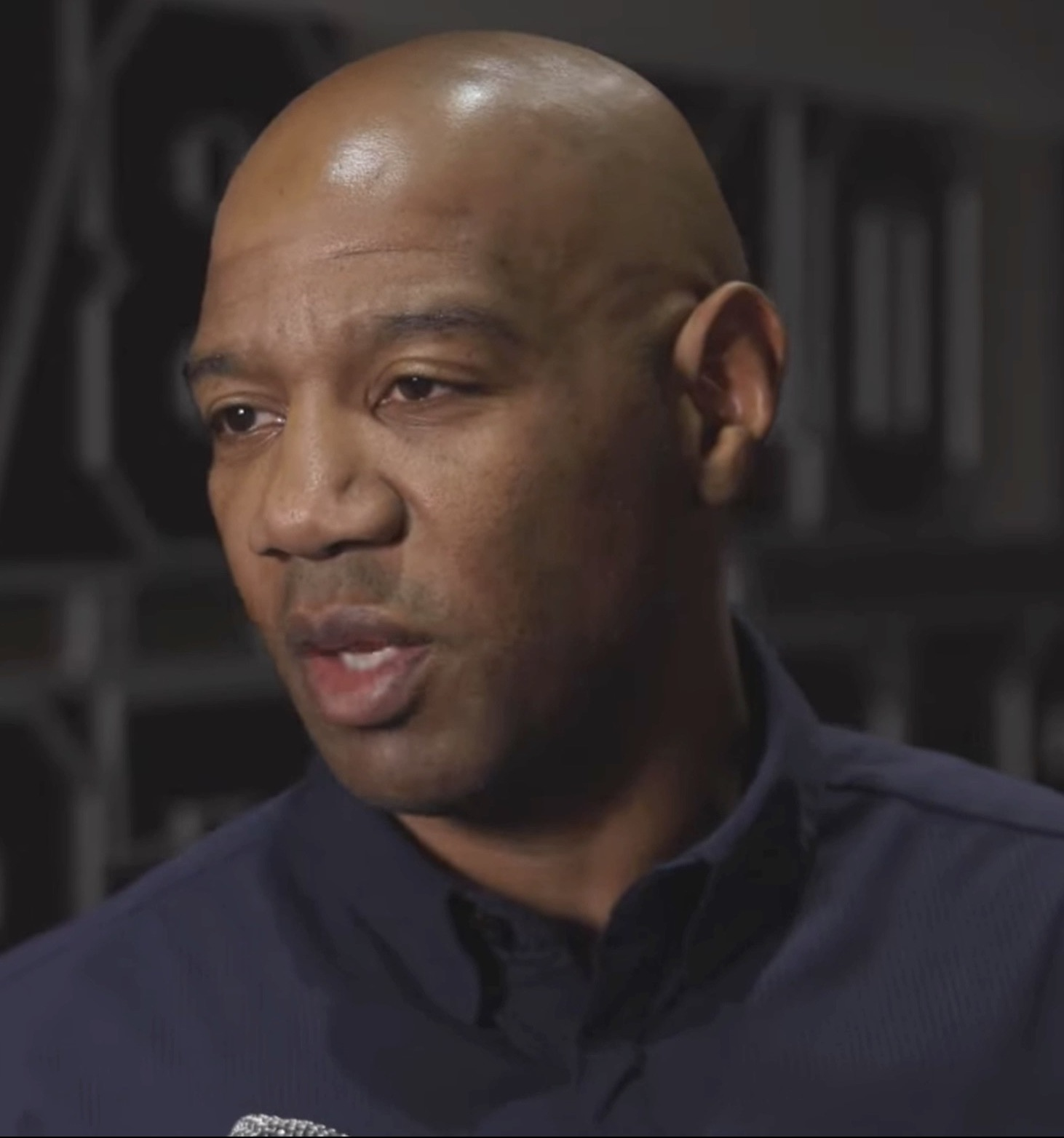
- London in 2022

New England Patriots
- Title: Offensive analyst

Personal information
- Born: August 12, 1975 (age 51); Dunwoody, Georgia, U.S.

Career information
- Position: Running back
- College: Duke

Career history

Coaching
- Duke (2004–2005) Graduate assistant; Duke (2006) Running backs coach; Chicago Bears (2007–2009) Offensive quality control coach; Tennessee Titans (2011) Offensive assistant; Penn State (2012–2013) Running backs coach; Houston Texans (2014–2017) Running backs coach; Chicago Bears (2018–2020) Running backs coach; Atlanta Falcons (2021–2022) Quarterbacks coach; Tennessee Titans (2023) Quarterbacks coach & pass game coordinator; Seattle Seahawks (2024) Quarterbacks coach; New York Jets (2025) Quarterbacks coach; New England Patriots (2026–present) Offensive analyst

Operations
- Philadelphia Eagles (2010) Scout

Charles London (born August 12, 1975) is an American football coach and former running back who serves on the coaching staff of the New England Patriots of the National Football League (NFL).

== Early life ==
London attended Dunwoody High School in Dunwoody, Georgia, before enrolling at Duke University, where he played running back for the Duke Blue Devils football team.

== Coaching career ==
=== Duke ===
London returned to Duke as a graduate assistant in 2004. He spent two years as a graduate assistant before becoming the full-time running backs coach in 2006. The Blue Devils lost all 12 games in 2006, recording the fourth winless season in program history.

=== First stint in the NFL ===
The Chicago Bears hired London on March 1, 2007 as an offensive assistant/quality control coach. London was fired alongside his offensive coordinator Ron Turner on January 6, 2010.

He joined the Philadelphia Eagles as a pro scout in 2010 and then joined the Tennessee Titans in 2011 as an offensive assistant and quality control coach.

=== Penn State ===
London returned to college-level coaching as Penn State University’s running backs coach under head coach Bill O’Brien, who he had worked with prior in 2005–06 in Duke. The Nittany Lions went 8–4 in 2012, defeating No. 24 Northwestern but falling to No. 9 Ohio State & No. 18 Nebraska. Despite the winning record, they were not eligible for a bowl game. Under his coaching, running back Zach Zwinak eclipsed 1,000 yards from scrimmage and scored 7 touchdowns.

The Nittany Lions went 7–5 and won the Lambert-Meadowlands Trophy. They would defeat No. 18 Michigan & No. 14 Wisconsin but lose to No. 4 Ohio State. Zwinak recorded 989 yards and scored 12 touchdowns.

=== Houston Texans ===
London left Penn State to join O’Brien's coaching staff when he became the head coach of the Houston Texans during the 2014 NFL season. The Texans went 9–7 and missed the playoffs. Under his coaching, running back Arian Foster recorded over 1,500 yards from scrimmage & scored 13 touchdowns and was named to the Pro Bowl.

The Texans went 9–7 and won the AFC South division title in 2015, the team's first playoff berth since 2012, but were shut out by the Kansas City Chiefs 30–0 in the wild-card round. During the season they defeated the would-be AFC North champion Cincinnati Bengals 10–6 in a Week 10 matchup.

The Texans went 9–7 and repeated as AFC South champions in 2016, defeating the Oakland Raiders in the wild-card round but then falling to the New England Patriots in their first divisional round matchup since 2012. Lamar Miller recorded over 1,200 yards from scrimmage and scored 6 touchdowns. In 2017, Miller recorded 1,200 yards from scrimmage and 6 touchdowns. London resigned from his position on January 2, 2018, wanting to seek a quarterback coaching position.

=== Chicago Bears ===
London rejoined the Chicago Bears as running backs coach on January 10, 2018. Under his coaching, Jordan Howard eclipsed 1,000 yards from scrimmage and scored 9 touchdowns.

The Bears' offense produced the fifth fewest rushing yards in the NFL in 2019.

=== Atlanta Falcons ===
London was hired by the Atlanta Falcons as their quarterbacks coach on January 22, 2021.

=== Tennessee Titans ===
On February 9, 2023, London was hired by the Tennessee Titans as their pass game coordinator and quarterbacks coach.

=== Seattle Seahawks ===
In February 2024, he was hired as the Seahawks quarterbacks coach.

=== New York Jets ===
On February 2, 2025, the New York Jets hired London as their quarterbacks coach. The Jets parted ways with London on January 23, 2026.
