= John Butler (American football coach) =

American football coach (born 1973)

Profile
- Position: Defensive coordinator

Personal information
- Born: April 3, 1973 (age 53); Philadelphia, Pennsylvania, U.S.

Career information
- High school: La Salle College (Wyndmoor, Pennsylvania)
- College: Catholic

Career history
- Catholic (1995) Defensive backs coach; Catholic (1996) Defensive coordinator; Texas (1997–1998) Graduate assistant; Midwestern State (1999–2000) Defensive coordinator/linebackers coach/safeties coach; Southwest Texas State (2001–2002) Special teams coach/safeties coach; Harvard (2003–2006) Special teams coach/linebackers coach; Minnesota (2007–2010) Special teams coach/linebackers coach; South Carolina (2011) Special teams coach/linebackers coach; Penn State (2012) Defensive backs coach; Penn State (2013) Defensive coordinator/defensive backs coach; Houston Texans (2014–2017) Secondary coach; Buffalo Bills (2018–2021) Defensive backs coach; Buffalo Bills (2022–2023) Defensive backs coach/passing game coordinator; Nebraska (2024) Secondary/Defensive pass game coordinator; Nebraska (2025) Defensive coordinator/Secondary

John Butler (born April 3, 1973) is an American football coach who is the former defensive coordinator at Nebraska. He previously served as the defensive backs coach for the Buffalo Bills of the National Football League and has coached collegiately at several schools, including Penn State, South Carolina, and Minnesota.

== Coaching career ==
=== College ===
Butler began his coaching career as an assistant at his alma mater, Catholic University, as a defensive backs coach before being promoted to defensive coordinator in 1996. He then progressed to Texas, where he served as a graduate assistant under both John Mackovic and Mack Brown in 1997 and 1998 respectively. After spending the next four years in the lower levels of college football, he returned to the Football Bowl Subdivision (FBS) in 2003 with Harvard, where he worked as the linebackers coach and special teams coach. His first connection to Ted Roof came from 2007 to 2010 while working for the Minnesota Golden Gophers as the linebackers coach under Roof. The Houston Texans hired Butler as a defensive assistant in the off-season, but then was hired by South Carolina where he served for one year. Butler re-united with Roof on Bill O'Brien's staff at Penn State. After Roof moved back to his alma mater at Georgia Tech, Butler was promoted to defensive coordinator over two more experienced assistants, linebackers coach Ron Vanderlinden and defensive line coach Larry Johnson.

=== Professional ===
In early 2014, Butler left Penn State to join O'Brien's Houston Texans staff as secondary coach. On January 2, 2018 he was fired by the Houston Texans. On January 30, 2018 Butler was hired by the Buffalo Bills coaching staff under head coach and former high school teammate Sean McDermott. On February 24, 2022, he gained the additional title of passing game coordinator. On February 7, 2024, Butler and the Bills mutually agreed to part ways.
