= 2012 All-Big Ten Conference football team =

American college football all-star team

The 2012 All-Big Ten Conference football team consists of American football players chosen as All-Big Ten Conference players for the 2012 Big Ten Conference football season. The conference recognizes two official All-Big Ten selectors: (1) the Big Ten conference coaches selected separate offensive and defensive units and named first- and second-team players (the "Coaches" team); and (2) a panel of sports writers and broadcasters covering the Big Ten also selected offensive and defensive units and named first- and second-team players (the "Media" team).

== Offensive selections ==
=== Quarterbacks ===
- Taylor Martinez, Nebraska (Coaches-1; Media-2)
- Braxton Miller, Ohio State (Coaches-2; Media-1)

=== Running backs ===
- Montee Ball, Wisconsin (Coaches-1; Media-1)
- Le'Veon Bell, Michigan State (Coaches-1; Media-1)
- Ameer Abdullah, Nebraska (Coaches-2)
- Venric Mark, Northwestern (Coaches-2)
- Carlos Hyde, Ohio State (Coaches-2)

=== Receivers ===
- Allen Robinson, Penn State (Coaches-1; Media-1)
- Jared Abbrederis, Wisconsin (Coaches-1; Media-1)
- Kenny Bell, Nebraska (Coaches-2; Media-2)
- Corey Brown, Ohio State (Coaches-2)
- Cody Latimer, Indiana (Media-2)

=== Centers ===
- Matt Stankiewitch, Penn State (Coaches-1; Media-2)
- Travis Frederick, Wisconsin (Media-1)
- James Ferentz, Iowa (Coaches-2)

=== Guards ===
- Spencer Long, Nebraska (Coaches-1; Media-1)
- John Urschel, Penn State (Coaches-1; Media-2)
- Patrick Omameh, Michigan (Coaches-1)
- Andrew Norwell, Ohio State (Media-1)
- Ryan Groy, Wisconsin (Coaches-2)
- Brian Mulroe, Northwestern (Media-2)

=== Tackles ===
- Taylor Lewan, Michigan (Coaches-1; Media-1)
- Rick Wagner, Wisconsin (Coaches-1; Media-1)
- Jeremiah Sirles, Nebraska (Coaches-2; Media-2)
- Hugh Thornton, Illinois (Coaches-2)
- Jack Mewhort, Ohio State (Media-2)

=== Tight ends ===
- Jacob Pedersen, Wisconsin (Coaches-1)
- Kyle Carter, Penn State (Media-1)
- Dion Sims, Michigan State (Coaches-2; Media-2)

== Defensive selections ==
=== Defensive linemen ===
- John Simon, Ohio State (Coaches-1; Media-1)
- Jordan Hill, Penn State (Coaches-1; Media-1)
- Kawann Short, Purdue (Coaches-1; Media-1)
- Johnathan Hankins, Ohio State (Coaches-1; Media-2)
- Eric Martin, Nebraska (Coaches-2; Media-1)
- Adam Replogle, Indiana (Coaches-2; Media-2)
- Michael Buchanan, Illinois (Coaches-2)
- Craig Roh, Michigan (Coaches-2)
- Baker Steinkuhler, Nebraska (Coaches-2)
- William Gholston, Michigan State (Media-2)
- D.L. Wilhite, Minnesota (Media-2)

=== Linebackers ===
- Michael Mauti, Penn State (Coaches-1; Media-1)
- Max Bullough, Michigan State (Coaches-1; Media-2)
- Ryan Shazier, Ohio State (Coaches-2; Media-1)
- Chris Borland, Wisconsin (Coaches-1)
- Mike Taylor, Wisconsin (Media-1)
- Gerald Hodges, Penn State (Coaches-2; Media-2)
- Will Compton, Nebraska (Coaches-2)
- Jake Ryan, Michigan (Media-2)

=== Defensive backs ===
- Micah Hyde, Iowa (Coaches-1; Media-1)
- Bradley Roby, Ohio State (Coaches-1; Media-1)
- Johnny Adams, Michigan State (Coaches-1; Media-2)
- Darqueze Dennard, Michigan State (Coaches-1; Media-2)
- Daimion Stafford, Nebraska (Coaches-2; Media-1)
- Travis Howard, Ohio State (Media-1)
- Jordan Kovacs, Michigan (Coaches-2)
- Christian Bryant, Ohio State (Coaches-2)
- Ricardo Allen, Purdue (Coaches-2)
- Josh Johnson, Purdue (Media-2)
- Devin Smith, Wisconsin (Media-2)

== Special teams ==
=== Kickers ===
- Jeff Budzien, Northwestern (Coaches-1; Media-2)
- Brett Maher, Nebraska (Coaches-2; Media-1)

=== Punter ===
- Mike Sadler, Michigan State (Coaches-1; Media-2)
- Brett Maher, Nebraska (Coaches-2)
- Will Hagerup, Michigan (Media-1)

== Key ==
Bold = Consensus first-team selection by both the coaches and media

Coaches = Selected by the Big Ten Conference coaches

Media = Selected by the conference media

== See also ==
- 2012 College Football All-America Team
