= Kyle Carter =

American football player (born 1992)

No. 48, 86
- Position: Tight end

Personal information
- Born: December 17, 1992 (age 33); New Castle, Delaware, U.S.
- Listed height: 6 ft 3 in (1.91 m)
- Listed weight: 243 lb (110 kg)

Career information
- High school: William Penn (New Castle)
- College: Penn State
- NFL draft: 2016: undrafted

Career history
- Minnesota Vikings (2016–2017); New York Giants (2018)*; Seattle Seahawks (2018)*; Buffalo Bills (2018–2019)*
- * Offseason or practice squad member only

Awards and highlights
- First-team All-Big Ten (2012); Freshman All-American (CBS, CFN, Scout.com, TSN)
- Stats at Pro Football Reference

Kyle T. Carter (born December 17, 1992) is an American former professional football player who was a tight end in the National Football League (NFL). He played college football for the Penn State Nittany Lions.

== Early life ==
Carter was born in New Castle, Delaware to Mitchell and Charlene Carter. He attended William Penn High School where he played for Bill Cole.

== Recruiting ==
College recruiting
Name	Hometown	School	Height	Weight	40^{‡}	Commit date
Kyle Carter; TE	New Castle, Delaware	William Penn High School	6 ft 4 in (1.93 m)	231 lb (105 kg)	4.94	May 27, 2010
Kyle Carter; TE	Recruit ratings: Scout: Rivals:					
Overall recruit ranking: Rivals: 234
‡ Refers to 40-yard dash; Note: In many cases, Scout, Rivals, 247Sports, On3, and ESPN may conflict in their listings of height, weight and 40 time.; In these cases, the average was taken. ESPN grades are on a 100-point scale.; Sources: "2011 Team Ranking". Rivals.com.

== College career ==
=== 2011 ===
Carter redshirted his freshman season.

=== 2012 ===
Coming into spring practice, Carter was listed fourth on the depth chart. But under new coach Bill O'Brien, Carter began to thrive. Carter has been a key part of the Penn State offense during the season. During week one against Ohio, Carter caught six passes for 74 yards. He caught his first career touchdown pass in week two against Virginia. Carter sat out the game on November 3 against Purdue due to an ankle injury.

== Professional career ==
=== Minnesota Vikings ===
Carter signed with the Vikings after going undrafted in the 2016 NFL draft. On September 3, 2016, he was released by the Vikings as part of final roster cuts. The next day, he was signed to the Vikings' practice squad. He was released by the Vikings on October 25, 2016. He was re-signed to the practice squad on December 13, 2016. He signed a reserve/futures contract with the Vikings on January 2, 2017.

On September 2, 2017, Carter was waived by the Vikings and was signed to the practice squad the next day. He was promoted to the active roster on December 15, 2017. He was waived by the Vikings on January 13, 2018.

=== New York Giants ===
On January 23, 2018, Carter was claimed off waivers by the New York Giants. He was waived on July 25, 2018.

=== Seattle Seahawks ===
On July 27, 2018, Carter was claimed off waivers by the Seattle Seahawks. He was waived on September 1, 2018.

=== Buffalo Bills ===
On December 12, 2018, Carter was signed to the Buffalo Bills practice squad. On July 29, 2019, he was re-signed by the Bills. He was waived on August 31, 2019.
