= Michael Mauti =

American football player (born 1990)

No. 56
- Position: Linebacker

Personal information
- Born: January 19, 1990 (age 36); New Orleans, Louisiana, U.S.
- Listed height: 6 ft 2 in (1.88 m)
- Listed weight: 243 lb (110 kg)

Career information
- High school: Mandeville (LA)
- College: Penn State
- NFL draft: 2013: 7th round, 213th overall pick

Career history
- Minnesota Vikings (2013–2014); New Orleans Saints (2015–2017)

Awards and highlights
- First-team All-American (2012); Big Ten Linebacker of the Year (2012); First-team All-Big Ten (2012)

Career NFL statistics
- Total tackles: 72
- Sacks: 1.0
- Forced fumbles: 2
- Defensive touchdowns: 1
- Stats at Pro Football Reference

Michael D. Mauti (born January 19, 1990) is an American former professional football player who was a linebacker in the National Football League (NFL). He played college football for the Penn State Nittany Lions, and was selected by the Minnesota Vikings in the seventh round of the 2013 NFL draft. He also played for the New Orleans Saints.

== Early life ==
Mauti was born in New Orleans, Louisiana. He played high school football at Mandeville High School for Coach Guy LeCompte in Mandeville, Louisiana. He amassed 121 tackles, four quarterback sacks, two forced fumbles, and two interceptions returned for touchdowns his senior season. He was ranked as the No. 3 inside linebacker prospect in the nation and was among ESPN.com's Top 150 recruits, and was also a top 20 linebacker by Rivals.com. Mauti was invited to play in the 2008 U.S. Army All-American Bowl.

In track & field, Mauti competed as a sprinter. At the 2007 Allstate Sugar Bowl T& Classic, he ran the 200 meters in 23.24 seconds and ran the fourth leg on the 4 × 100m squad, ending with a time of 45.96 seconds. He recorded a personal-best time of 6.93 seconds in the 55 meters at the LSU High School Qualifier and helped lead his 4 × 200m team to a twelfth-place finish with a time of 1:36.13 minutes.

== College career ==
Mauti graduated from high school early and enrolled at Pennsylvania State University in January 2008, where he would play for the Penn State Nittany Lions football team from 2008 to 2012. His extra time with the team paid dividends, with Mauti contributing on defense and special teams right away. He was one of three true freshmen on the team to play in every game, and finished the 2008 season with 26 tackles and a forced fumble. He would make an appearance in the Nittany Lions' 2009 Rose Bowl loss, and received the team's Jim O'Hora Award, presented to the defense's most improved player during spring practice. Mauti tore the anterior cruciate ligament in his right knee during summer practice, forcing him to take a medical redshirt for the 2009 season.

Mauti was highly productive in 2010, despite battling through nagging injuries. He finished the season with 67 tackles, two sacks, and a pass breakup. He was named Big Ten Conference Co-Defensive Player-of-the-Week on November 6, recording 11 tackles against Northwestern. Mauti left the game versus Ohio State in the second quarter with a shoulder injury, and was limited for the rest of the season until playing 59 snaps versus Florida in the 2011 Outback Bowl.

Heading into the 2011 season, Mauti was poised for a breakout year. He was named to Athlon Sports' pre-season All-American team and Phil Steele's pre-season All-Big Ten teams, as well as the Bronko Nagurski Trophy and Butkus Award watch lists. But Mauti again tore an anterior cruciate ligament—this time in his left knee—in Penn State's fourth game of the season against Eastern Michigan and was lost for the rest of the year.

Mauti came back for the 2012 season and during the first four games, Mauti recorded a total of forty tackles. During Week 5 against Illinois, Mauti recorded two interceptions including one which he returned 99 yards, but was stopped at the one yard line with one second to play in the half.

Despite missing the last game of the season, due to a third torn ACL, Mauti was named first-team All-Big Ten, first-team All-American, and won the Butkus-Fitzgerald Award for best Big Ten linebacker.

== Professional career ==
Pre-draft measurables
| Height | Weight | Arm length | Hand span | Bench press |
|---|---|---|---|---|
| 6 ft 2 in (1.88 m) | 243 lb (110 kg) | 31 1/2 in (0.80 m) | 10 1/2 in (0.27 m) | 28 reps |
All values from NFL Combine

=== Minnesota Vikings ===
Mauti was selected by the Minnesota Vikings in the seventh round, 213th overall of the 2013 NFL draft. The Vikings also selected fellow Penn State linebacker Gerald Hodges in the fourth round, reuniting the teammates in the NFL. He played for the Vikings for two years, primarily on special teams, before being cut at the end of training camp in 2015.

=== New Orleans Saints ===
The Saints claimed Mauti off waivers after Minnesota released him. On October 15, 2015, in a Thursday Night Football game against the Atlanta Falcons, Mauti blocked a Matt Bosher punt and returned it for a touchdown. The block was widely compared to a famous punt block made by Saints safety Steve Gleason in a 2006 game against Atlanta, in the Saints' first home game after a year in exile in the wake of Hurricane Katrina. This was especially so because Gleason was present and received an award at the 2015 game, while Mauti himself had attended the 2006 game in person.

Mauti had been dealing with the effects of ulcerative colitis and required surgery that would require him to miss the rest of the 2016 season. He was placed on the non-football injury list on November 15, 2016.

On July 24, 2017, Mauti re-signed with the Saints on a one-year deal. He was released by New Orleans on September 2. Mauti was re-signed by the team on October 17.

On April 5, 2018, Mauti re-signed with the Saints on a one-year contract. He was released by the Saints on May 16.

== Personal life ==
Mauti is the son of Rich Mauti, who played wide receiver at Penn State in 1975 and 1976, and in the National Football League for the New Orleans Saints (1977–1983) and Washington Redskins (1984). His brother Patrick was a wide receiver for the Nittany Lions from 2005 to 2009.

Mauti earned his degree in crime, law and justice from Penn State in December 2011.
