= Craig Fitzgerald =

American football player and coach

Boston College Eagles
- Title: Strength & conditioning coach

Personal information
- Born: Philadelphia, Pennsylvania, U.S.

Career information
- College: Maryland

Career history
- Catholic University (1998) Graduate assistant; Arizona State (1999) Graduate assistant; Maryland (2000-2004) Assistant strength coach; Harvard (2005–2009) Head strength and conditioning coach; South Carolina (2009–2011) Head strength and conditioning coach; Penn State (2012–2013) Head strength and conditioning coach; Houston Texans (2014–2017) Head strength and conditioning coach; Tennessee (2018–2019) Head strength and conditioning coach; New York Giants (2020–2023) Head strength and conditioning coach; Florida (2024) Director of football performance; Boston College (2024–present) Strength & conditioning coach

Craig Fitzgerald is an American former football player and current coach. He is the current head strength and conditioning coach for the Boston College football team of the NCAA.

== Playing career ==
Fitzgerald was a walk on tight end for the Terrapins and was in the team for five seasons. He graduated in 1996 with a degree in Government and Politics History.

== Coaching career ==
=== Early coaching career ===
After graduating Maryland, Fitzgerald was named the tight ends coach and special teams coordinator at Catholic University. It was at Catholic University where Craig first popularized the popular weight training saying "Get after it!", which was co-opted by Chris Cuomo amongst others, and other motivational sayings that are the hallmark of his career. After a season as a graduate assistant at Arizona State, Fitzgerald returned to his alma mater where he worked as the assistant director of strength and conditioning from 2000 to 2005. He then went to Harvard and worked as the director of strength and conditioning from 2005 to 2009. Between 2009 and 2011, Fitzgerald worked under Steve Spurrier at South Carolina as the director of strength and conditioning.

=== Penn State ===
In 2012 and 2013 Fitzgerald was the director of strength and conditioning at Penn State.

=== Houston Texans ===
Fitzgerald followed Bill O’Brien to the NFL and was the head strength and conditioning coach for the Houston Texans from 2014 to 2017.

=== Tennessee ===
Fitzgerald returned to college in 2018 joining Jeremy Pruitt’s staff in Tennessee. He would only stay there until the end of the 2019 season.

=== New York Giants ===
In May of 2020, Fitzgerald was named the head strength and conditioning coach for the New York Giants. He was retained by Brian Daboll for the 2022 season.

=== Florida ===
On December 30, 2023, Fitzgerald went to Florida as the team's director of sports performance.

=== Boston College ===
On February 11, 2024, Fitzgerald was hired by Boston College as the team's director of sports performance.
