= Ron Vanderlinden =

American football coach

Biographical details
- Born: Livonia, Michigan, U.S.

Playing career
- 1974–1977: Albion
- Position: Center

Coaching career (HC unless noted)
- 1978: Bowling Green (GA)
- 1979–1980: Michigan (GA)
- 1981–1982: Ball State (OL)
- 1983–1991: Colorado (DL)
- 1992–1996: Northwestern (DC/LB)
- 1997–2000: Maryland
- 2001–2011: Penn State (LB)
- 2011: Penn State (co-DC/LB)
- 2012–2013: Penn State (LB)
- 2014–2020: Air Force (ILB)

Head coaching record
- Overall: 15–29

Ron Vanderlinden is a retired American college football coach. Vanderlinden was most recently the linebackers coach at Air Force. He served as the head football coach at the University of Maryland, College Park from 1997 to 2000, compiling a record of 15–29.

Vanderlinden is known for his recruiting ability on the East Coast and within his native state of Michigan.

== Early life ==
A native of Livonia, Michigan, Vanderlinden is one of seven children born to parents Pete and Mary Vanderlinden. His father was one of 14 children born to Dutch immigrants of Flemish descent. Vanderlinden played high school football at Divine Child High School in Dearborn, Michigan, where he was a member of two state championship teams. His high school coach was Bill McCartney, who later became the only high school coach ever hired by University of Michigan coaching legend Bo Schembechler. Vanderlinden reunited with McCartney as a coach after his playing career ended.

== College playing career ==
In college, Vanderlinden played football as a four-year starting center at NCAA Division III Albion College and twice earned All-MIAA conference honors. He was part of the 1976 Albion Britons football team that achieved a perfect 9–0 record. Both the 1976 and 1977 teams have since been inducted into the Albion College Hall of Fame.

== Early coaching career ==
In 1978, he started his career as a graduate assistant at Bowling Green under Denny Stolz and also coached as a graduate assistant at Michigan under Bo Schembechler. His first full-time coaching position was with Ball State, where he served under head coach Dwight Wallace for two seasons. From 1983 to 1991, Vanderlinden was a defensive line coach at Colorado under head coach Bill McCartney, reuniting him with his high school football head coach. McCartney had also been an assistant at Michigan with Vanderlinden. During their time in Boulder, Colorado won the 1990 National Championship. From 1992 to 1996, Vanderlinden served as assistant head coach and defensive coordinator at Northwestern. There he played a part in the reversal of fortunes of a struggling football program into a two-time Big Ten champion. Under his guidance, linebacker Pat Fitzgerald was named the 1995 and '96 Big Ten Defensive Player of the Year, a two-time All-American, and as the winner of the Bednarik Award and Nagurski Award.

== Head coach at Maryland ==
In 1997, Vanderlinden was hired as the head coach of the Maryland Terrapins, a team without a bowl game and only one winning season since 1990. In both the 1999 and 2000 seasons, Maryland narrowly missed achieving a winning season and bowl game bid by losing their finale and ended both years with a 5-6 record.

Vanderlinden's staff recruited players who would be instrumental in the team's meteoric rise in 2001 to an ACC championship, a Bowl Championship Series game, and a top-ten final ranking. Some of these players included linebacker E.J. Henderson, quarterback Shaun Hill, and wide receiver Guilian Gary. Also during Vanderlinden's tenure, running back Lamont Jordan set the school record for single-game rushing with 306 yards. Vanderlinden was fired after the 2000 season, finishing with a 15-29 record overall.

== Later coaching career ==
Vanderlinden joined the Penn State Nittany Lions football team in 2001 as linebackers coach under Joe Paterno, where he oversaw the school's traditional "Linebacker U." He had helped develop a linebacker unit that included All-American 2005 Butkus and 2005/2006 Bednarik award winner Paul Posluszny, a consensus All-American, 2003, All-Big Ten linebacker Gino Capone, and 2006 All-American and 2007 Bednarik Award winner Dan Connor. He has also recruited several prominent players such as Allen Robinson, Sean Lee and Gerald Hodges.

On November 10, 2011 Tom Bradley announced that Vanderlinden and defensive line coach Larry Johnson would serve as co-defensive coordinators.

In 2012, Vanderlinden was retained as linebackers coach under new coach Bill O'Brien.

After parting ways with the Penn State program following the 2013 season, he joined Troy Calhoun's staff at Air Force as linebackers coach, and noted that he had no hard feelings for Penn State nor Bill O'Brien.

== Personal ==
Vanderlinden and his wife, the former Lisa Eckstrom, have one son, Reid, and daughter, Chelsea. Reid is a 2013 graduate of Johns Hopkins University and was a four-year football letterman. He later earned a master's degree at Penn State. Chelsea is an elementary school teacher.

== Head coaching record ==
=== College ===
Year	Team	Overall	Conference	Standing	Bowl/playoffs
Maryland Terrapins (Atlantic Coast Conference) (1997–2000)
1997	Maryland	2–9	1–7	8th	
1998	Maryland	3–8	1–7	T–8th	
1999	Maryland	5–6	2–6	T–8th	
2000	Maryland	5–6	3–5	T–6th	
Maryland:		15–29	7–25		
Total:		15–29			
