= Stan Hixon =

American football player and coach (born 1957)

Biographical details
- Born: June 24, 1957 (age 69); Lakeland, Florida, U.S.

Playing career
- 1976–1978: Iowa State
- Position: Wide receiver

Coaching career (HC unless noted)
- 1980–1982: Morehead State (RB)
- 1983–1988: Appalachian State (WR/TE)
- 1989–1992: South Carolina (WR)
- 1993–1994: Wake Forest (RB)
- 1995–1999: Georgia Tech (WR)
- 2000–2003: LSU (AHC/WR)
- 2004–2009: Washington Redskins (WR)
- 2010–2011: Buffalo Bills (WR)
- 2012–2013: Penn State (AHC/WR)
- 2014–2015: Houston Texans (WR)
- 2017–2018: Temple (WR)

Stan Hixon (born July 24, 1957) is an American football coach and former player. Hixon was most recently the wide receivers coach at Temple.

== Playing career ==
Hixon played four years at Iowa State and accrued career numbers of 46 catches for 776 yards.

== Coaching career ==
Following his graduation, Hixon served as an assistant coach at Morehead State, Appalachian State, South Carolina, Wake Forest, Georgia Tech and LSU before coaching leaving the college ranks for the NFL.

Hixon was the wide receivers coach for the Washington Redskins of the National Football League (NFL) for six years, until January 2010, when his contract was not renewed after the Redskins hired new head coach Mike Shanahan.

Following his departure from Washington, Hixon served as the wide receiver coach under Chan Gailey for the Buffalo Bills from 2010 through 2012.

From 2012 through 2013, Hixon was the assistant head coach and wide receivers coach under Bill O'Brien at Penn State. Hixon then moved to Houston to be the Texans wide receivers coach in 2014, after O'Brien was hired to be the head coach of the Texans.

In March 2017, Hixon joined Geoff Collins' staff at Temple.
