= Zach Zwinak =

American football player (born 1992)

No. 28
- Position: Running back

Personal information
- Born: July 29, 1992 (age 34); Alexandria, Virginia, U.S.
- Listed height: 6 ft 1 in (1.85 m)
- Listed weight: 232 lb (105 kg)

Career information
- High school: Linganore High School
- College: Penn State (2010–2014)
- Stats at Pro Football Reference

Zachary Thomas Zwinak (born July 29, 1992) is an American college football running back who played for the Penn State Nittany Lions from 2010 to 2014. After playing sparingly in his first two seasons, he had a breakout year in 2012.

== Early life ==
The son of B.J. Zwinak and Diane Thomas, Zwinak attended Linganore High School in Frederick, Maryland. He was named all-state after rushing for 1,447 yards as a junior. As a senior, he rushed for 2,109 yards on 164 carries and scored 25 touchdowns.

== Recruiting ==
College recruiting
Name	Hometown	School	Height	Weight	40^{‡}	Commit date
Zach Zwinak; RB	Frederick, Maryland	Linganore High School	6 ft 2 in (1.88 m)	230 lb (100 kg)	4.5	Sep 14, 2009
Zach Zwinak; RB	Recruit ratings: Scout: Rivals:					
Overall recruit ranking:
‡ Refers to 40-yard dash; Note: In many cases, Scout, Rivals, 247Sports, On3, and ESPN may conflict in their listings of height, weight and 40 time.; In these cases, the average was taken. ESPN grades are on a 100-point scale.; Sources: "2010 Team Ranking". Rivals.com.

Zwinak was sought after by numerous FBS schools and was the number two ranked fullback by Rivals and number one ranked fullback by Scout.com. It was Penn State defensive line coach Larry Johnson who was the primary recruiter for Zwinak. Zwinak's other offers included Boston College, Maryland, Michigan, North Carolina, Ohio State, Pittsburgh, Rutgers, Virginia Tech, West Virginia, and Wisconsin.

== College career ==
=== 2010–2011 ===
Zwinak tore his anterior cruciate ligament (ACL) in 2010, his freshman season. He did not appear in any games. He saw the field in two games during his sophomore season. He rushed for a total of seven yards on a three carries.

=== 2012 ===
Coming into his junior year, Zwinak was expected to compete to backup fullback Michael Zordich. After Bill Belton and Derek Day, the two running backs above Zwinak on the depth chart, were hurt early in the year, Zwinak had an opportunity to start at tailback against Temple on September 22. He rushed 18 times for 94 yards. After that, Zwinak held on to the starting tailback spot due to both his success and the ineffectiveness of Belton. On September 29, Zwinak had his first 100+ yard rushing performance as well as his first two career touchdowns against Illinois. The following week against Northwestern, Zwinak again ran for over 100 yards putting up 121 with another touchdown. In Penn State's final game of the season on November 24, 2012, Zwinak had one of the best games of his season by totaling 36 rushes, 179 yards, a touchdown, and a two-point conversion. On November 27, 2012, it was announced that despite not playing for the first few games of the season, Zwinak earned honorable mention all-conference accolades from the media.

=== 2013 ===
A returning 1000-yard rusher, Zwinak ended up being part of a three-man platoon at running back along with Bill Belton and Akeel Lynch, though he got the majority of the goal line carries – by the fourth game of the season, he had rushed for 8 touchdowns – two more than the 2012 season – and 297 yards. His left guard, Miles Dieffenbach, commented, "Yeah, (Zwinak is) a load to handle so we're pretty confident that he's going to push it in there."

=== 2014 ===
Zwinak had a disappointing end to his career at Penn State. During his final season he rushed only 40 times for 112 total yards and scored 3 touchdowns. Despite being one of the leading rushers during the 2013 campaign, Zwinak took a back seat to Bill Belton and Akeel Lynch in new coach James Franklin's offense. Zwinak suffered a season-ending injury on the opening kickoff of the Ohio State game, the seventh game of the season.
