= Matt Stankiewitch =

American football player (born 1990)

No. 54
- Position: Center

Personal information
- Born: February 8, 1990 (age 36); Pottsville, Pennsylvania, U.S.
- Listed height: 6 ft 3 in (1.91 m)
- Listed weight: 302 lb (137 kg)

Career information
- College: Penn State
- NFL draft: 2013: undrafted

Career history
- New England Patriots (2013)*; Jacksonville Jaguars (2014)
- * Offseason or practice squad member only

Awards and highlights
- First-team All-Big Ten (2012)
- Stats at Pro Football Reference

Matt Stankiewitch (born February 8, 1990) is an American former professional football player who was a center in the National Football League (NFL), where he played for the Jacksonville Jaguars in 2014. He played college football for the Penn State Nittany Lions from 2008 to 2012.

== Early life ==
Stankiewitch graduated from Blue Mountain High School in Schuylkill Haven, Pennsylvania in 2008. Stankiewitch was a two-time all-state football player in his junior and senior seasons. He started at left guard in the Under Armour All-America Game and started at center in the Big 33 Football Classic, where he was the Pennsylvania team captain in the game.

== Recruiting ==
College recruiting
Name	Hometown	School	Height	Weight	40^{‡}	Commit date
Matt Stankiewitch; OL	Orwigsburg, PA	Blue Mountain HS (Schuylkill Haven, Pennsylvania)	6 ft 3 in (1.91 m)	293 lb (133 kg)	5.2	Apr 15, 2007
Matt Stankiewitch; OL	Recruit ratings: Scout: Rivals: 247Sports:					
Overall recruit ranking: Scout: 8 (OG) Rivals: 6 (OC) 247Sports: 18 (offensive guard), 14 (PA), 324 (national)
‡ Refers to 40-yard dash; Note: In many cases, Scout, Rivals, 247Sports, On3, and ESPN may conflict in their listings of height, weight and 40 time.; In these cases, the average was taken. ESPN grades are on a 100-point scale.; Sources: "208 Team Ranking". Rivals.com.

== College football career ==
At Penn State, Stankiewitch redshirted in 2008 before starting two games at left guard in 2009. In 2010, Stankiewitch played in six games before missing the rest of the 2010 season due to illness. He returned for the 2011 and 2012 seasons, and finished his Penn State career having made 25 starts at center and two starts at guard, the second-highest among the 2012 senior class. Stankiewitch helped anchor a unit that led the Big Ten in fewest sacks allowed in 2011 (14 in 13 games), and he led Penn State in snaps played in 2011 and 2012 with 966 in 2011.

During the 2012 season, Stankiewitch was awarded five game balls and was a finalist for the Rimington Trophy. He was awarded 1st team all Big Ten as center after the 2012 season. He was instrumental in helping Coach Bill O'Brien's Nittany Lions lead the Big Ten in total offense (437.0 ypg) in conference games and ranking second in scoring offense (32.6 ppg) and second in pass offense (283.1 ypg) against Big Ten foes. Stankiewitch helped the Nittany Lions gain more than 500 yards of total offense three times in conference play, topped by 546 yards against Indiana, its highest total against a Big Ten foe since gaining 557 yards against Michigan State in 2008. Stankiewitch played the most plays on the Penn State football team during Joe Paterno's last season as Penn State's head football coach.

== Professional football career ==
Pre-draft measurables
Height	Weight	Arm length	Hand span	Wingspan	40-yard dash	10-yard split	20-yard split	20-yard shuttle	Three-cone drill	Vertical jump	Broad jump	Bench press
6 ft 2 3/4 in (1.90 m)	302 lb (137 kg)	32 1/2 in (0.83 m)	10 in (0.25 m)	6 ft 6 1/4 in (1.99 m)	5.43 s	1.90 s	3.14 s	4.96 s	7.90 s	24.0 in (0.61 m)	8 ft 2 in (2.49 m)	27 reps
All values from NFL Combine/Pro Day

On April 28, 2013, he was signed as an undrafted free agent by the New England Patriots. On August 5, 2013, Stankiewitch was re-signed by the Patriots.

On December 30, 2013, the Jacksonville Jaguars signed Stankiewitch to reserve/future contract.

He was released from injured reserve on August 20, 2014, after sustaining a left hand fracture.

== Indoor rowing ==
Stankiewitch competed in the Indoor Rowing Americas Continental Qualifier in 2021. He placed 3rd in both the Men's Open 500m and 2000m qualifying for the 2021 World Rowing Indoor Championships (WRICH). He represented the US and competed at the 2021 WRICH where he placed 10th in the Men's Open 2000m and 13th in the Men's Open 500m.

Stankiewitch competed in the Canadian Indoor Rowing Championships in February 2022. He placed 1st in the Men's Open 500m and qualified for the 2022 World Rowing Indoor Championships (WRICH). He represented the US and competed at the 2022 WRICH where he placed 7th in the Men's Open 500m.
