= Gerald Hodges =

American football player (born 1991)

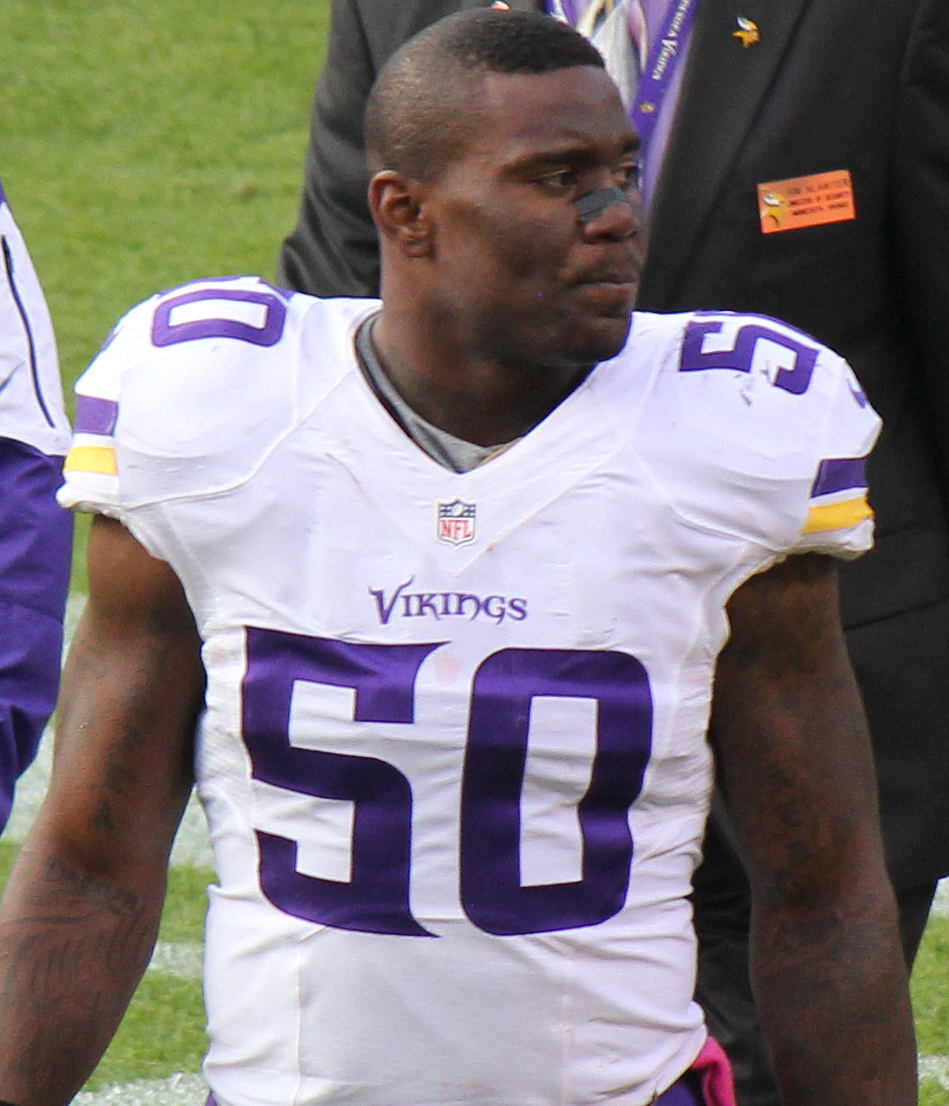
- Hodges with the Minnesota Vikings in 2015

No. 50, 51, 54
- Position: Linebacker

Personal information
- Born: January 17, 1991 (age 35); Woodbury, New Jersey, U.S.
- Listed height: 6 ft 2 in (1.88 m)
- Listed weight: 236 lb (107 kg)

Career information
- High school: Paulsboro (Paulsboro, New Jersey)
- College: Penn State (2009–2012)
- NFL draft: 2013: 4th round, 120th overall pick

Career history
- Minnesota Vikings (2013–2015); San Francisco 49ers (2015–2016); Buffalo Bills (2017)*; New Orleans Saints (2017); Arizona Cardinals (2018)
- * Offseason or practice squad member only

Awards and highlights
- 2× Second-team All-Big Ten (2011, 2012)

Career NFL statistics
- Total tackles: 282
- Sacks: 3.5
- Forced fumbles: 1
- Fumble recoveries: 1
- Interceptions: 3
- Defensive touchdowns: 1
- Stats at Pro Football Reference

Gerald Davon Hodges Jr. (born January 17, 1991) is an American former professional football player who was a linebacker in the National Football League (NFL). He played college football for the Penn State Nittany Lions. He was selected by the Minnesota Vikings in the fourth round, 120th overall, of the 2013 NFL draft.

== Early life ==
A native of Paulsboro, New Jersey, Hodges attended Paulsboro High School, where he lettered in football, wrestling and track. He played mainly as a quarterback and safety on the Red Raiders football team, but also saw time as a return specialist. As a senior, he recorded 61 tackles and grabbed one interception on defense; whilst on offense, he ran for 705 yards on 99 carries and threw for 695 yards and 10 touchdowns, playing a key role in helping Paulsboro win two South Jersey Group I titles and four Colonial Conference Patriot Division championships. He was selected first-team All-South Jersey and first-team All-Conference after his junior and senior seasons.

During high school, Hodges was also a captain of both the wrestling and track and field teams. As a wrestler, he finished third in the state with a 40–1 record as a junior. In track & field, he competed as a member of the relay squads, recording personal-best times of 43.84 seconds in the 4 × 100m and 1:32.58 minutes in the 4 × 200m at the 2007 South Jersey Relays. He was also timed at 4.46 seconds in the 40-yard dash.

Despite having played safety and quarterback in high school, Hodges was rated as the No. 4 overall outside linebacker in the nation by Scout.com. He was recruited heavily by Penn State linebackers coach Ron Vanderlinden. He originally committed to Rutgers, but switched his commitment from Rutgers to the Nittany Lions on December 12, 2008. He also had scholarship offers from Boston College, Pittsburgh, Syracuse, and Iowa, among others.

College recruiting
Name	Hometown	School	Height	Weight	40^{‡}	Commit date
Gerald Hodges; OLB	Paulsboro, New Jersey	Paulsboro High School	6 ft 3 in (1.91 m)	220 lb (100 kg)	4.46	Dec 12, 2008
Gerald Hodges; OLB	Recruit ratings: Scout: Rivals:					
Overall recruit ranking:
‡ Refers to 40-yard dash; Note: In many cases, Scout, Rivals, 247Sports, On3, and ESPN may conflict in their listings of height, weight and 40 time.; In these cases, the average was taken. ESPN grades are on a 100-point scale.; Sources: "2009 Team Ranking". Rivals.com.

== College career ==
While attending Pennsylvania State University, Hodges played for the Penn State Nittany Lions football team from 2009 to 2012.

Hodges saw limited action on defense his true freshman year, but was a significant contributor on special teams, playing in all 13 games and delivering three tackles. He started the year as a safety, but moved to linebacker partway through the year.

In 2010, Hodges was injured on the first play of the game against Alabama. He missed the next four games before coming back with a vengeance against Minnesota and Michigan, games in which he recorded two and three tackles respectively. He ended the year recording at least four tackles in each of the team's final three games.

Hodges enjoyed a breakout season in 2011 in which he led the team by recording 106 tackles. He also recorded 10 tackles for a loss, 2 forced fumbles, and 1 interception which he returned 63 yards against Northwestern. In wake of the NCAA sanctions that stemmed from the Penn State child sex abuse scandal, Hodges had the opportunity to transfer, but he ultimately chose to remain loyal to Penn State. Hodges attributed his loyalty to Penn State to his Christian faith. He said, "Every day I wake up and thank God because we could have just been forgotten about. God puts people in my life that are going to help me no matter the situation. He's put coaches in my life that are going to help me out and further my career. Everything, it seems, is working out for the better. I know it might not seem like that ... but when you look deeper and deeper into bowl games and championships, (God) did this for a reason."

Coming into the 2012 season, Hodges was named a preseason first-team All-American by Lindy's College Football Preview as well as first-team All Big Ten. New coach Bill O'Brien briefly toyed with the idea of using Hodges as a kick returner during the team's first game against the Ohio Bobcats, but stopped after Hodges muffed a punt. In the third game of the year against Navy, Hodges recorded an interception to go along with five tackles. Hodges enjoyed his best game of the season on October 6 against Northwestern when he recorded 11 tackles and a forced fumble. Hodges had another excellent game on November 17 against Indiana in which he recorded 12 tackles and a diving interception. It was announced after Penn State's last game that Hodges had been named second-team All-Big Ten.

== Professional career ==
=== Pre-draft ===
Prior to the draft, NFL.com graded Hodges at 72/100, listing him as a second to third round pick who should be an eventual starter in the NFL and compared him to former linebacker Quincy Black, who was selected in the third round of the 2007 NFL draft by the Tampa Bay Buccaneers. Matt Miller of Bleacher Report considered Hodges a fifth-round pick, while NFL analyst Mel Kiper Jr. graded him as a possible third-rounder. CBS Sports had Hodges ranked as the 17th-best linebacker prospect in the draft.

At the NFL Combine, Hodges completed 22 reps on the weight bench at 225 pounds (13th best among linebackers).

Pre-draft measurables
Height	Weight	Arm length	Hand span	Wingspan	40-yard dash	10-yard split	20-yard split	20-yard shuttle	Three-cone drill	Vertical jump	Broad jump	Bench press
6 ft 1 in (1.85 m)	243 lb (110 kg)	32 in (0.81 m)	9 in (0.23 m)	6 ft 4 in (1.93 m)	4.78 s	1.67 s	2.78 s	4.29 s	7.27 s	35.0 in (0.89 m)	9 ft 11 in (3.02 m)	22 reps
All values from NFL Combine and PSU's Pro Day

=== Minnesota Vikings ===
Hodges was selected by the Minnesota Vikings in the fourth round, with the 120th overall pick of the 2013 NFL draft. Hodges signed a four-year, $2.515 million deal with the Vikings on May 14, 2013. After the signing of Jasper Brinkley, Hodges and Brinkley switched jerseys. Due to the injury of Anthony Barr, Hodges was able to have a breakout season topping his rookie season expectations. He ended his 2014 season with 66 combined tackles, 0.5 sacks, an interception for a touchdown, and 7 pass deflections.

=== San Francisco 49ers ===
On October 6, 2015, the Vikings traded Hodges to the San Francisco 49ers for center Nick Easton and a sixth round pick in the 2016 NFL draft.

In 2016, Hodges played in 15 games with 12 starts, recording career-highs of 83 tackles, 3 sacks, and two interceptions.

=== Buffalo Bills ===
On May 25, 2017, Hodges signed with the Buffalo Bills. He was released on September 3, 2017.

=== New Orleans Saints ===
On October 11, 2017, Hodges signed with the New Orleans Saints. He was released by the Saints on February 27, 2018.

=== Arizona Cardinals ===
On August 13, 2018, Hodges signed with the Arizona Cardinals. He played in 16 games with six starts, finishing sixth on the team with 55 tackles.

=== Retirement ===
On April 6, 2019, Hodges announced his retirement from the NFL. In May 2019, Hodges announced on his Twitter account that he wanted to play again.

== NFL career statistics ==
Legend
**Bold**	Career high

Year	Team	Games		Tackles					Interceptions					Fumbles			
Year	Team	GP	GS	Cmb	Solo	Ast	Sck	TFL	Int	Yds	TD	Lng	PD	FF	FR	Yds	TD
2013	MIN	11	0	5	4	1	0.0	0	0	0	0	0	0	0	0	0	0
2014	MIN	14	7	66	51	15	0.5	2	1	**27**	**1**	**27**	**6**	0	0	0	0
2015	MIN	4	3	20	14	6	0.0	0	0	0	0	0	1	0	0	0	0
2015	SFO	10	4	50	39	11	0.0	**4**	0	0	0	0	0	0	0	0	0
2016	SFO	15	**12**	**83**	**55**	**28**	**3.0**	3	**2**	**27**	0	21	2	**1**	**1**	0	0
2017	NOR	11	0	3	3	0	0.0	0	0	0	0	0	0	0	0	0	0
2018	ARI	**16**	6	55	44	11	0.0	2	0	0	0	0	0	0	0	0	0
		81	32	282	210	72	3.5	11	3	54	1	27	9	1	1	0	0
