= 2016 United States House of Representatives elections in New York =

- November 8, 2016

All 27 New York seats to the United States House of Representatives
	Majority party	Minority party
Party	Democratic	Republican
Last election	18	9
Seats won	18	9
Seat change	Steady	Steady
Popular vote	4,456,967	2,525,426
Percentage	62.81%	35.59%
Swing	▲7.68%	▼7.06%

Democratic hold
Republican hold
Democratic
40–50%
50–60%
60–70%
70–80%
80–90%
90–100%
Republican
40–50%
50–60%
60–70%
70–80%

The 2016 United States House of Representatives elections in New York were held on November 8, 2016, to elect 27 U.S. representatives from the state of New York. The elections coincided with the 2016 U.S. presidential election, as well as other elections to the House of Representatives, elections to the United States Senate and various state and local elections. The primaries took place on June 28.

In the general election, 18 Democrats and nine Republicans prevailed. No incumbents were defeated.

== Overview ==
United States House of Representatives elections in New York, 2016
Party	Votes	Percentage	Seats	+/–
Democratic	4,202,200	59.05%	18	
Republican	2,140,917	30.08%	9	
Conservative	337,169	4.74%	0	
Working Families	192,553	2.71%	0	
Independence	92,199	1.30%	0	
Women's Equality	45,990	0.65%	0	
Reform	41,204	0.58%	0	
Green	28,193	0.40%	0	
Other Party Lines	28,683	0.40%	0	
Write-ins	7,316	0.10%	0	
Totals	7,116,424	100.00%	27	

Popular vote
Democratic	59.05%
Republican	30.08%
Other	10.87%

House seats by party nomination
Democratic	66.67%
Women's Equality	44.44%
Working Families	40.74%
Republican	33.33%
Conservative	33.33%
Independence	33.33%
Reform	29.63%

House seats by party registration
Democratic	66.67%
Republican	33.33%

== District 1 ==
2016 New York's 1st congressional district election
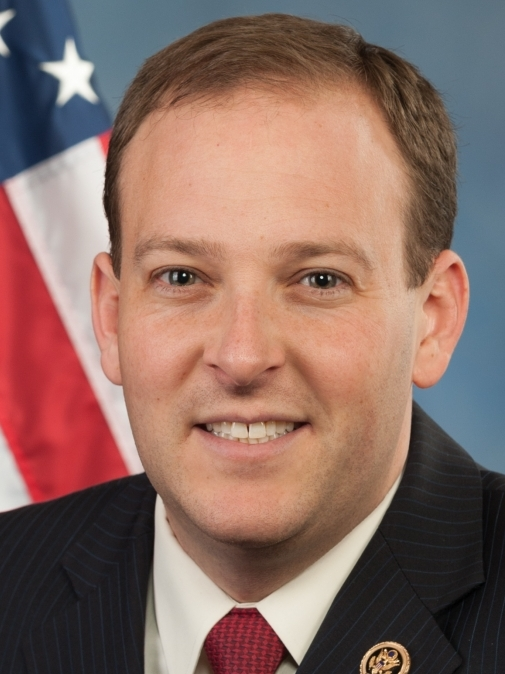

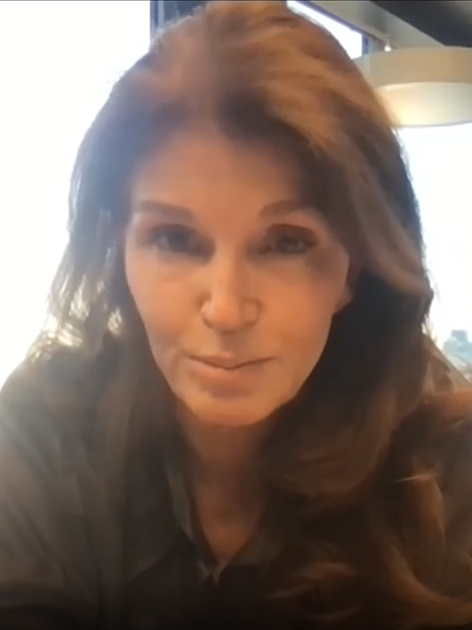
	Majority party	Minority party
Candidate	Lee Zeldin	Anna Throne-Holst
Party	Republican	Democratic
Alliance	Independence; Conservative; Reform	Working Families; Women's Equality
Popular vote	188,499	135,278
Percentage	58.2%	41.8%
- Zeldin: 50–60% 60–70% 70–80% 80–90% Throne-Holst: 50–60% 60–70% 70–80% 80–90% >90% Tie: 50% No votes
U.S. Representative before election
Lee Zeldin
Republican
Elected U.S. Representative
Lee Zeldin
Republican

The 1st district is located in eastern Long Island and includes most of central and eastern Suffolk County. The incumbent was Republican Lee Zeldin, who had represented the district since 2015, ran for re-election. He was first elected in 2014 with 53% of the vote, defeating Democratic incumbent Tim Bishop. The district had a PVI of R+2.

=== Republican primary ===
==== Candidates ====
===== Nominee =====
- Lee Zeldin, incumbent U.S. representative

=== Democratic primary ===
==== Candidates ====
===== Nominee =====
- Anna Throne-Holst, Southampton town supervisor

===== Eliminated in primary =====
- David Calone, Suffolk County Planning Commission chair

===== Declined =====
- Kara Hahn, Suffolk County legislator
- Mark Lesko, former Brookhaven supervisor

==== Endorsements ====
David Calone

Individuals

- Barry M. McCoy, physicist
Anna Throne-Holst

U.S. senators

- Kirsten Gillibrand, U.S. senator from New York (2009–present)

U.S. representatives

- Tim Bishop, U.S. representative from this district (2003–2015)
- Steny Hoyer, U.S. representative from Maryland's 5th congressional district (1981–present)
- Steve Israel, U.S. representative from New York's 3rd congressional district (2001–present)

Labor unions

- New York State United Teachers
- Service Employees International Union

Organizations

- EMILY's List

==== Results ====
Throne-Holst won the primary by 417 votes.

Democratic primary results
Party	Candidate	Votes	%
Democratic	Anna E. Throne-Holst	6,481	51.3
Democratic	David L. Calone	6,162	48.7
Total votes		12,643	100.0

=== General election ===
==== Endorsements ====
Lee Zeldin (R)

Organizations

- National Republican Congressional Committee "Patriot" Program
Anna Throne-Holst (D)

U.S. senators

- Kirsten Gillibrand, U.S. senator from New York (2009-present)

U.S. representatives

- Tim Bishop, U.S. representative from New York's 1st congressional district (2003–2015)
- Steny Hoyer, U.S. representative from Maryland's 5th congressional district (1981–present)
- Steve Israel, U.S. representative from New York's 3rd congressional district (2001–present)
- Jerrold Nadler, U.S. representative from New York's 10th congressional district (1992–present)
- Paul Tonko, U.S. representative from New York's 20th congressional district (2009–present)

Labor unions

- New York State United Teachers

Organizations

- Democratic Congressional Campaign Committee "Red to Blue" Program
- EMILY's List

==== Debates ====
2016 New York's 1st congressional district debates
No.	Date	Host	Moderator	Link	Republican	Democratic
Key: P Participant A Absent N Not invited I Invited W Withdrawn						
Key: P Participant A Absent N Not invited I Invited W Withdrawn					Lee Zeldin	Anna Throne-Holst
1	Oct. 13, 2016	League of Women Voters of The Hamptons; SEA-TV	Carol Mellor		P	P
2	Oct. 22, 2016	News 12 Networks	Stone Grissom		P	P

==== Polling ====
Poll source	Date(s) administered	Sample size	Margin of error	Lee Zeldin (R)	Anna Throne-Holst (D)	Undecided
Siena College	October 27–31, 2016	607	± 4.0%	57%	36%	6%
Siena College	September 27 – October 2, 2016	661	± 3.8%	53%	38%	9%

==== Predictions ====
Source	Ranking	As of
The Cook Political Report	Likely R	November 7, 2016
Daily Kos Elections	Likely R	November 7, 2016
Rothenberg	Lean R	November 3, 2016
Sabato's Crystal Ball	Lean R	November 7, 2016
RCP	Tossup	October 31, 2016

==== Results ====
New York's 1st congressional district, 2016
Party	Candidate	Votes	%
Republican	Lee Zeldin	158,409	48.9
Conservative	Lee Zeldin	23,327	7.2
Independence	Lee Zeldin	5,920	1.8
Reform	Lee Zeldin	843	0.3
Total	Lee Zeldin (incumbent)	188,499	58.2
Democratic	Anna Throne-Holst	126,635	39.1
Working Families	Anna Throne-Holst	6,147	1.9
Women's Equality	Anna Throne-Holst	2,496	0.8
Total	Anna Throne-Holst	135,278	41.8
Total votes		323,777	100.0
Republican hold			

== District 2 ==
2016 New York's 2nd congressional district election
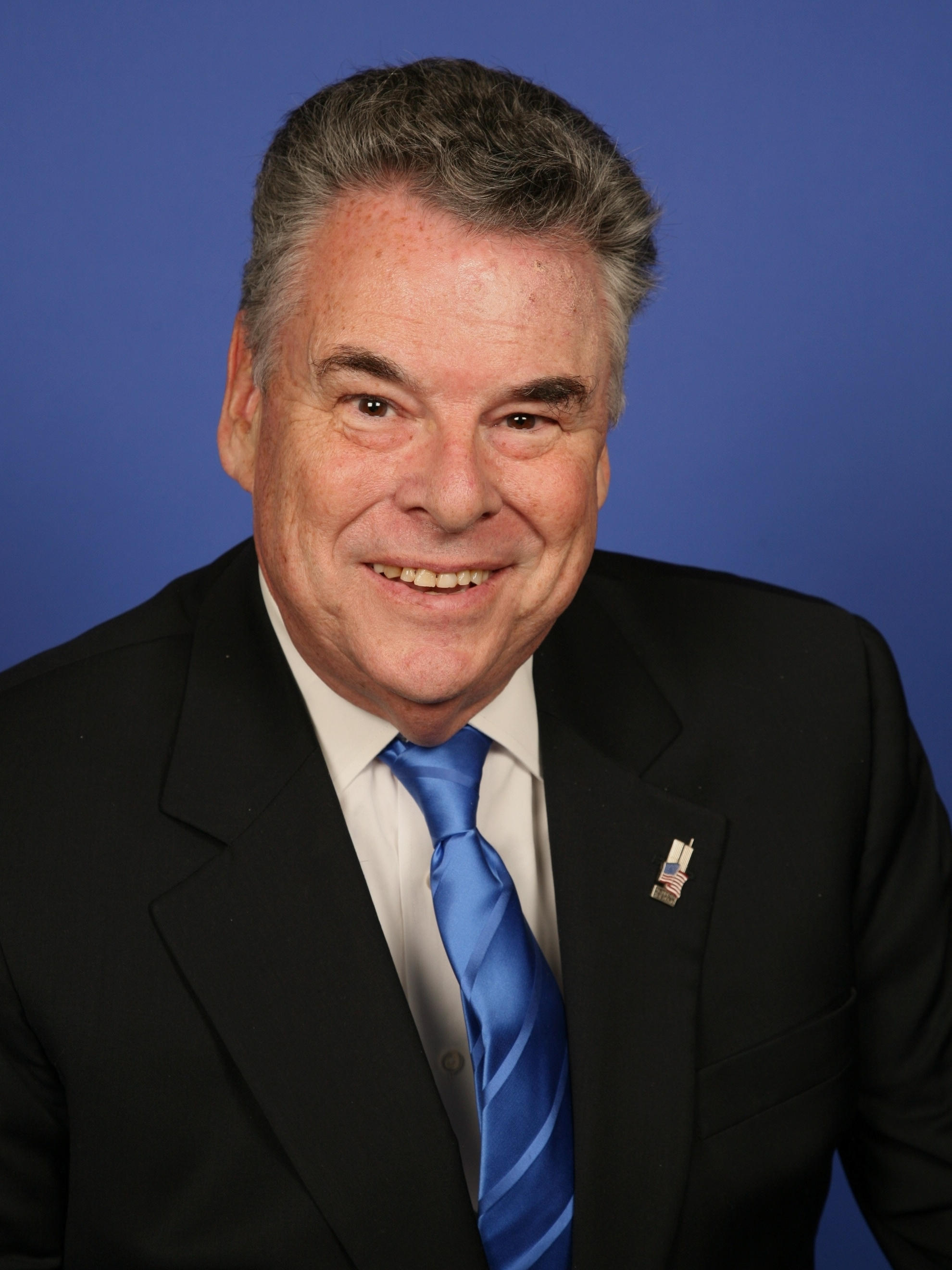

	Majority party	Minority party
Candidate	Peter T. King	DuWayne Gregory
Party	Republican	Democratic
Alliance	Conservative; Reform	Working Families; Women's Equality; Independence
Popular vote	181,221	110,812
Percentage	62.1%	39.7%
- County results King: 50–60% 70–80%
U.S. Representative before election
Peter T. King
Republican
Elected U.S. Representative
Peter T. King
Republican

The 2nd district is based along the South Shore of Long Island and includes southwestern Suffolk County and a small portion of southeastern Nassau County. The incumbent was Republican Peter T. King, who had represented the district since 2013, and previously represented the 3rd district from 1993 to 2013. He was re-elected with 65% of the vote in 2014. The district had a PVI of R+1.

=== Republican primary ===
==== Candidates ====
===== Nominee =====
- Peter King, incumbent U.S. representative

=== Democratic primary ===
==== Candidates ====
===== Nominee =====
- DuWayne Gregory, presiding officer of the Suffolk County Legislature

===== Declined =====
- Martin Tankleff, attorney

=== General election ===
==== Endorsements ====
DuWayne Gregory (D)

Labor unions

- New York State United Teachers

==== Predictions ====
Source	Ranking	As of
The Cook Political Report	Safe R	November 7, 2016
Daily Kos Elections	Safe R	November 7, 2016
Rothenberg	Safe R	November 3, 2016
Sabato's Crystal Ball	Safe R	November 7, 2016
RCP	Safe R	October 31, 2016

==== Results ====
New York's 2nd congressional district, 2016
Party	Candidate	Votes	%
Republican	Peter T. King	157,321	53.9
Conservative	Peter T. King	21,778	7.5
Reform	Peter T. King	2,122	0.7
Total	Peter T. King (incumbent)	181,221	62.1
Democratic	DuWayne Gregory	102,162	35.0
Working Families	DuWayne Gregory	4,008	1.4
Independence	DuWayne Gregory	3,207	1.1
Women's Equality	DuWayne Gregory	1,435	0.5
Total	DuWayne Gregory	110,812	37.9
Total votes		292,033	100.0
Republican hold			

== District 3 ==
2016 New York's 3rd congressional district election
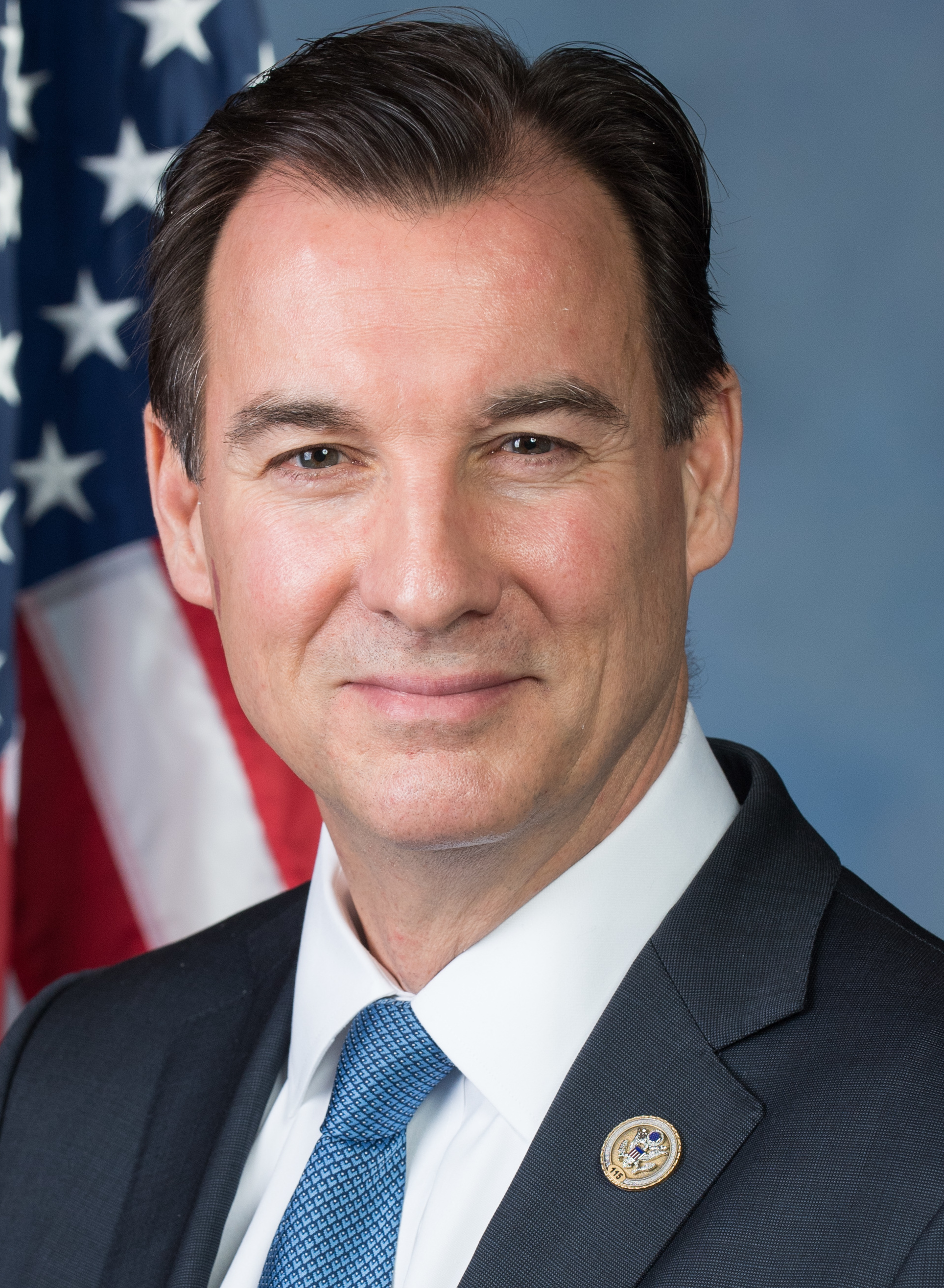

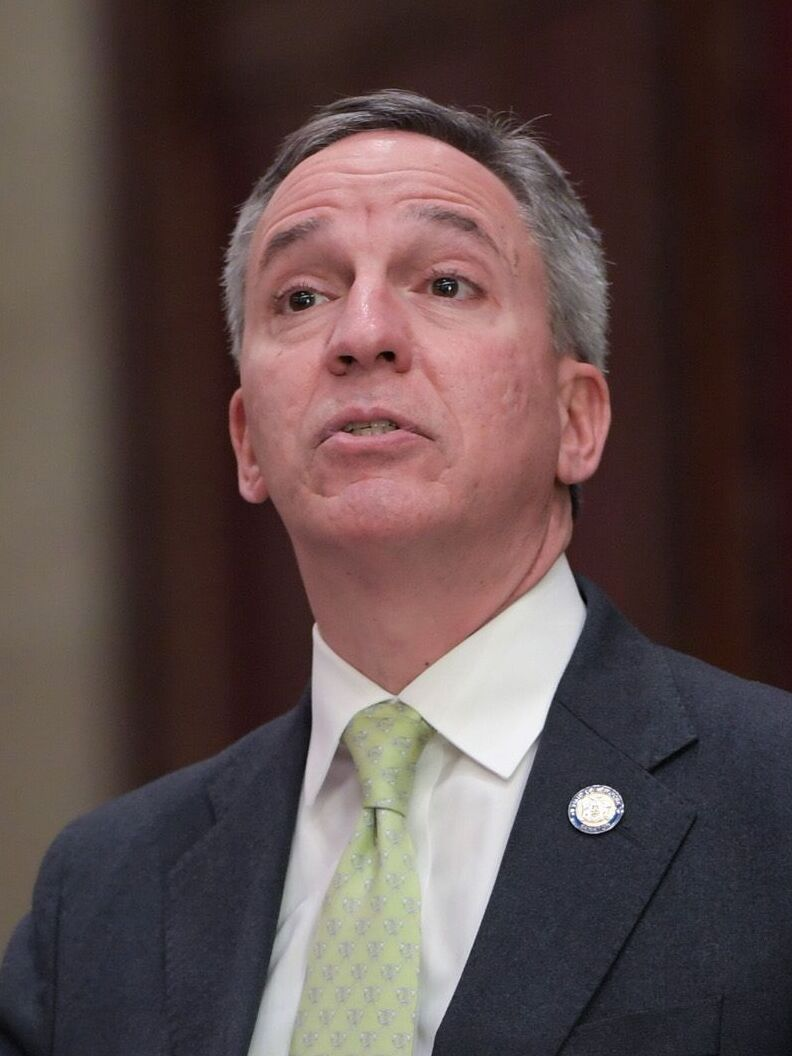
	Majority party	Minority party
Candidate	Tom Suozzi	Jack Martins
Party	Democratic	Republican
Alliance		Conservative; Reform
Popular vote	167,758	149,577
Percentage	52.9%	47.1%
- County results Suozzi: 50–60% 60–70% Martins: 50–60%
U.S. Representative before election
Steve Israel
Democratic
Elected U.S. Representative
Tom Suozzi
Democratic

The 3rd district is based along the north shore of Long Island and includes portions of Nassau and Suffolk Counties. The incumbent, Democrat Steve Israel, had represented northern Long Island since 2000 (as the 2nd district from 2000 to 2012 and the 3rd district since then) and announced he would not seek re-election on January 5, 2016.

=== Democratic primary ===
==== Candidates ====
===== Nominee =====
- Tom Suozzi, former Nassau County executive & mayor of Glen Cove

===== Eliminated in primary =====
- Joseph C. Clarke, perennial candidate
- Jonathan Kaiman, former North Hempstead town supervisor and chair of Nassau County finance board
- Anna Kaplan, North Hempstead town council member
- Steve Stern, Suffolk County legislator, 16th district; businessman

===== Declined =====
- Judi Bosworth, Nassau County legislator, 10th district
- Steve Israel, incumbent U.S. representative
- Lori Scheinman, philanthropist
- William Spencer, Suffolk County legislator, 18th district
- Robert Zimmerman, Long Island Economic development commissioner

==== Endorsements ====
Anna Kaplan

Organizations

- EMILY's List
Steve Stern

U.S. representatives

- Steve Israel, U.S. representative from New York's 3rd congressional district (2001–present)

Labor unions

- Service Employees International Union

==== Debate ====
2016 New York's 3rd congressional district Democratic primary debate
No.	Date	Host	Moderator	Link	Democratic	Democratic	Democratic	Democratic	Democratic
Key: P Participant A Absent N Not invited I Invited W Withdrawn									
Key: P Participant A Absent N Not invited I Invited W Withdrawn					Jonathan Clarke	Jon Kaiman	Anna Kaplan	Steve Stern	Tom Suozzi
1	May 17, 2016	Great Neck Democratic Club	Larry Levy		P	P	P	P	P

==== Results ====
Democratic primary results
Party	Candidate	Votes	%
Democratic	Tom Suozzi	7,142	35.1
Democratic	Steve Stern	4,475	22.0
Democratic	Jon Kaiman	4,394	21.6
Democratic	Anna Kaplan	3,311	16.3
Democratic	Jonathan C. Clarke	1,021	5.0
Total votes		20,343	100.0

=== Republican primary ===
==== Candidates ====
===== Nominee =====
- Jack Martins, state senator

===== Withdrawn =====
- Philip Pidot, businessman, former fraud investigator and Fox News commentator

===== Declined =====
- Chad Lupinacci, state assembly member
- Rob Trotta, Suffolk legislator

==== Endorsements ====
Philip Pidot

Organizations

- Michelle Malkin, author and syndicated columnist

=== General election ===
==== Endorsements ====
Thomas Suozzi (D)

Labor unions

- New York State United Teachers

Organizations

- Democratic Congressional Campaign Committee "Red to Blue" Program
Jack Martins (R)

Organizations

- National Republican Congressional Committee "Young Guns" Program

==== Debates ====
- Complete video of debate, October 26, 2016

==== Predictions ====
Source	Ranking	As of
The Cook Political Report	Lean D	November 7, 2016
Daily Kos Elections	Likely D	November 7, 2016
Rothenberg	Lean D	November 3, 2016
Sabato's Crystal Ball	Likely D	November 7, 2016
RCP	Lean D	October 31, 2016

==== Results ====
Suozzi defeated Martins in the general election.

New York's 3rd congressional district, 2016
Party	Candidate	Votes	%
Democratic	Tom Suozzi	167,758	52.9
Republican	Jack Martins	131,534	41.4
Conservative	Jack Martins	16,134	5.1
Reform	Jack Martins	1,909	0.6
Total	Jack Martins	149,577	47.1
Total votes		317,335	100.0
Democratic hold			

== District 4 ==
2016 New York's 4th congressional district election
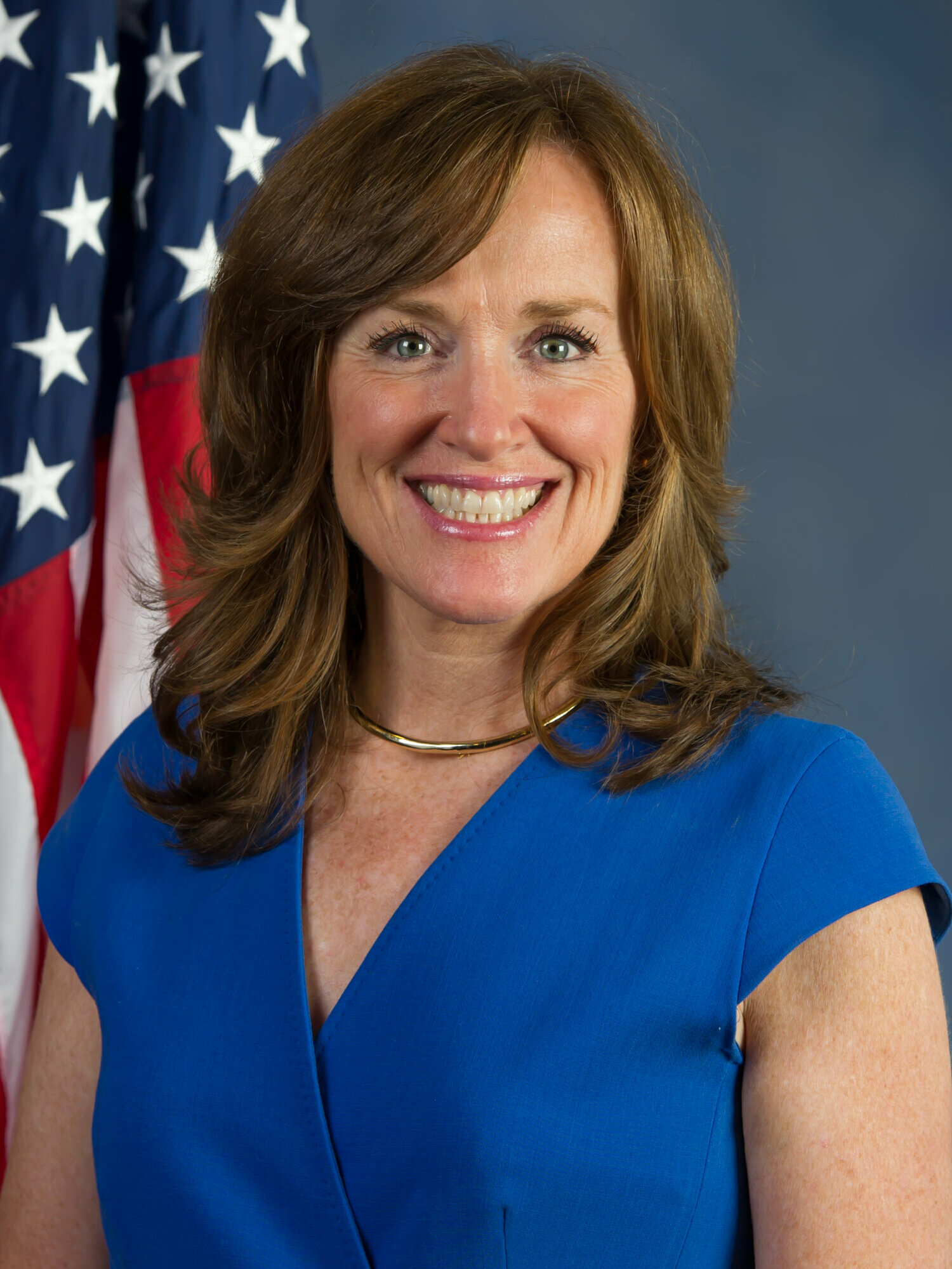

	Majority party	Minority party
Candidate	Kathleen Rice	David Gurfein
Party	Democratic	Republican
Alliance	Women's Equality	Conservative; Reform
Popular vote	185,286	125,865
Percentage	59.5%	40.5%
- County results Rice: 50–60%
U.S. Representative before election
Kathleen Rice
Democratic
Elected U.S. Representative
Kathleen Rice
Democratic

The 4th district was located in central and southern Nassau County. Incumbent Democrat Kathleen Rice, who had represented the district since 2014, ran for re-election. She was elected with 53% of the vote in 2014. The district had a PVI of D+3.

=== Democratic primary ===
==== Candidates ====
===== Nominee =====
- Kathleen Rice, incumbent U.S. representative

=== Republican primary ===
==== Candidates ====
===== Nominee =====
- David Gurfein, retired U.S. Marine Corps lieutenant colonel

=== General election ===
==== Predictions ====
Source	Ranking	As of
The Cook Political Report	Safe D	November 7, 2016
Daily Kos Elections	Safe D	November 7, 2016
Rothenberg	Safe D	November 3, 2016
Sabato's Crystal Ball	Safe D	November 7, 2016
RCP	Safe D	October 31, 2016

==== Results ====
New York's 4th congressional district, 2016
Party	Candidate	Votes	%
Democratic	Kathleen Rice	180,748	58.1
Women's Equality	Kathleen Rice	4,538	1.4
Total	Kathleen Rice (incumbent)	185,286	59.5
Republican	David Gurfein	110,736	35.6
Conservative	David Gurfein	14,083	4.5
Reform	David Gurfein	1,046	0.3
Total	David Gurfein	125,865	40.5
Total votes		311,151	100.0
Democratic hold			

== District 5 ==
2016 New York's 5th congressional district election
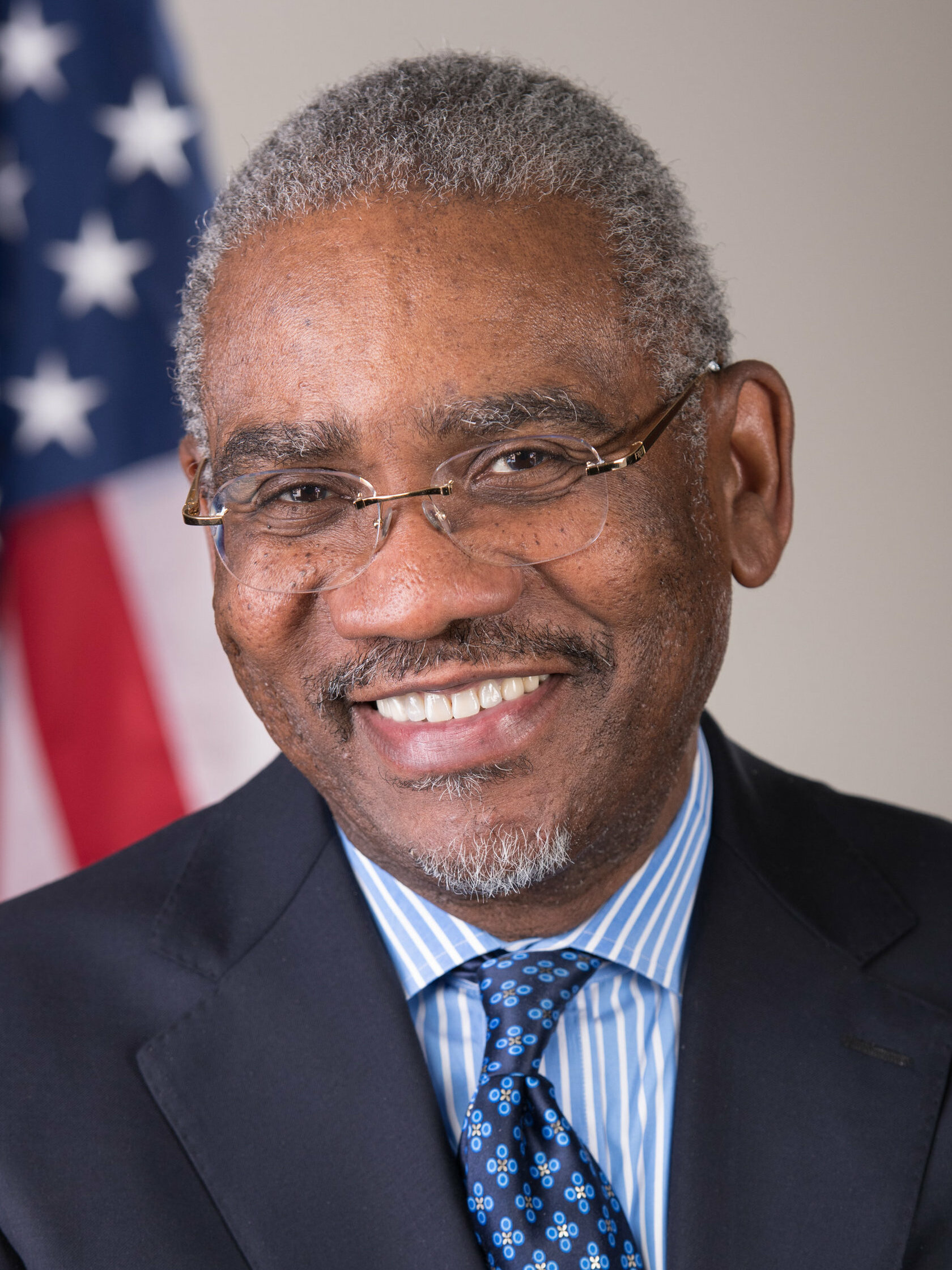

	Majority party	Minority party
Candidate	Gregory Meeks	Michael A. O'Reilly
Party	Democratic	Republican
Alliance	Women's Equality	Conservative
Popular vote	199,552	30,257
Percentage	85.5%	13.0%
- County results Meeks: 70–80% 80–90%
U.S. Representative before election
Gregory Meeks
Democratic
Elected U.S. Representative
Gregory Meeks
Democratic

The 5th district is mostly located entirely within Queens in New York City, but also includes a small portion of Nassau County. The incumbent was Democrat Gregory Meeks, who had represented the district since 2013 and previously represented the 6th district from 1998 to 2013. He was re-elected in 2012 with 90% of the vote. The district had a PVI of D+35.

=== Democratic primary ===
==== Candidates ====
===== Nominee =====
- Gregory Meeks, incumbent U.S. representative

===== Eliminated in primary =====
- Ali A. Mirza

==== Results ====
Democratic primary results
Party	Candidate	Votes	%
Democratic	Gregory Meeks (incumbent)	7,056	81.7
Democratic	Ali A. Mirza	1,579	18.3
Total votes		8,635	100.0

=== Republican primary ===
==== Candidates ====
===== Nominee =====
- Michael O'Reilly

=== General election ===
==== Endorsements ====
Gregory Meeks (D)

Labor unions

- New York State United Teachers

==== Predictions ====
Source	Ranking	As of
The Cook Political Report	Safe D	November 7, 2016
Daily Kos Elections	Safe D	November 7, 2016
Rothenberg	Safe D	November 3, 2016
Sabato's Crystal Ball	Safe D	November 7, 2016
RCP	Safe D	October 31, 2016

==== Results ====
New York's 5th congressional district, 2016
Party	Candidate	Votes	%
Democratic	Gregory Meeks	197,591	84.7
Women's Equality	Gregory Meeks	1,961	0.8
Total	Gregory Meeks (incumbent)	199,552	85.5
Republican	Michael A. O'Reilly	26,741	11.5
Conservative	Michael A. O'Reilly	3,516	1.5
Total	Michael A. O'Reilly	30,257	13.0
Green	Frank Francois	3,583	1.5
Total votes		233,392	100.0
Democratic hold			

== District 6 ==
2016 New York's 6th congressional district election
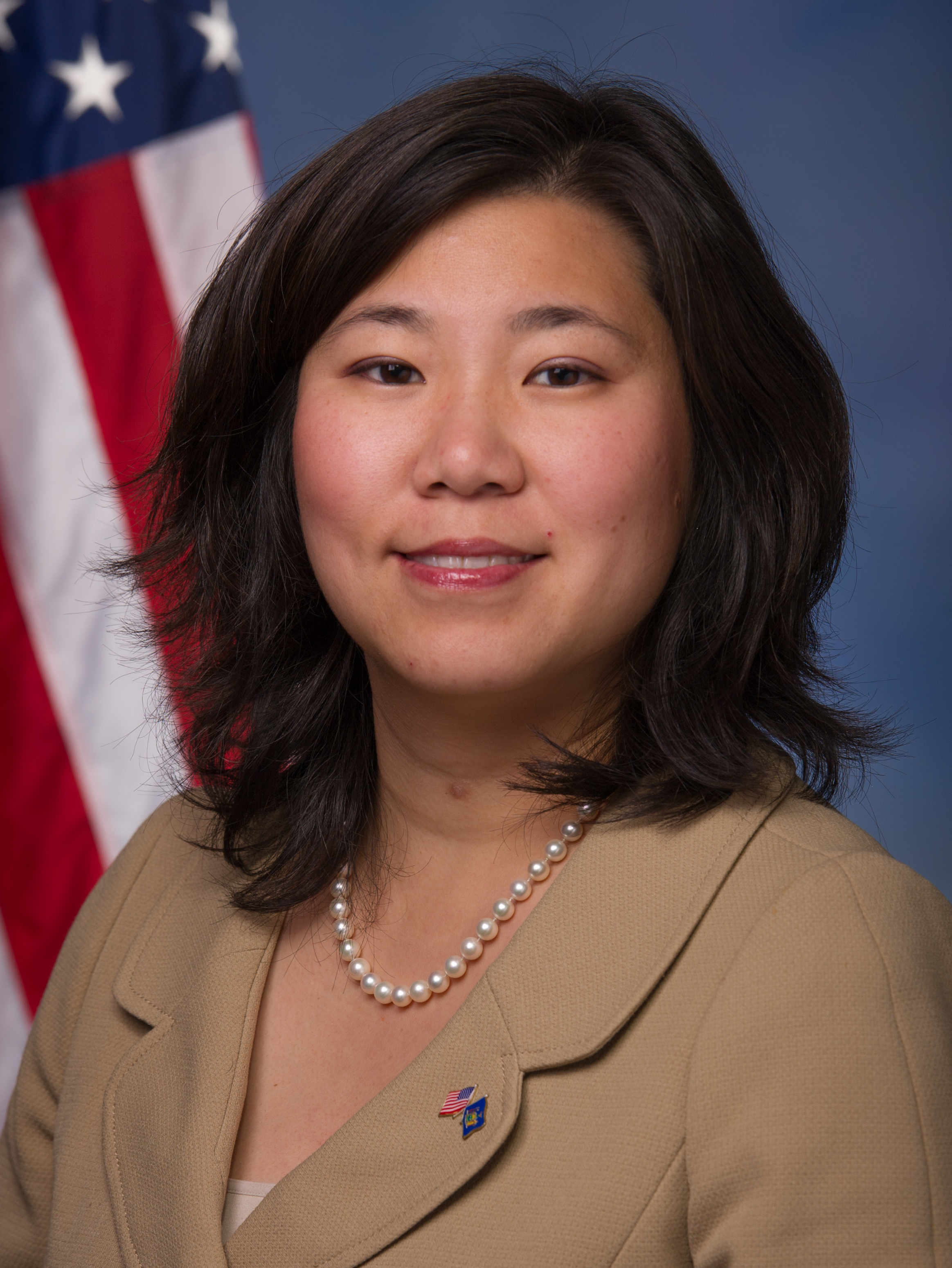

	Majority party	Minority party
Candidate	Grace Meng	Danniel S. Maio
Party	Democratic	Republican
Alliance	Women's Equality	Conservative; Blue Lives Matter
Popular vote	136,506	50,617
Percentage	72.2%	26.7%
- County results Meng: 70–80%
U.S. Representative before election
Grace Meng
Democratic
Elected U.S. Representative
Grace Meng
Democratic

The 6th district is located entirely within Queens in New York City. Incumbent Democrat Grace Meng, who had represented the district since 2013, ran for re-election. She was re-elected in 2014, winning the general election with 100% of the vote. The district had a PVI of D+13.

=== Democratic primary ===
==== Candidates ====
===== Nominee =====
- Grace Meng, incumbent U.S. representative

=== Republican primary ===
==== Candidates ====
===== Nominee =====
- Danniel S. Maio, co-owner of the Identity Map Company

=== General election ===
==== Endorsements ====
Grace Meng (D)

Labor unions

- New York State United Teachers

==== Predictions ====
Source	Ranking	As of
The Cook Political Report	Safe D	November 7, 2016
Daily Kos Elections	Safe D	November 7, 2016
Rothenberg	Safe D	November 3, 2016
Sabato's Crystal Ball	Safe D	November 7, 2016
RCP	Safe D	October 31, 2016

==== Results ====
New York's 6th congressional district, 2016
Party	Candidate	Votes	%
Democratic	Grace Meng	131,463	69.5
Women's Equality	Grace Meng	5,043	2.7
Total	Grace Meng (incumbent)	136,506	72.2
Republican	Danniel S. Maio	43,770	23.1
Conservative	Danniel S. Maio	4,875	2.6
Blue Lives Matter	Danniel S. Maio	1,972	1.0
Total	Danniel S. Maio	50,617	26.7
Haris Bhatti Party	Haris Bhatti	2,123	1.1
Total votes		189,246	100.0
Democratic hold			

== District 7 ==
2016 New York's 7th congressional district election
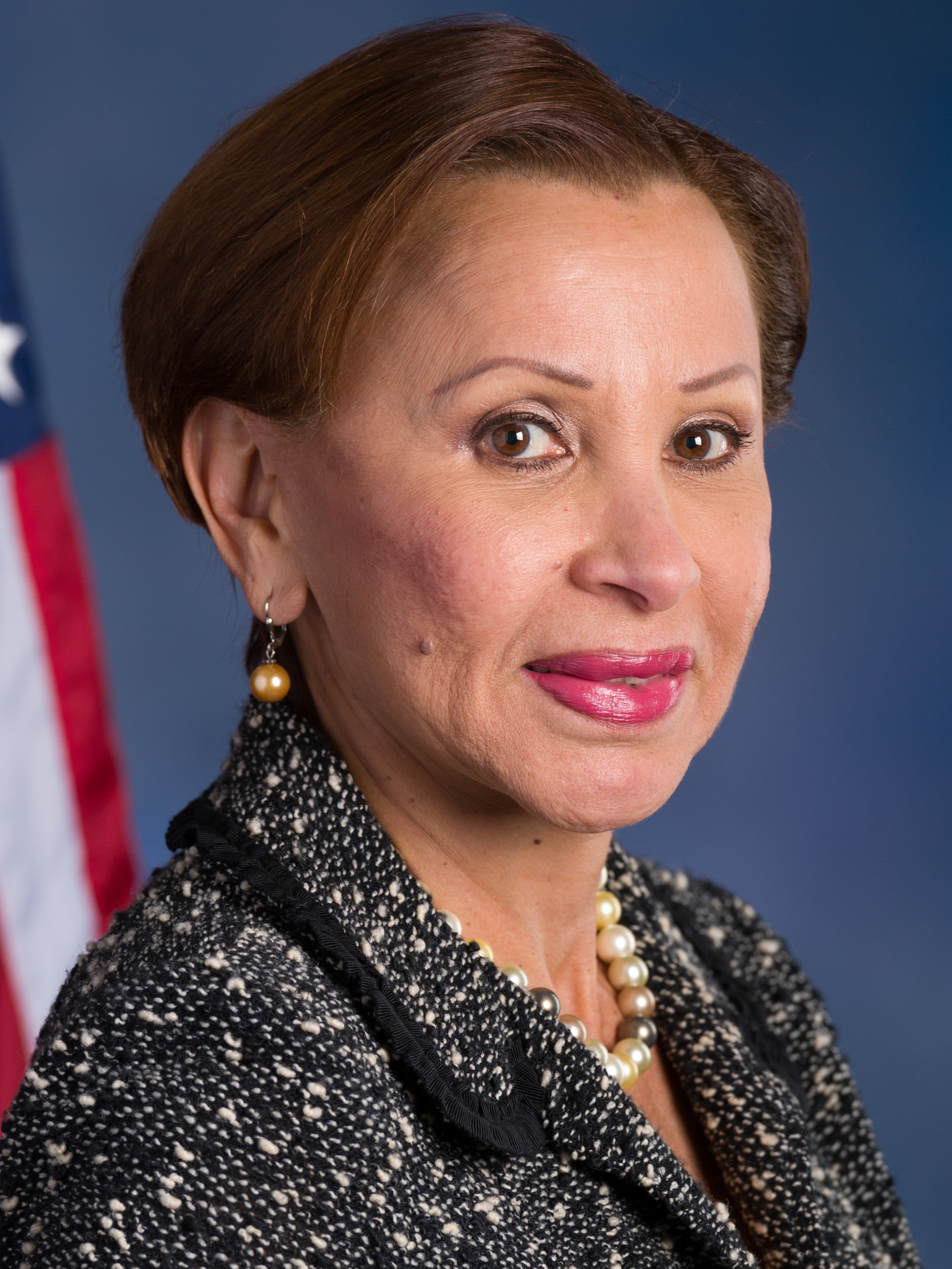

	Majority party	Minority party
Candidate	Nydia Velázquez	Allan E. Romaguera
Party	Democratic	Republican
Alliance	Women's Equality	Conservative
Popular vote	172,146	17,478
Percentage	90.8%	9.2%
- County results Velázquez: 80–90% >90%
U.S. Representative before election
Nydia Velázquez
Democratic
Elected U.S. Representative
Nydia Velázquez
Democratic

The 7th district is located entirely in New York City and includes parts of Brooklyn, Queens, and Manhattan. Incumbent Democrat, Nydia Velázquez, who had represented the district since 2013, and previously represented the 12th district from 1993 to 2013, ran for re-election. She was re-elected in 2014 with 56% of the vote. The district had a PVI of D+34.

=== Democratic primary ===
==== Candidates ====
===== Nominee =====
- Nydia Velázquez, incumbent U.S. representative

===== Eliminated in primary =====
- Jeffrey M. Kurzon, attorney
- Yungman F. Lee, banking executive

==== Endorsements ====
Nydia Velázquez (D)

Local officials

- Brad Lander, NYC Councilor

==== Results ====
Democratic primary results
Party	Candidate	Votes	%
Democratic	Nydia M. Velázquez (incumbent)	10,162	62.1
Democratic	Yungman F. Lee	4,479	27.3
Democratic	Jeffrey M. Kurzon	1,736	10.6
Total votes		16,377	100.0

=== Republican primary ===
==== Candidates ====
===== Nominee =====
- Allan E. Romaguera

=== General election ===
==== Endorsements ====
Nydia Velázquez (D)

Labor unions

- New York State United Teachers

Organizations

- EMILY's List

==== Predictions ====
Source	Ranking	As of
The Cook Political Report	Safe D	November 7, 2016
Daily Kos Elections	Safe D	November 7, 2016
Rothenberg	Safe D	November 3, 2016
Sabato's Crystal Ball	Safe D	November 7, 2016
RCP	Safe D	October 31, 2016

==== Results ====
New York's 7th congressional district, 2016
Party	Candidate	Votes	%
Democratic	Nydia Velázquez	165,819	87.4
Women's Equality	Nydia Velázquez	6,327	3.3
Total	Nydia Velázquez (incumbent)	172,146	90.8
Republican	Allan E. Romaguera	14,941	7.9
Conservative	Allan E. Romaguera	2,537	1.3
Total	Allan E. Romaguera	17,478	9.2
Total votes		189,624	100.0
Democratic hold			

== District 8 ==
2016 New York's 8th congressional district election
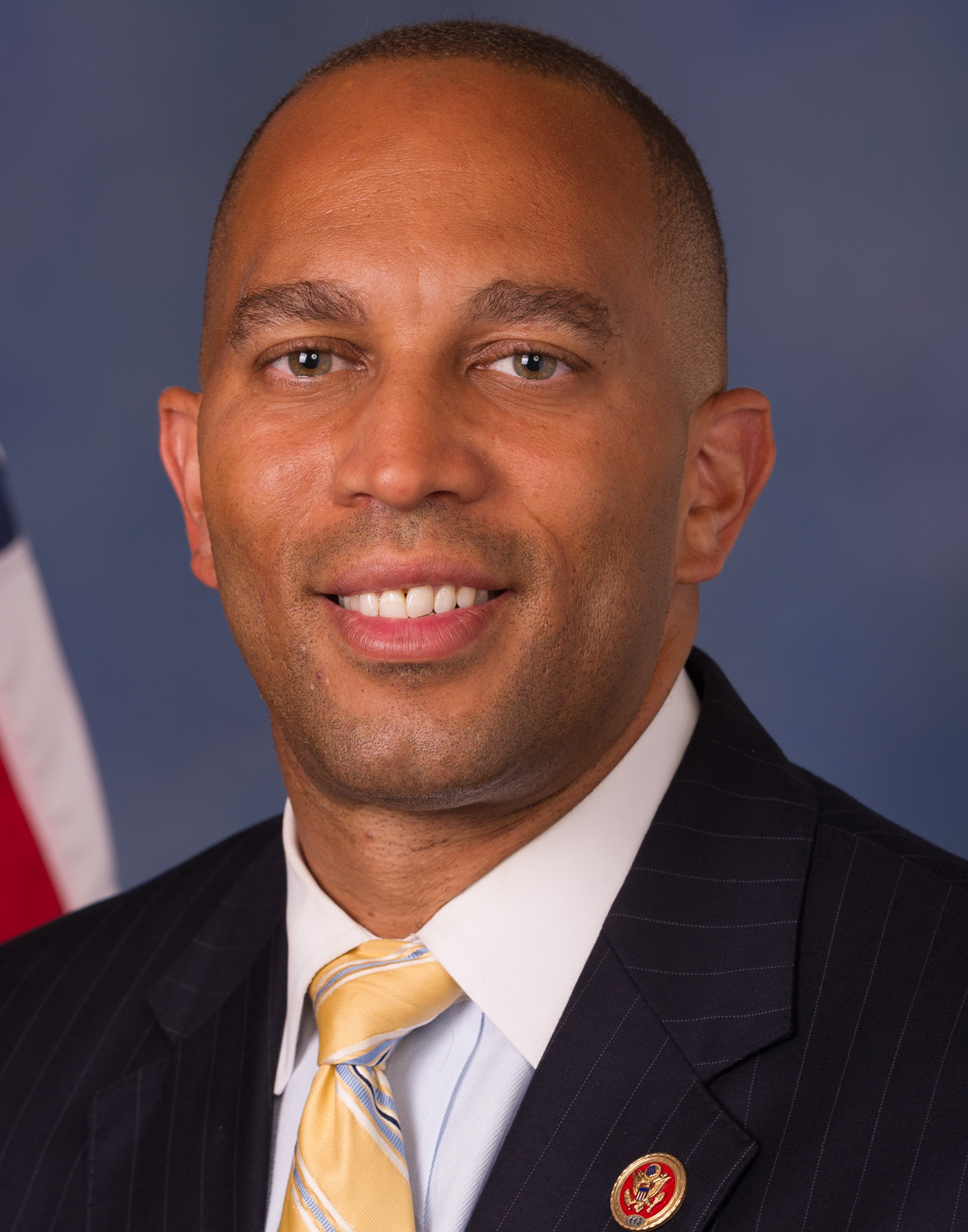

	Majority party	Minority party
Candidate	Hakeem Jeffries	Daniel J. Cavanagh
Party	Democratic	Conservative
Alliance	Working Families
Popular vote	214,595	15,401
Percentage	93.3%	6.7%
- County results Jeffries: 70–80% >90%
U.S. Representative before election
Hakeem Jeffries
Democratic
Elected U.S. Representative
Hakeem Jeffries
Democratic

The 8th district is located entirely in the New York City boroughs of Brooklyn and Queens. Incumbent Democrat Hakeem Jeffries, who had represented the district since 2013, ran for re-election. He was re-elected in 2014, winning the general election with 84% of the vote. The district had a PVI of D+35.

=== Democratic primary ===
==== Candidates ====
===== Nominee =====
- Hakeem Jeffries, incumbent U.S. representative

Jeffries also received the Working Families nomination.

=== Republican primary ===
No Republicans filed.

=== Conservative primary ===
==== Candidates ====
===== Nominee =====
- Daniel J. Cavanagh

=== General election ===
==== Endorsements ====
Hakeem Jeffries (D)

Labor unions

- New York State United Teachers

==== Predictions ====
Source	Ranking	As of
The Cook Political Report	Safe D	November 7, 2016
Daily Kos Elections	Safe D	November 7, 2016
Rothenberg	Safe D	November 3, 2016
Sabato's Crystal Ball	Safe D	November 7, 2016
RCP	Safe D	October 31, 2016

==== Results ====
New York's 8th congressional district, 2016
Party	Candidate	Votes	%
Democratic	Hakeem Jeffries	203,235	88.4
Working Families	Hakeem Jeffries	11,360	4.9
Total	Hakeem Jeffries (incumbent)	214,595	93.3
Conservative	Daniel J. Cavanagh	15,401	6.7
Total votes		229,996	100.0
Democratic hold			

== District 9 ==
2016 New York's 9th congressional district election
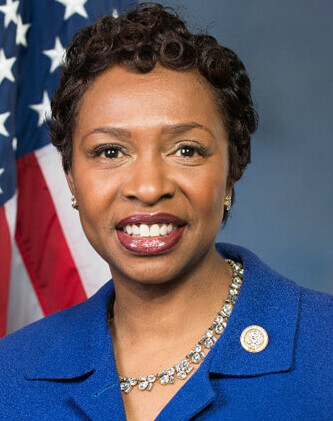

	Majority party	Minority party
Candidate	Yvette Clarke	Alan Bellone
Party	Democratic	Conservative
Alliance	Working Families
Popular vote	214,189	17,576
Percentage	92.4%	7.6%
- County results Clarke: >90%
U.S. Representative before election
Yvette Clarke
Democratic
Elected U.S. Representative
Yvette Clarke
Democratic

The 9th district is located entirely within the New York City borough of Brooklyn. Incumbent Democrat Yvette Clarke, who had represented the district since 2013 and previously represented the 11th district from 2007 to 2013, ran for re-election. She was re-elected in 2014 with 89.5% of the vote. The district had a PVI of D+32.

=== Democratic primary ===
==== Candidates ====
===== Nominee =====
- Yvette Clarke, incumbent U.S. representative

Clarke also received the Working Families nomination.

=== Republican primary ===
No Republicans filed.

=== Conservative primary ===
==== Candidates ====
===== Nominee =====
- Alan Bellone

=== General election ===
==== Endorsements ====
Yvette Clarke (D)

Labor unions

- New York State United Teachers

==== Predictions ====
Source	Ranking	As of
The Cook Political Report	Safe D	November 7, 2016
Daily Kos Elections	Safe D	November 7, 2016
Rothenberg	Safe D	November 3, 2016
Sabato's Crystal Ball	Safe D	November 7, 2016
RCP	Safe D	October 31, 2016

==== Results ====
New York's 9th congressional district, 2016
Party	Candidate	Votes	%
Democratic	Yvette Clarke	198,886	85.8
Working Families	Yvette Clarke	15,303	6.6
Total	Yvette Clarke (incumbent)	214,189	92.4
Conservative	Alan Bellone	17,576	7.6
Total votes		231,765	100.0
Democratic hold			

== District 10 ==
2016 New York's 10th congressional district election
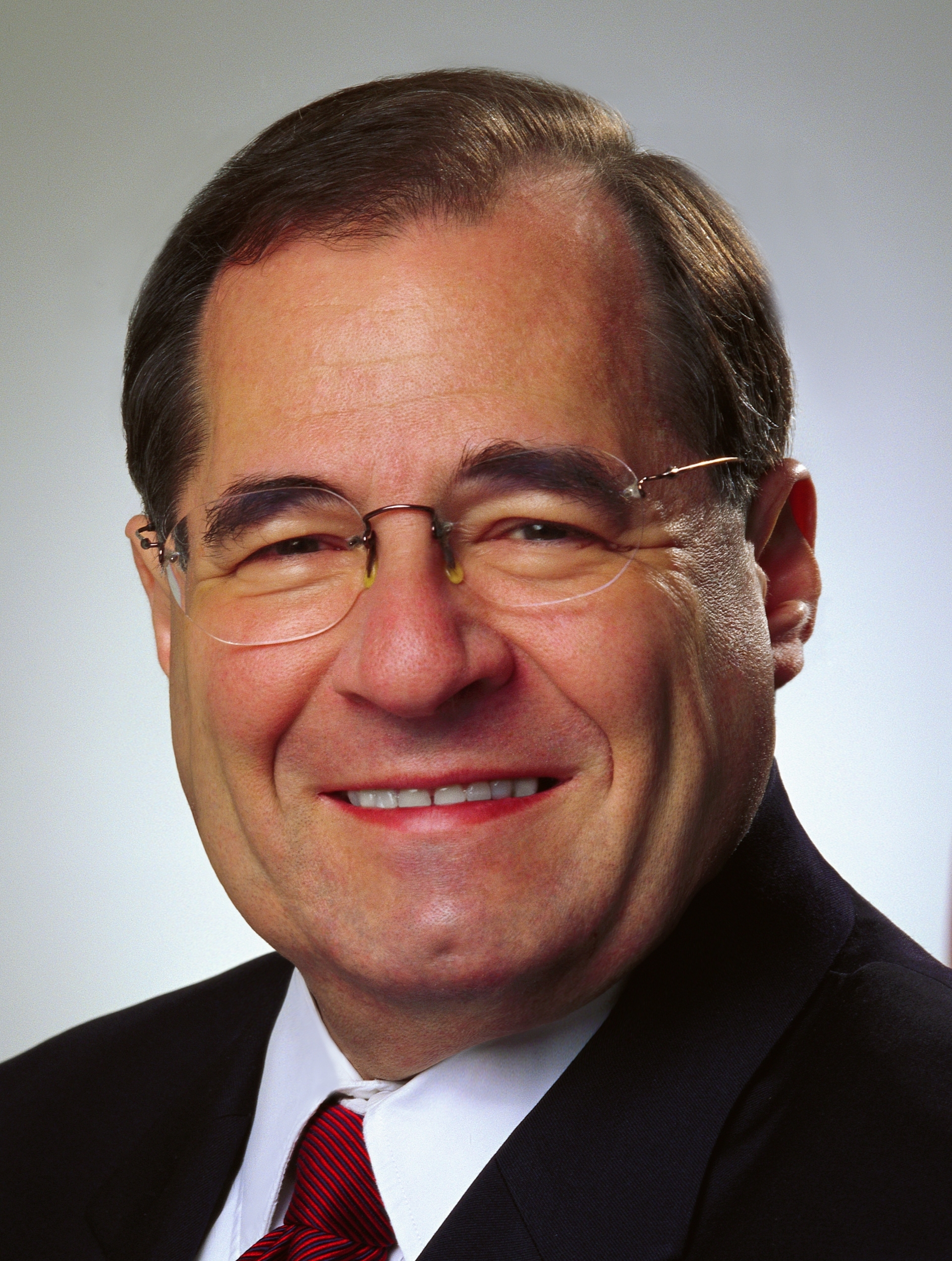

	Majority party	Minority party
Candidate	Jerrold Nadler	Philip Rosenthal
Party	Democratic	Republican
Alliance	Working Families; Women's Equality	Independence; Conservative; Stop Iran Deal
Popular vote	192,371	58,857
Percentage	78.1%	21.9%
- County results Nadler: 50–60% 80–90%
U.S. Representative before election
Jerrold Nadler
Democratic
Elected U.S. Representative
Jerrold Nadler
Democratic

The 10th district is located in New York City and includes the Upper West Side of Manhattan, the west side of Lower Manhattan, including Greenwich Village and the Financial District, and parts of Brooklyn, including Borough Park. The incumbent was Democrat Jerrold Nadler, who had represented the district since 2013 and previously represented the 8th district from 1993 to 2013 and the 17th district from 1992 to 1993. He was re-elected in 2014 with 82% of the vote. The district had a PVI of D+23.

=== Democratic primary ===
==== Candidates ====
===== Nominee =====
- Jerrold Nadler, incumbent U.S. representative

===== Eliminated in primary =====
- Mikhail Oliver Rosenberg, former investment banker

==== Endorsements ====
Jerry Nadler

Executive officials

- Barack Obama, President of the United States

Federal officials

- Chuck Schumer, U.S. Senator from New York

Newspapers & magazines

- The New York Times
Mikhail Oliver Rosenberg

State officials

- Dov Hikind, state assemblyman

Newspapers & magazines

- New York Daily News
- The New York Observer

Individuals

- Jackie Mason, comedian and actor

==== Results ====
Democratic primary results
Party	Candidate	Votes	%
Democratic	Jerrold Nadler (incumbent)	27,270	89.5
Democratic	Mikhail Oliver Rosenberg	3,206	10.5
Total votes		30,476	100.0

=== Republican primary ===
==== Candidates ====
===== Nominee =====
- Philip Rosenthal, physicist, lawyer, and entrepreneur

=== General election ===
==== Endorsements ====
Jerrold Nadler (D)

Labor unions

- New York State United Teachers
Philip Rosenthal (R)

U.S. representatives

- Dan Donovan, U.S. representative from New York's 11th congressional district (2015–present)

State legislators

- Dov Hikind, state assembly member (D)

==== Predictions ====
Source	Ranking	As of
The Cook Political Report	Safe D	November 7, 2016
Daily Kos Elections	Safe D	November 7, 2016
Rothenberg	Safe D	November 3, 2016
Sabato's Crystal Ball	Safe D	November 7, 2016
RCP	Safe D	October 31, 2016

==== Results ====
New York's 10th congressional district, 2016
Party	Candidate	Votes	%
Democratic	Jerrold Nadler	180,117	73.1
Working Families	Jerrold Nadler	10,471	4.3
Women's Equality	Jerrold Nadler	1,783	0.7
Total	Jerrold Nadler (incumbent)	192,371	78.1
Republican	Philip Rosenthal	46,275	18.8
Conservative	Philip Rosenthal	4,646	1.9
Independence	Philip Rosenthal	2,093	0.9
Stop Iran Deal	Philip Rosenthal	843	0.3
Total	Philip Rosenthal	53,857	21.9
Total votes		246,228	100.0
Democratic hold			

== District 11 ==
2016 New York's 11th congressional district election
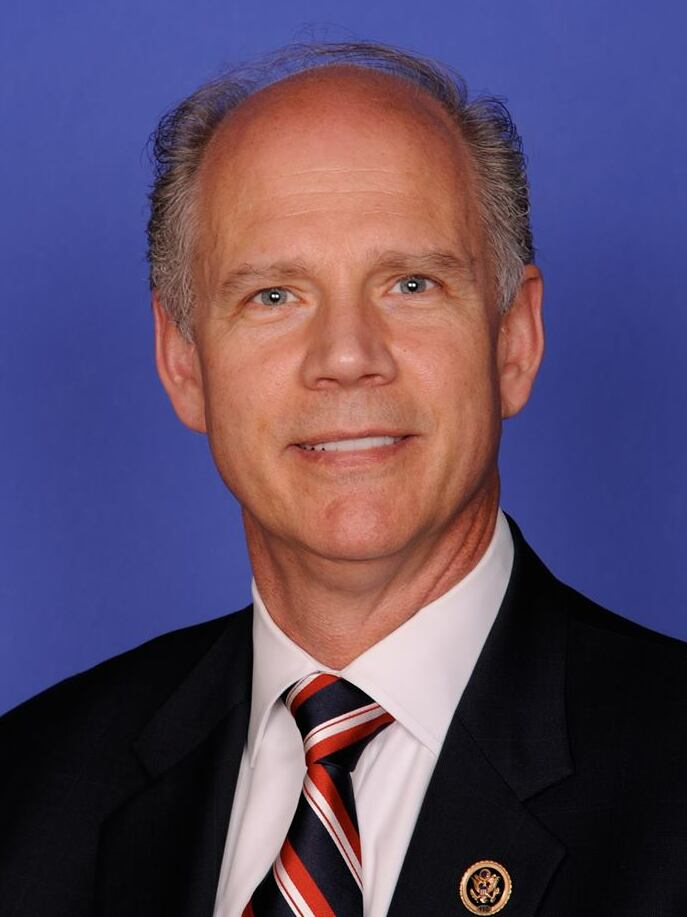

	Majority party	Minority party
Candidate	Dan Donovan	Richard A. Reichard
Party	Republican	Democratic
Alliance	Independence; Conservative; Reform
Popular vote	142,934	85,257
Percentage	61.6%	36.7%
- County results Donovan: 50–60% 60–70%
U.S. Representative before election
Dan Donovan
Republican
Elected U.S. Representative
Dan Donovan
Republican

The 11th district is located entirely in New York City and includes all of Staten Island and parts of southern Brooklyn. The incumbent was Republican Dan Donovan, who took office in 2015 after the resignation of Republican Michael Grimm. Donovan took office after winning a 2015 special election over Democrat Vincent J. Gentile. The district had a Cook Partisan Voting Index (PVI) of R+2.

=== Republican primary ===
==== Candidates ====
===== Nominee =====
- Dan Donovan, incumbent U.S. representative

=== Democratic primary ===
==== Candidates ====
===== Nominee =====
- Richard Reichard, former president of the Staten Island Democratic Association

=== General election ===
==== Endorsements ====
Dan Donovan (R)

Labor unions

- New York State United Teachers

Organizations

- National Republican Congressional Committee "Patriot" Program

==== Predictions ====
Source	Ranking	As of
The Cook Political Report	Safe R	November 7, 2016
Daily Kos Elections	Safe R	November 7, 2016
Rothenberg	Safe R	November 3, 2016
Sabato's Crystal Ball	Safe R	November 7, 2016
RCP	Safe R	October 31, 2016

==== Results ====
New York's 11th congressional district, 2016
Party	Candidate	Votes	%
Republican	Dan Donovan	122,606	52.8
Conservative	Dan Donovan	12,824	5.6
Independence	Dan Donovan	5,636	2.4
Reform	Dan Donovan	1,868	0.8
Total	Dan Donovan (incumbent)	142,934	61.6
Democratic	Richard A. Reichard	85,257	36.7
Green	Henry J. Bardel	3,906	1.7
Total votes		232,097	100.0
Republican hold			

== District 12 ==
2016 New York's 12th congressional district election
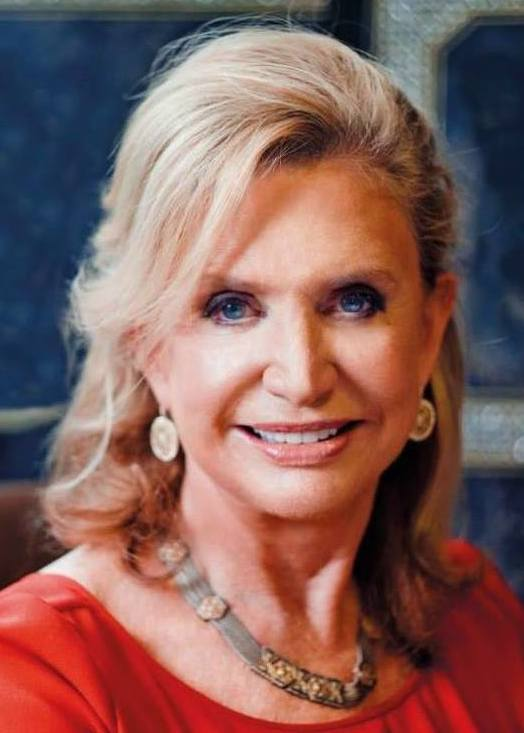

	Majority party	Minority party
Candidate	Carolyn Maloney	Robert Ardini
Party	Democratic	Republican
Alliance	Working Families
Popular vote	244,358	49,398
Percentage	83.2%	16.8%
- County results Maloney: 80–90% >90%
U.S. Representative before election
Carolyn Maloney
Democratic
Elected U.S. Representative
Carolyn Maloney
Democratic

The 12th district is located entirely in New York City and includes several neighborhoods in the East Side of Manhattan, Greenpoint and western Queens. The incumbent was Democrat Carolyn Maloney, who had represented the district since 2013, and previously represented the 14th district from 1993 to 2013. She was re-elected in 2014 with 84% of the vote. The district had a PVI of D+27.

=== Democratic primary ===
==== Candidates ====
===== Nominee =====
- Carolyn Maloney, incumbent U.S. representative

===== Eliminated in primary =====
- Peter Lindner, two-time MIT grad in statistical analysis

===== Declined =====
- David Eisenbach, historian, professor and communications director for Mike Gravel's 2008 presidential campaign

==== Results ====
Democratic primary results
Party	Candidate	Votes	%
Democratic	Carolyn B. Maloney (incumbent)	15,101	90.1
Democratic	Peter Lindner	1,654	9.9
Total votes		16,755	100.0

=== Republican primary ===
==== Candidates ====
===== Nominee =====
- Robert Ardini, small business owner

=== General election ===
==== Endorsements ====
Carolyn Maloney (D)

Labor unions

- New York State United Teachers

==== Predictions ====
Source	Ranking	As of
The Cook Political Report	Safe D	November 7, 2016
Daily Kos Elections	Safe D	November 7, 2016
Rothenberg	Safe D	November 3, 2016
Sabato's Crystal Ball	Safe D	November 7, 2016
RCP	Safe D	October 31, 2016

==== Results ====
New York's 12th congressional district, 2016
Party	Candidate	Votes	%
Democratic	Carolyn Maloney	230,153	78.3
Working Families	Carolyn Maloney	14,205	4.8
Total	Carolyn Maloney (incumbent)	244,358	83.2
Republican	Robert Ardini	49,398	16.8
Total votes		293,756	100.0
Democratic hold			

== District 13 ==
2016 New York's 13th congressional district election
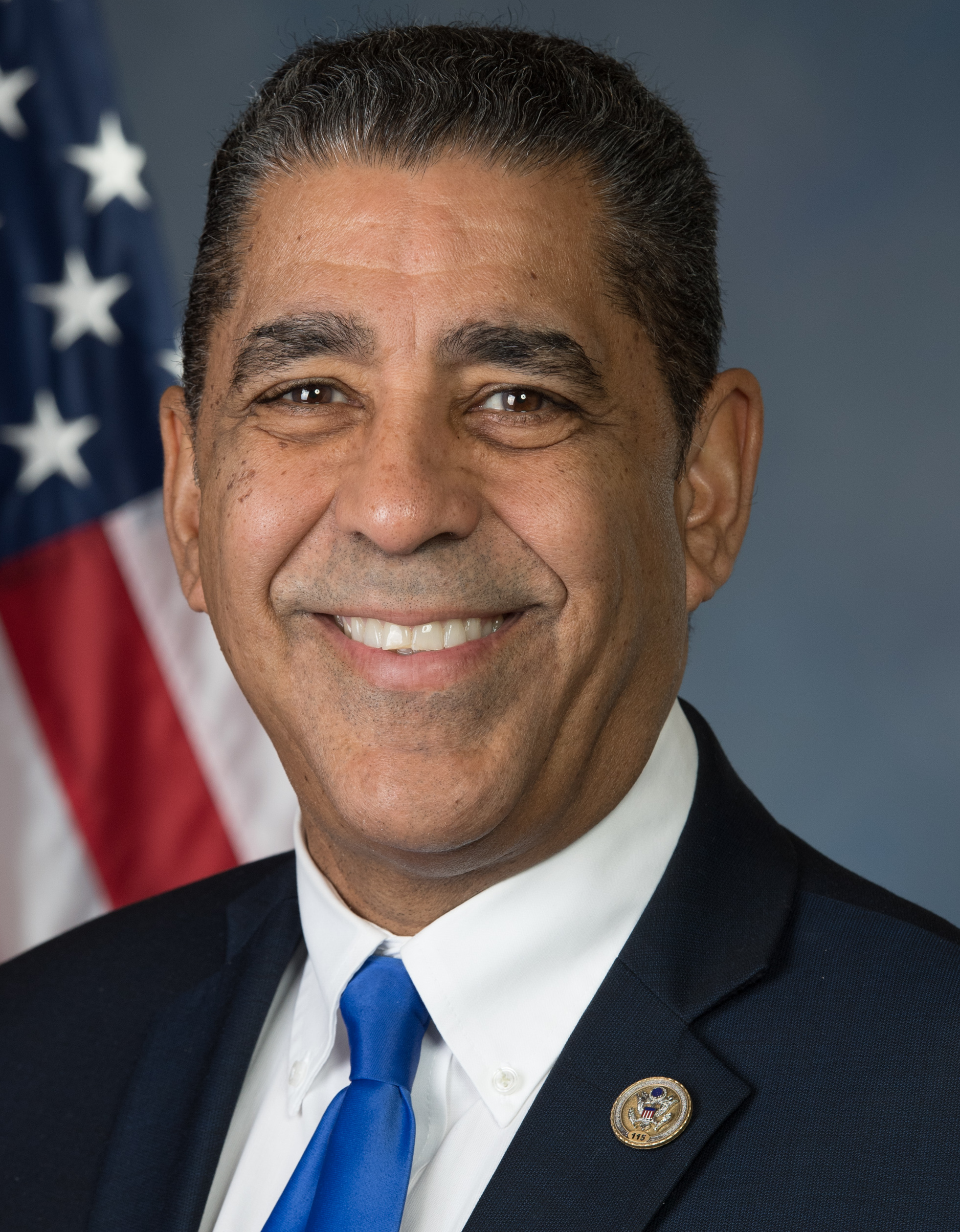

	Majority party	Minority party
Candidate	Adriano Espaillat	Robert A. Evans, Jr.
Party	Democratic	Republican
Alliance		Independence
Popular vote	207,194	16,089
Percentage	88.8%	6.9%
- County results Espaillat: 80–90%
U.S. Representative before election
Charles Rangel
Democratic
Elected U.S. Representative
Adriano Espaillat
Democratic

The 13th district is located entirely in New York City and includes Upper Manhattan and a small portion of the western Bronx. The incumbent was Democrat Charles Rangel, who had represented the district since 2013, and previously represented the 15th district from 1993 to 2013, the 16th district from 1983 to 1993, the 19th district from 1973 to 1983 and the 18th district from 1971 to 1973. He was re-elected in 2014 with 87% of the vote. The district had a PVI of D+42.

=== Democratic primary ===
Incumbent Charles Rangel had spent the past two election cycles narrowly beating back challenges from prominent state senator Adriano Espaillat, who had attacked Rangel over ignoring Latino areas of the 13th and for being censured for ethical violations by the House. These races had been marked by ethnic divides, with Espaillat mobilizing Dominican-American voters in Uptown whereas Rangel won the support of African-American and Puerto Rican voters in Harlem and Spanish Harlem.

Rangel had said during the 2014 election, and confirmed after his victory, that he would not run for a 24th term in 2016. However, he declared he would be "involved" in picking his successor.

Former state assemblyman, former city councilman and candidate for the seat in 1996 and 2010 Adam Clayton Powell IV, the son of former U.S. Representative Adam Clayton Powell Jr., whom Rangel unseated in the primary in 1970, ran for the seat. State Assemblyman Keith L. T. Wright also ran for the seat.

==== Candidates ====
===== Nominee =====
- Adriano Espaillat, state senator and candidate for the seat in 2012 and 2014

===== Eliminated in primary =====
- Suzan Johnson Cook, pastor, former White House advisor, and former United States Ambassador-at-Large for International Religious Freedom
- Mike Gallagher, graphic artist
- Guillermo Linares, state assembly member
- Adam Clayton Powell IV, former state assembly member, candidate for the seat in 1994 and 2010, and son of former U.S. Representative Adam Clayton Powell Jr.
- Sam Sloan, perennial candidate
- Clyde Williams, former Democratic National Committee political director and candidate for the seat in 2012
- Keith L. T. Wright, state assembly member and former chair of the New York State Democratic Committee

===== Withdrawn =====
- Bill Perkins, state senator

===== Declined =====
- Inez Dickens, New York City Council member
- Melissa Mark-Viverito, New York City Council Speaker
- David Paterson, chairman of the New York State Democratic Committee and former Governor of New York
- Charles Rangel, incumbent U.S. representative
- Robert J. Rodriguez, state assembly member
- Michael Walrond, pastor and candidate for the seat in 2014

==== Endorsements ====
Adriano Espaillat

State officials

- Victor Pichardo, state assemblyman
- Bill Perkins, state senator
- Gustavo Rivera, state senator
- Andrea Stewart-Cousins, state senator

Local officials

- Mark Levine, NYC Councilor
- Melissa Mark-Viverito, Speaker of the New York City Council
- Ydanis Rodriguez, NYC Councilor
- Ritchie Torres, NYC Councilor

Labor unions

- Transport Workers' Union of America Local 100
Bill Perkins (withdrawn)

Individuals

- Korey Wise, activist and member of the Central Park Five
Clyde Williams

Executive officials

- Peter Rouse, former White House Chief of Staff
- Kathleen Sebelius, former U.S. Secretary of Health and Human Services

Federal officials

- Tom Daschle, former U.S. Senator for South Dakota

Newspapers & magazines

- The New York Times
Keith Wright

Federal officials

- Kirsten Gillibrand, U.S. Senator for New York
- Charles Rangel, incumbent U.S. Representative for NY-13

Statewide officials

- David A. Paterson, former Governor of New York

State officials

- Carl Heastie, Speaker of the New York State Assembly

Local officials

- Rubén Díaz, Jr., Bronx Borough President
- Inez Dickens, NYC Councilor
- David Dinkins, former mayor of New York City
- Robert Jackson, former NYC Councilor

Party officials

- Charlie King, former Chair of the New York State Democratic Executive Committee

Individuals

- Héctor Figueroa, trade unionist and President of the SEIU 32BJ
- Yusef Salaam, activist, motivational speaker and member of the Central Park Five
- Al Sharpton, Baptist minister, activist and candidate for President of the United States in 2004

Newspapers & magazines

- City & State
- The New York Observer

Labor unions

- SEIU 32BJ
- United Federation of Teachers

==== Results ====
2016 Democratic primary results by precinct Espaillat: 20–30%; 30–40%; 40–50%; 50–60%; 60–70%; 70–80%; 80–90%; Wright: 20–30%; 30–40%; 40–50%; 50–60%; 60–70%; 70–80%; 80–90%; Williams: 20–30%; 30–40%; 40–50%; Powell: 30–40%; Tie: 20–30%; 30–40%; No votes Interactive map version

Democratic primary results
Party	Candidate	Votes	%
Democratic	Adriano Espaillat	16,377	36.0
Democratic	Keith L. T. Wright	15,528	34.1
Democratic	Clyde E. Williams	5,003	11.0
Democratic	Adam Clayton Powell	2,986	6.6
Democratic	Guillermo Linares	2,504	5.5
Democratic	Suzan D. Johnson-Cook	2,341	5.1
Democratic	Michael Gallagher	435	1.0
Democratic	Sam Sloan	227	0.5
Democratic	Yohanny M. Caceres	116	0.2
Total votes		45,517	100.0

=== Republican primary ===
==== Candidates ====
===== Nominee =====
- Robert Evans, Jr., attorney

=== General election ===
==== Endorsements ====
Adriano Espaillat (D)

Labor unions

- New York State United Teachers

==== Predictions ====
Source	Ranking	As of
The Cook Political Report	Safe D	November 7, 2016
Daily Kos Elections	Safe D	November 7, 2016
Rothenberg	Safe D	November 3, 2016
Sabato's Crystal Ball	Safe D	November 7, 2016
RCP	Safe D	October 31, 2016

==== Results ====
New York's 13th congressional district, 2016
Party	Candidate	Votes	%
Democratic	Adriano Espaillat	207,194	88.8
Republican	Robert A. Evans, Jr.	13,129	5.6
Independence	Robert A. Evans, Jr.	2,960	1.3
Total	Robert A. Evans, Jr.	16,089	6.9
Green	Daniel Vila Rivera	8,248	3.5
Transparent Government	Scott L. Fenstermaker	1,877	0.8
Total votes		233,408	100.0
Democratic hold			

== District 14 ==
2016 New York's 14th congressional district election
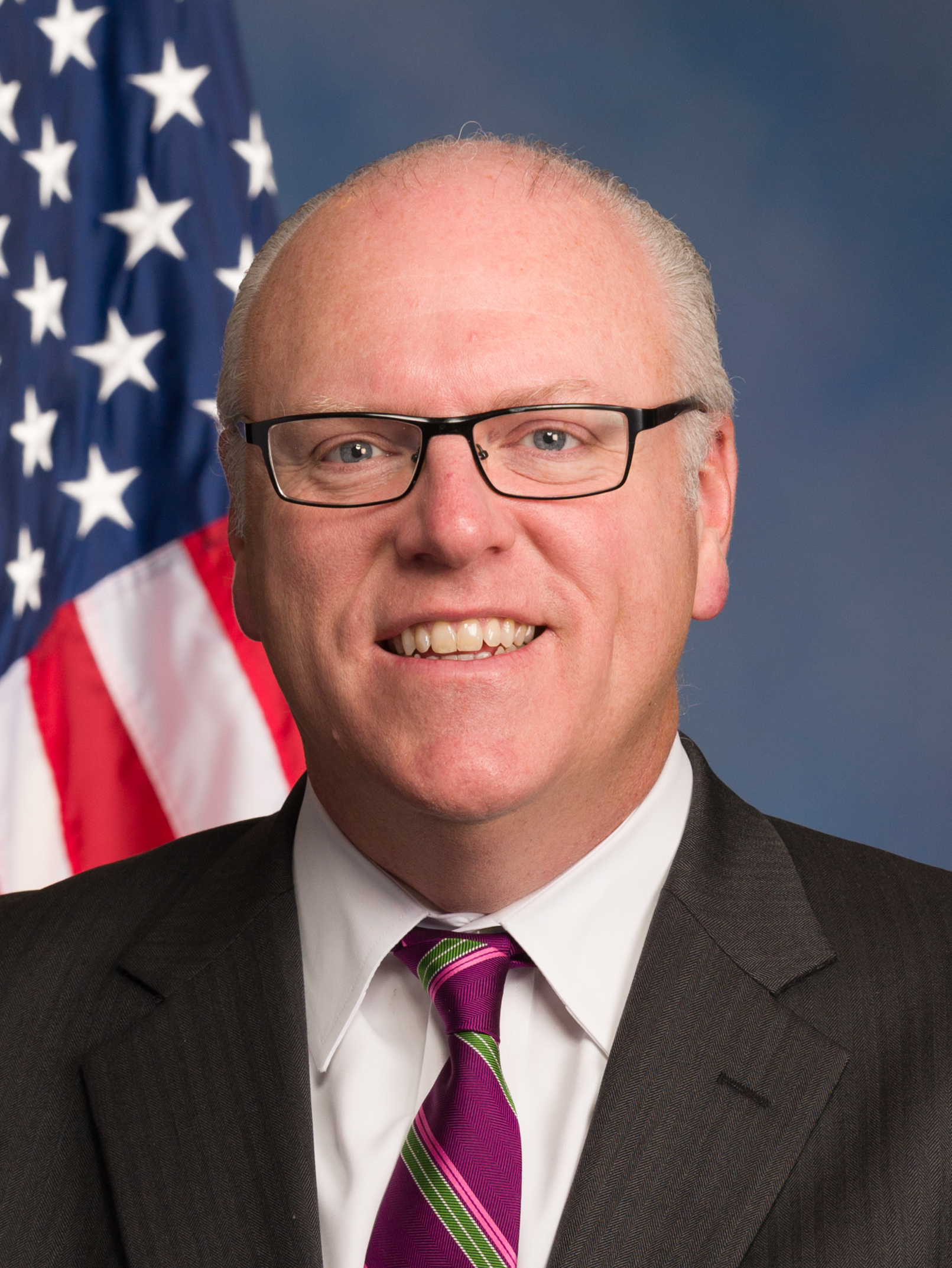

	Majority party	Minority party
Candidate	Joseph Crowley	Frank J. Spotorno
Party	Democratic	Republican
Alliance	Working Families; Women's Equality	Conservative
Popular vote	147,587	30,545
Percentage	82.9%	17.1%
- County results Crowley: 80–90%
U.S. Representative before election
Joseph Crowley
Democratic
Elected U.S. Representative
Joseph Crowley
Democratic

The 14th district is located in New York City and includes the eastern Bronx and part of north-central Queens. Incumbent Democrat, Joseph Crowley, who had represented the district since 2013, and previously represented the 7th district from 1999 to 2013, ran for re-election. He was re-elected in 2014 with 88% of the vote. The district had a PVI of D+26.

=== Democratic primary ===
==== Candidates ====
===== Nominee =====
- Joseph Crowley, incumbent U.S. representative

=== Republican primary ===
==== Candidates ====
===== Nominee =====
- Frank Spotorno, small businessman

=== General election ===
==== Endorsements ====
Joseph Crowley (D)

Labor unions

- New York State United Teachers

==== Predictions ====
Source	Ranking	As of
The Cook Political Report	Safe D	November 7, 2016
Daily Kos Elections	Safe D	November 7, 2016
Rothenberg	Safe D	November 3, 2016
Sabato's Crystal Ball	Safe D	November 7, 2016
RCP	Safe D	October 31, 2016

==== Results ====
Crowley won re-election, attaining 77.7% of the vote. This would prove to be Crowley's final victory in an election for Congress. In June 2018, Crowley was upset by the unknown Alexandria Ocasio-Cortez in the Democratic primary.

New York's 14th congressional district, 2016
Party	Candidate	Votes	%
Democratic	Joseph Crowley	138,367	77.7
Working Families	Joseph Crowley	7,317	4.1
Women's Equality	Joseph Crowley	1,903	1.1
Total	Joseph Crowley (incumbent)	147,587	82.9
Republican	Frank J. Spotorno	26,891	15.1
Conservative	Frank J. Spotorno	3,654	2.0
Total	Frank J. Spotorno	30,545	17.1
Total votes		178,132	100.0
Democratic hold			

== District 15 ==
2016 New York's 15th congressional district election
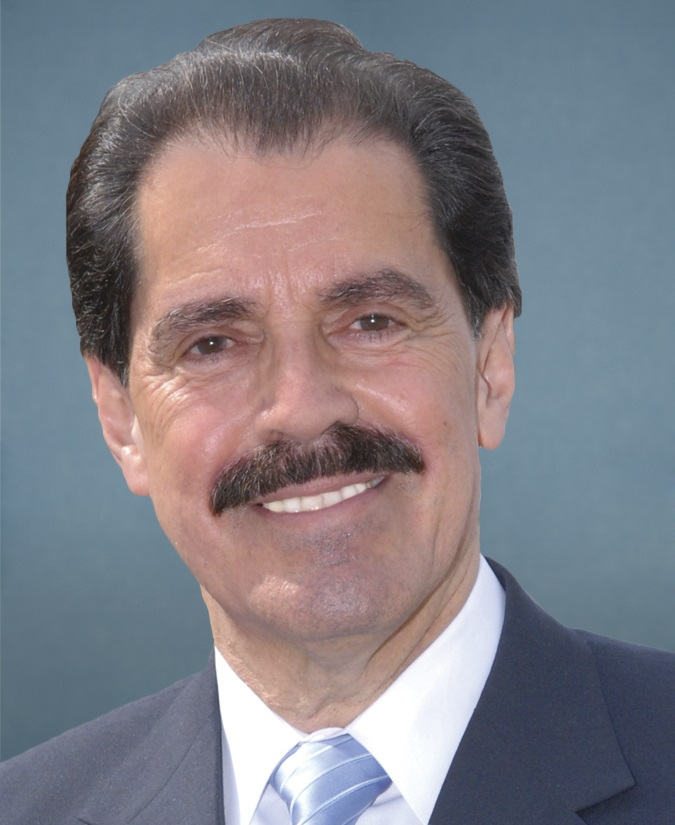
	Majority party
Candidate	José E. Serrano
Party	Democratic
Popular vote	165,688
Percentage	95.3%
- County results Serrano: >90%
U.S. Representative before election
José E. Serrano
Democratic
Elected U.S. Representative
José E. Serrano
Democratic

The 15th district is located entirely within The Bronx in New York City and is one of the smallest districts by area in the entire country. The incumbent was Democrat José E. Serrano, who had represented the district since 2013, and previously represented the 16th district from 1993 to 2013 and the 18th district from 1990 to 1993. He was re-elected with 90% of the vote in 2014. The district had a PVI of D+43.

=== Democratic primary ===
==== Candidates ====
===== Nominee =====
- José E. Serrano, incumbent U.S. representative

===== Eliminated in primary =====
- Leonel Baez

===== Declined =====
- Adolfo Carrión, Jr., former Bronx borough president, former director of the White House Office of Urban Affairs and Independence nominee for mayor in 2013

==== Results ====
Democratic primary results
Party	Candidate	Votes	%
Democratic	Jose E. Serrano (incumbent)	9,334	89.2
Democratic	Leonel Baez	1,127	10.8
Total votes		10,461	100.0

=== Republican primary ===
==== Candidates ====
===== Nominee =====
- Alejandro Vega

=== General election ===
==== Endorsements ====
Jose Serrano (D)

Labor unions

- New York State United Teachers

==== Predictions ====
Source	Ranking	As of
The Cook Political Report	Safe D	November 7, 2016
Daily Kos Elections	Safe D	November 7, 2016
Rothenberg	Safe D	November 3, 2016
Sabato's Crystal Ball	Safe D	November 7, 2016
RCP	Safe D	October 31, 2016

==== Results ====
New York's 15th congressional district, 2016
Party	Candidate	Votes	%
Democratic	Jose E. Serrano (incumbent)	165,688	95.3
Republican	Alejandro Vega	6,129	3.5
Conservative	Eduardo Ramirez	2,104	1.2
Total votes		173,921	100.0
Democratic hold			

== District 16 ==
2016 New York's 16th congressional district election
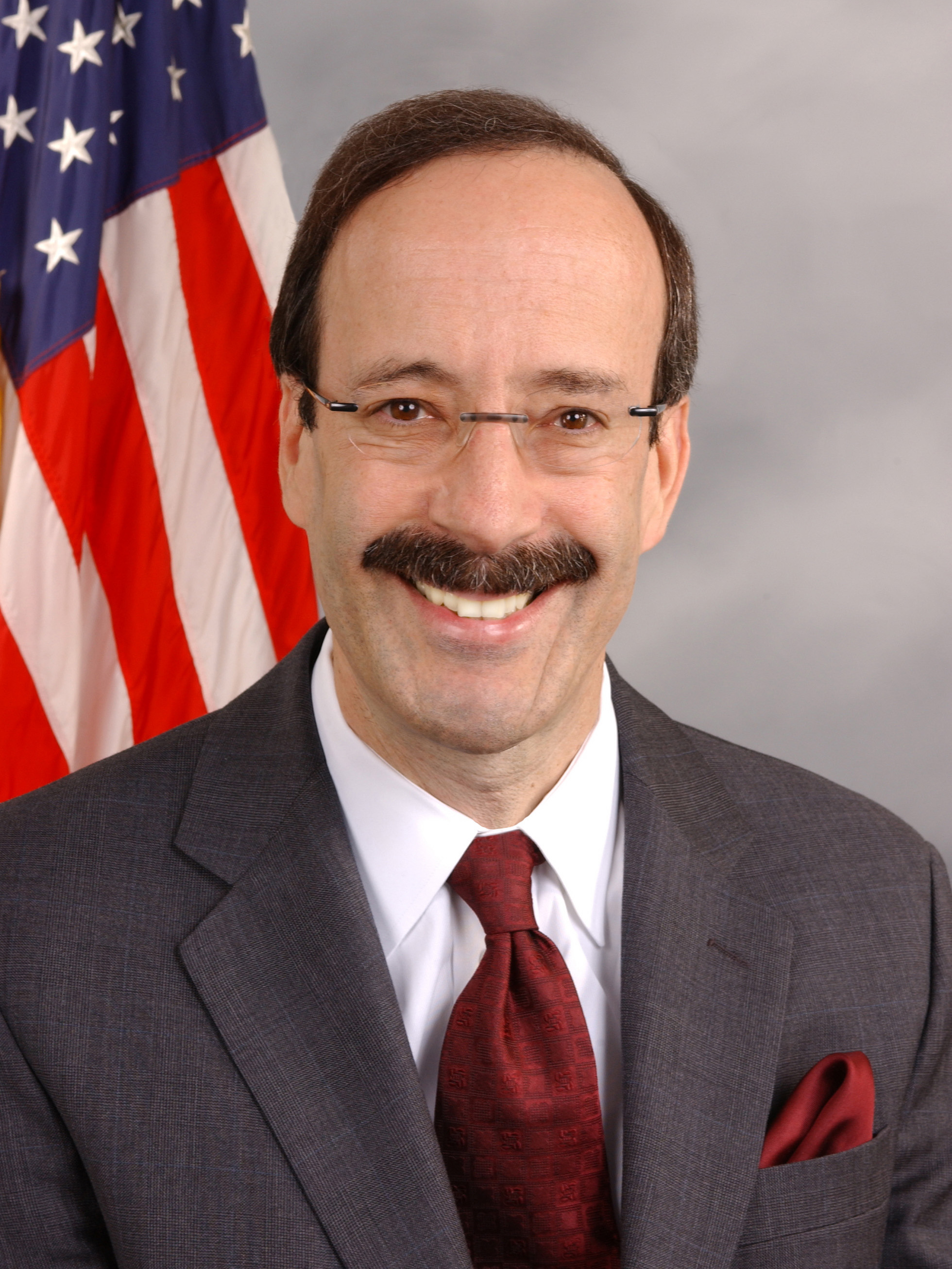

	Majority party	Minority party
Candidate	Eliot Engel	Derickson K. Lawrence
Party	Democratic	Independent
Alliance	Working Families; Women's Equality	People's Choice Congress
Popular vote	209,857	11,825
Percentage	94.7%	5.3%
- County results Engel: >90%
U.S. Representative before election
Eliot Engel
Democratic
Elected U.S. Representative
Eliot Engel
Democratic

The 16th district is located in the northern part of The Bronx and the southern half of Westchester County, including the cities of Mount Vernon, Yonkers and Rye. Incumbent Democrat Eliot Engel, who had represented the district since 2013, and previously represented the 17th district from 1993 to 2013 and the 19th district from 1989 to 1993, ran for re-election. He was re-elected in 2014 with 100% of the vote. The district had a PVI of D+21.

=== Democratic primary ===
==== Candidates ====
===== Nominee =====
- Eliot Engel, incumbent U.S. representative

=== Republican primary ===
No Republicans filed.

=== General election ===
Engel was challenged by Independent candidate Derickson K. Lawrence.

==== Endorsements ====
Eliot Engel (D)

Labor unions

- New York State United Teachers

==== Predictions ====
Source	Ranking	As of
The Cook Political Report	Safe D	November 7, 2016
Daily Kos Elections	Safe D	November 7, 2016
Rothenberg	Safe D	November 3, 2016
Sabato's Crystal Ball	Safe D	November 7, 2016
RCP	Safe D	October 31, 2016

==== Results ====
New York's 16th congressional district, 2016
Party	Candidate	Votes	%
Democratic	Eliot Engel	198,811	89.7
Working Families	Eliot Engel	8,518	3.8
Women's Equality	Eliot Engel	2,528	1.1
Total	Eliot Engel (incumbent)	209,857	94.7
People's Choice Congress	Derickson K. Lawrence	11,825	5.3
Total votes		221,682	100.0
Democratic hold			

== District 17 ==
2016 New York's 17th congressional district election
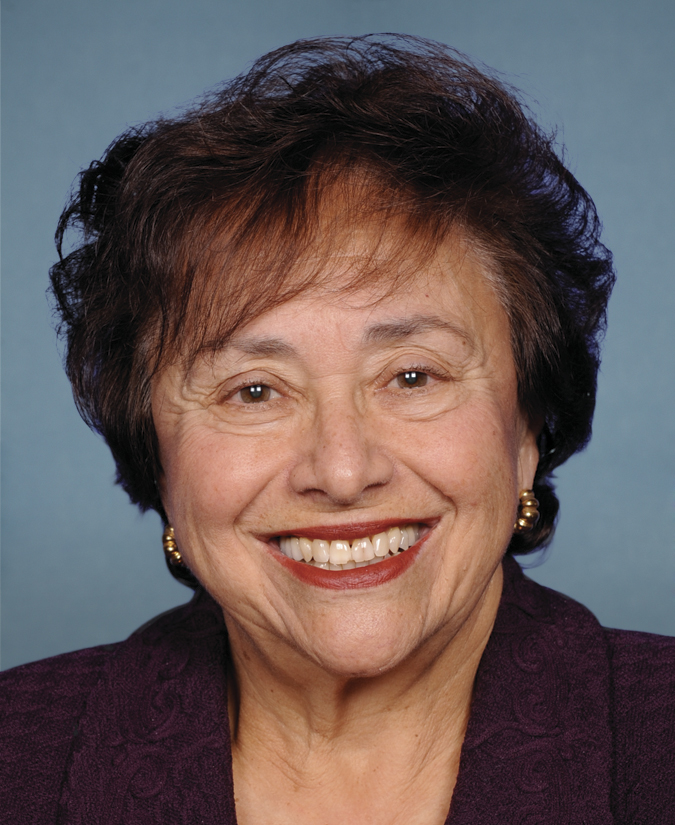
	Majority party
Candidate	Nita Lowey
Party	Democratic
Alliance	Working Families; Women's Equality
Popular vote	214,530
Percentage	100%
U.S. Representative before election
Nita Lowey
Democratic
Elected U.S. Representative
Nita Lowey
Democratic

The 17th district contains all of Rockland County and the northern and central portions of Westchester County, including the cities of Peekskill and White Plains. Incumbent Democrat Nita Lowey, who had represented the district since 2013, and previously represented the 18th district from 1993 to 2013 and the 20th district from 1989 to 1993, ran for re-election. She was re-elected in 2014 with 56% of the vote. The district had a PVI of D+5.

=== Democratic primary ===
==== Candidates ====
===== Nominee =====
- Nita Lowey, incumbent U.S. representative

=== Republican primary ===
No Republicans filed.

=== General election ===
==== Endorsements ====
Nita Lowey (D)

Labor unions

- New York State United Teachers

==== Predictions ====
Source	Ranking	As of
The Cook Political Report	Safe D	November 7, 2016
Daily Kos Elections	Safe D	November 7, 2016
Rothenberg	Safe D	November 3, 2016
Sabato's Crystal Ball	Safe D	November 7, 2016
RCP	Safe D	October 31, 2016

==== Results ====
New York's 17th congressional district, 2016
Party	Candidate	Votes	%
Democratic	Nita Lowey	193,819	90.4
Working Families	Nita Lowey	15,706	7.3
Women's Equality	Nita Lowey	5,005	2.3
Total	Nita Lowey (incumbent)	214,530	100.0
Total votes		214,530	100.0
Democratic hold			

== District 18 ==
2016 New York's 18th congressional district election
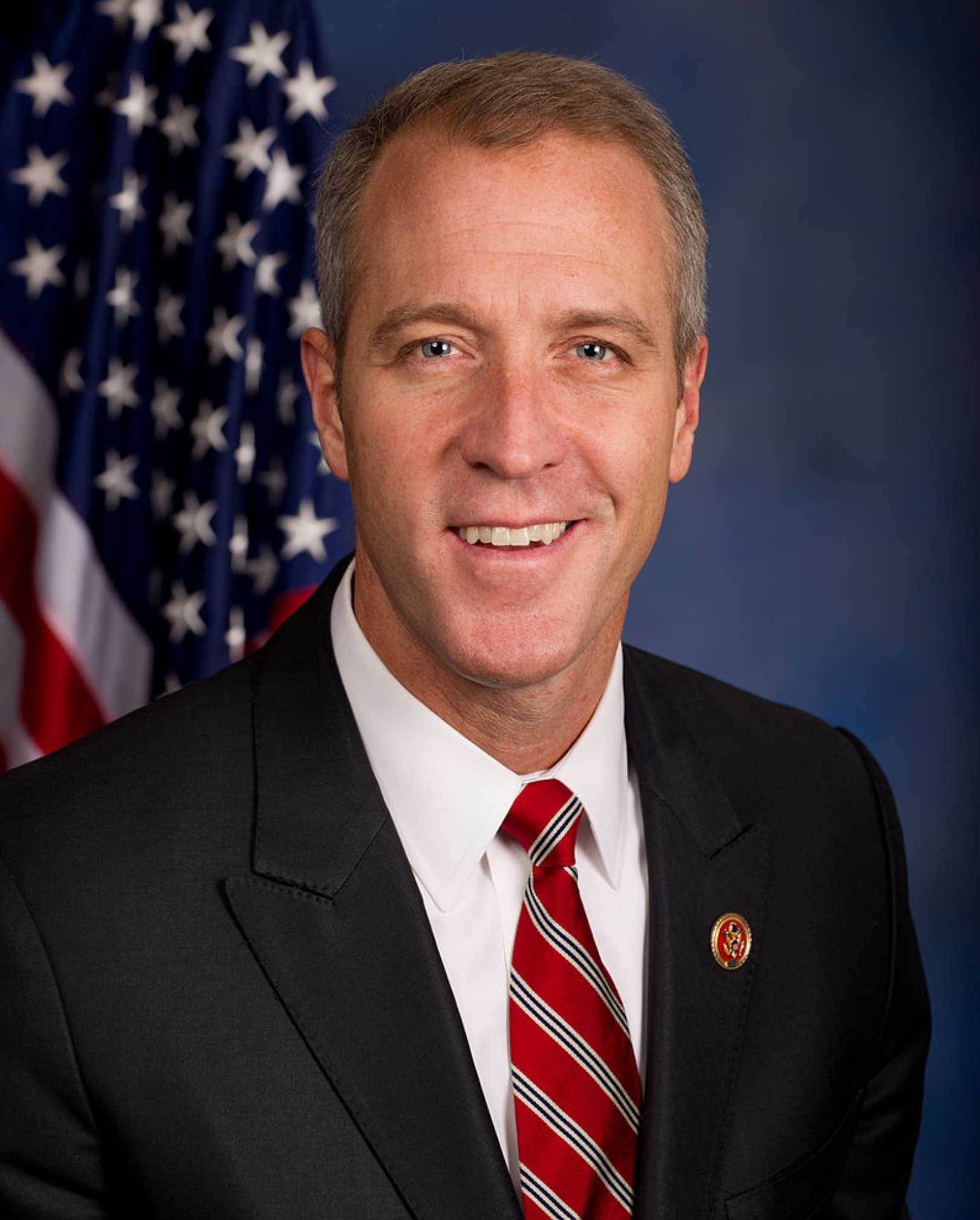

	Majority party	Minority party
Candidate	Sean Patrick Maloney	Phil Oliva
Party	Democratic	Republican
Alliance	Working Families; Women's Equality; Independence	Conservative; Reform
Popular vote	162,060	129,369
Percentage	55.6%	44.4%
- County results Maloney: 50–60% Olivia: 50–60%
U.S. Representative before election
Sean Patrick Maloney
Democratic
Elected U.S. Representative
Sean Patrick Maloney
Democratic

The 18th district is located entirely within the Hudson Valley, covering all of Orange County and Putnam County, as well as parts of southern Dutchess County and northeastern Westchester County. The incumbent was Democrat Sean Patrick Maloney. He was elected to the House in 2012 by a slim margin, defeating former Republican Rep. Nan Hayworth, and defeated her again in 2014 in a rematch by a slim margin. The district had an even PVI.

=== Democratic primary ===
==== Candidates ====
===== Nominee =====
- Sean Patrick Maloney, incumbent U.S. representative

===== Withdrew =====
- Diana Hird, attorney

=== Republican primary ===
==== Candidates ====
===== Nominee =====
- Phil Oliva Jr., senior advisor to Westchester County Executive Rob Astorino

===== Eliminated in primary =====
- Ken Del Vecchio, filmmaker

===== Withdrew =====
- Sakima Brown, former Poughkeepsie school board member, Iraq War veteran, and nominee for State Assembly in 2014
- Dan Castricone, former Orange County legislator and 2014 State Assembly candidate
- John Lange, former state legislative aide
- Frank Spaminato

==== Endorsements ====
Phil Oliva

U.S. representatives

- Nan Hayworth, former U.S. representative
- Sue W. Kelly, former U.S. representative

Local officials

- Rob Astorino, Westchester County executive

==== Results ====
Republican primary results
Party	Candidate	Votes	%
Republican	Phil Oliva	3,574	57.0
Republican	Kenneth Del Vecchio	2,696	43.0
Total votes		6,270	100.0

=== General election ===
==== Endorsements ====
Sean Patrick Maloney (D)

Labor unions

- New York State United Teachers

Organizations

- Democratic Congressional Campaign Committee "Frontline" Program
Phil Oliva (R)

U.S. representatives

- Nan Hayworth, former U.S. representative
- Sue W. Kelly, former U.S. representative

Local officials

- Rob Astorino, Westchester County executive

==== Predictions ====
Source	Ranking	As of
The Cook Political Report	Safe D	November 7, 2016
Daily Kos Elections	Safe D	November 7, 2016
Rothenberg	Safe D	November 3, 2016
Sabato's Crystal Ball	Safe D	November 7, 2016
RCP	Safe D	October 31, 2016

==== Results ====
New York's 18th congressional district, 2016
Party	Candidate	Votes	%
Democratic	Sean Patrick Maloney	140,951	48.4
Independence	Sean Patrick Maloney	10,356	3.5
Working Families	Sean Patrick Maloney	8,771	3.0
Women's Equality	Sean Patrick Maloney	1,982	0.7
Total	Sean Patrick Maloney (incumbent)	162,060	55.6
Republican	Phil Oliva	111,117	38.1
Conservative	Phil Oliva	16,968	5.8
Reform	Phil Oliva	1,284	0.5
Total	Phil Oliva	129,369	44.4
Total votes		291,429	100.0
Democratic hold			

== District 19 ==
2016 New York's 19th congressional district election
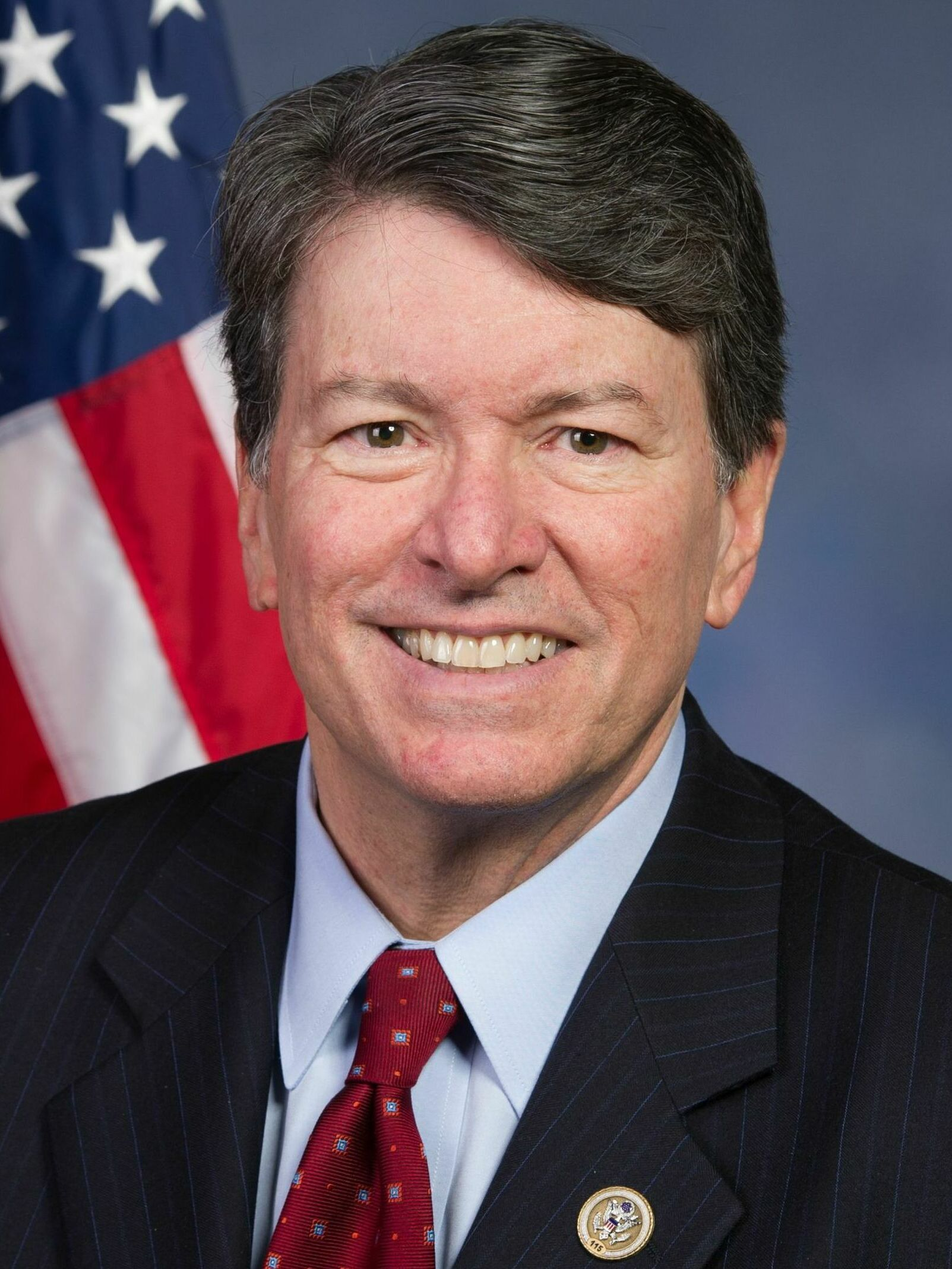

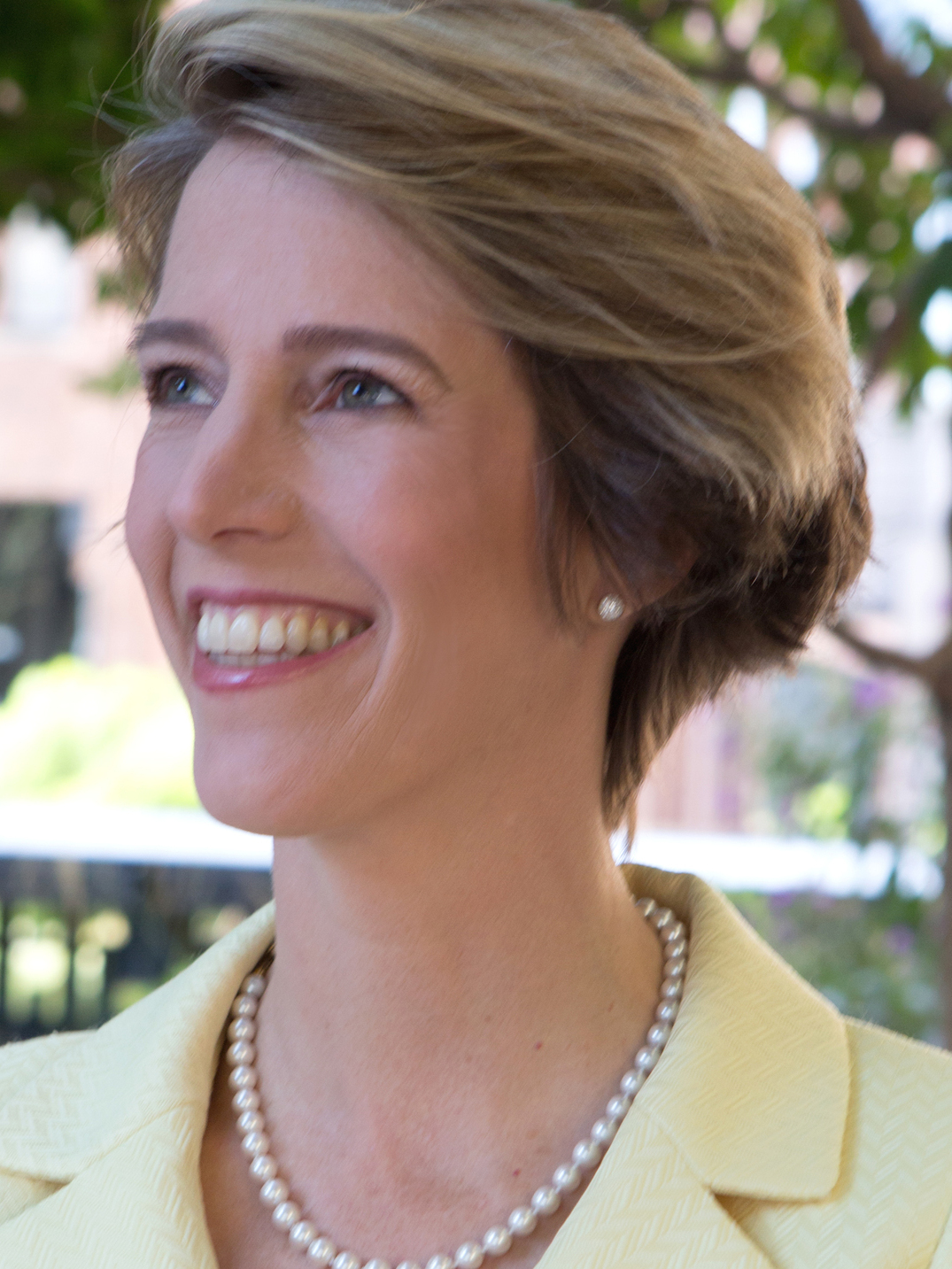
Nominee	John Faso	Zephyr Teachout
Party	Republican	Democratic
Alliance	Conservative; Reform; Independence	Working Families
Popular vote	164,800	138,800
Percentage	54.3%	45.7%
- County results Faso: 50–60% 60–70% 70–80% Teachout: 50–60%
U.S. Representative before election
Chris Gibson
Republican
Elected U.S. Representative
John Faso
Republican

The 19th district is located in New York's Hudson Valley and Catskills regions and includes all of Columbia, Delaware, Greene, Otsego, Schoharie, Sullivan and Ulster counties, and parts of Broome, Dutchess, Montgomery and Rensselaer counties. The incumbent was Republican Chris Gibson, who had represented the district since 2013, and previously represented the 20th district from 2011 to 2013. He was re-elected in 2014 with 63% of the vote. The district had a PVI of D+1.

=== Republican primary ===
Gibson, a supporter of term limits, had pledged to limit himself to four terms in office but opted to retire at the end of his third.

==== Candidates ====
===== Nominee =====
- John Faso, former state assembly member and nominee for governor in 2006

===== Eliminated in primary =====
- Andrew Heaney, heating oil executive

===== Withdrawn =====
- Pete Lopez, state assembly member

===== Declined =====
- Chris Gibson, incumbent U.S. representative
- Kathleen M. Jimino, Rensselaer County executive
- Ryan McAllister, former Cobleskill Town Council member .
- Steven McLaughlin, state assembly member
- Marcus Molinaro, Dutchess County executive
- James L. Seward, state senator

==== Endorsements ====
John Faso

U.S. representatives

- Elise Stefanik, U.S. representative
- Lee Zeldin, U.S. representative

State legislators

- John Bonacic, state senator
- Steven McLaughlin, state assembly member
- James L. Seward, state senator

Organizations

- National Association of Realtors
- NRA Political Victory Fund

Individuals

- Lawrence Kudlow, economist and newspaper columnist
Andrew Heaney

State legislators

- Kieran Lalor, state assembly member

===== Polling =====
Poll source	Date(s) administered	Sample size	Margin of error	John Faso	Andrew Heaney	Undecided
Siena College	June 19–22, 2016	494	± 4.4%	58%	28%	14%
Siena College	May 31 – June 2, 2016	436	± 4.8%	50%	28%	21%
McLaughlin & Associates (R-Faso)	May 31 – June 1, 2016	300	± 5.6%	51%	32%	17%

==== Predictions ====
Source	Ranking	As of
The Cook Political Report	Tossup	November 7, 2016
Daily Kos Elections	Tossup	November 7, 2016
Rothenberg	Tossup	November 3, 2016
Sabato's Crystal Ball	Lean R	November 7, 2016
RCP	Tossup	October 31, 2016

==== Results ====
Republican primary results
Party	Candidate	Votes	%
Republican	John J. Faso	10,922	67.5
Republican	Andrew Heaney	5,253	32.5
Total votes		16,175	100.0

=== Democratic primary ===
Only Will Yandik and Zephyr Teachout filed papers with the New York State Board of Elections as, although John Keho had filed with the Federal Elections Commission, he did not with the New York State Board of Elections.

==== Candidates ====
===== Nominee =====
- Zephyr Teachout, professor and candidate for governor in 2014

===== Eliminated in primary =====
- Will Yandik, Deputy Livingston town supervisor

===== Withdrawn =====
- John Patrick Kehoe, music agency CEO and management consultant

===== Declined =====
- Didi Barrett, state assembly member
- Kevin Cahill, state assembly member
- Sean Eldridge, investor and nominee for this seat in 2014
- Patricia Fahy, state assembly member
- Terry Gipson, former state senator
- Aileen Gunther, state assembly member
- John Hall, former U.S. representative
- Michael P. Hein, Ulster County executive
- Julian Schreibman, prosecutor and nominee for this seat in 2012
- Frank Skartados, state assembly member
- Joel Tyner, Dutchess County legislator and candidate for this seat in 2012
- Joanne Yepsen, mayor of Saratoga Springs

==== Endorsements ====
Zephyr Teachout

U.S. senators

- Kirsten Gillibrand, New York
- Bernie Sanders, Vermont
- Chuck Schumer, New York

U.S. representatives

- Keith Ellison, Minnesota

Organizations

- Congressional Progressive Caucus
- EMILY's List

===== Polling =====
Poll source	Date(s) administered	Sample size	Margin of error	Zephyr Teachout	Will Yandik	Undecided
Siena College	June 19–22, 2016	598	± 4.0%	62%	23%	15%
Siena College	May 31 – June 2, 2016	431	± 4.7%	53%	23%	24%

==== Results ====
In the June 28, 2016 primary, Teachout won the Democratic nomination handily. by a 71.11% to 28.65% margin.

Democratic primary results
Party	Candidate	Votes	%
Democratic	Zephyr Teachout	13,801	71.3
Democratic	Will Yandik	5,561	28.7
Total votes		19,362	100.0

Teachout was unopposed in filing for the Working Families Party nomination.

=== General election ===
This was considered one of the most highly contested races in New York in 2016.

==== Endorsements ====
John Faso (R)

U.S. representatives

- Elise Stefanik, U.S. representative
- Lee Zeldin, U.S. representative

State legislators

- John Bonacic, state senator
- Steven McLaughlin, state assembly member
- James L. Seward, state senator

Organizations

- National Association of Realtors
- National Republican Congressional Committee "Young Guns" Program
- NRA Political Victory Fund

Individuals

- Lawrence Kudlow, economist and newspaper columnist
Zephyr Teachout (D)

U.S. senators

- Kirsten Gillibrand, New York
- Bernie Sanders, Vermont
- Chuck Schumer, New York

U.S. representatives

- Keith Ellison, Minnesota

Labor unions

- New York State United Teachers

Organizations

- Congressional Progressive Caucus
- Democratic Congressional Campaign Committee "Red to Blue" Program
- EMILY's List

==== Debates ====
- Complete video of debate, September 15, 2016
- Complete video of debate, October 13, 2016
- Complete video of debate, October 24, 2016

==== Polling ====
Poll source	Date(s) administered	Sample size	Margin of error	John Faso (R)	Zephyr Teachout (D)	Undecided
Siena College	November 1–3, 2016	605	± 4.0%	48%	42%	9%
SurveyUSA	September 27–30, 2016	598	± 4.1%	42%	45%	13%
Siena College	September 20–22, 2016	678	± 3.8%	43%	42%	15%
DCCC	September 13–14, 2016	532	± 4.2%	42%	47%	11%
McLaughlin & Associates (R-Faso)	August 8–10, 2016	400	± 4.9%	46%	41%	14%

==== Results ====
New York's 19th congressional district, 2016
Party	Candidate	Votes	%
Republican	John Faso	134,825	44.4
Conservative	John Faso	21,156	7.0
Independence	John Faso	7,943	2.6
Reform	John Faso	876	0.3
Total	John Faso	164,800	54.3
Democratic	Zephyr Teachout	123,733	40.7
Working Families	Zephyr Teachout	15,067	5.0
Total	Zephyr Teachout	138,800	45.7
Total votes		303,600	100.0
Republican hold			

== District 20 ==
2016 New York's 20th congressional district election
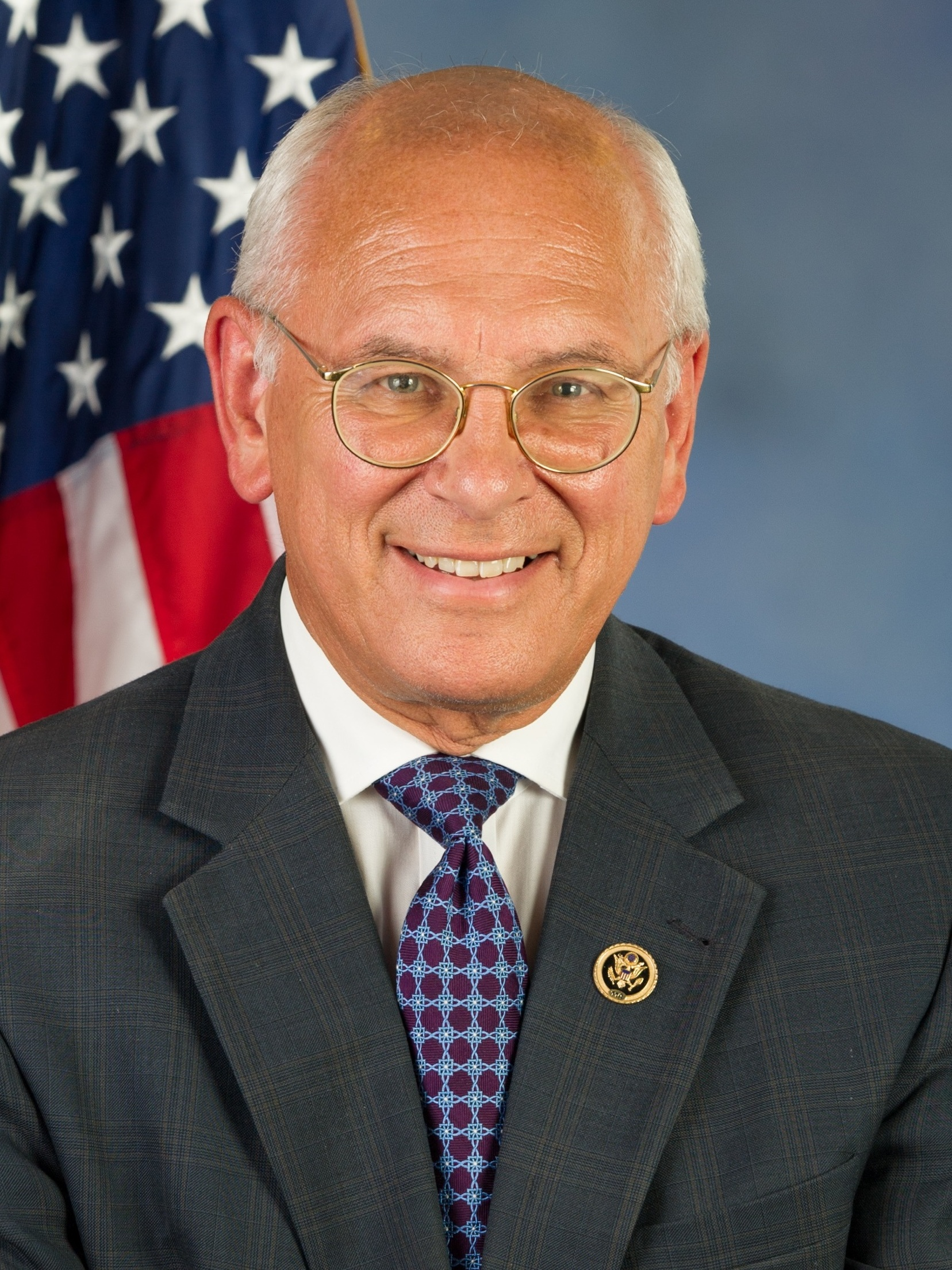

	Majority party	Minority party
Candidate	Paul Tonko	Joe Vitollo
Party	Democratic	Republican
Alliance	Working Families; Women's Equality; Independence	Conservative; Reform
Popular vote	213,021	100,738
Percentage	67.9%	32.1%
- County results Tonko: 60–70% 70–80%
U.S. Representative before election
Paul Tonko
Democratic
Elected U.S. Representative
Paul Tonko
Democratic

The 20th district is located in the Capital District and includes all of Albany and Schenectady counties, and portions of Montgomery, Rensselear and Saratoga counties. Incumbent Democrat Paul Tonko, who had represented the district since 2013, and previously represented the 21st district from 2009 to 2013, ran for re-election. He was re-elected in 2014 with 61% of the vote. The district had a PVI of D+7.

=== Democratic primary ===
==== Candidates ====
===== Nominee =====
- Paul Tonko, incumbent U.S. representative

=== Republican primary ===
==== Candidates ====
===== Nominee =====
- Joe Vitollo, businessman

=== General election ===
==== Endorsements ====
Paul Tonko (D)

Labor unions

- New York State United Teachers

==== Predictions ====
Source	Ranking	As of
The Cook Political Report	Safe D	November 7, 2016
Daily Kos Elections	Safe D	November 7, 2016
Rothenberg	Safe D	November 3, 2016
Sabato's Crystal Ball	Safe D	November 7, 2016
RCP	Safe D	October 31, 2016

==== Results ====
New York's 20th congressional district, 2016
Party	Candidate	Votes	%
Democratic	Paul Tonko	188,428	60.0
Working Families	Paul Tonko	10,935	3.5
Independence	Paul Tonko	10,622	3.4
Women's Equality	Paul Tonko	3,036	1.0
Total	Paul Tonko (incumbent)	213,021	67.9
Republican	Joe Vitollo	83,328	26.5
Conservative	Joe Vitollo	15,902	5.1
Reform	Joe Vitollo	1,508	0.5
Total	Joe Vitollo	100,738	32.1
Total votes		313,759	100.0
Democratic hold			

== District 21 ==
2016 New York's 21st congressional district election
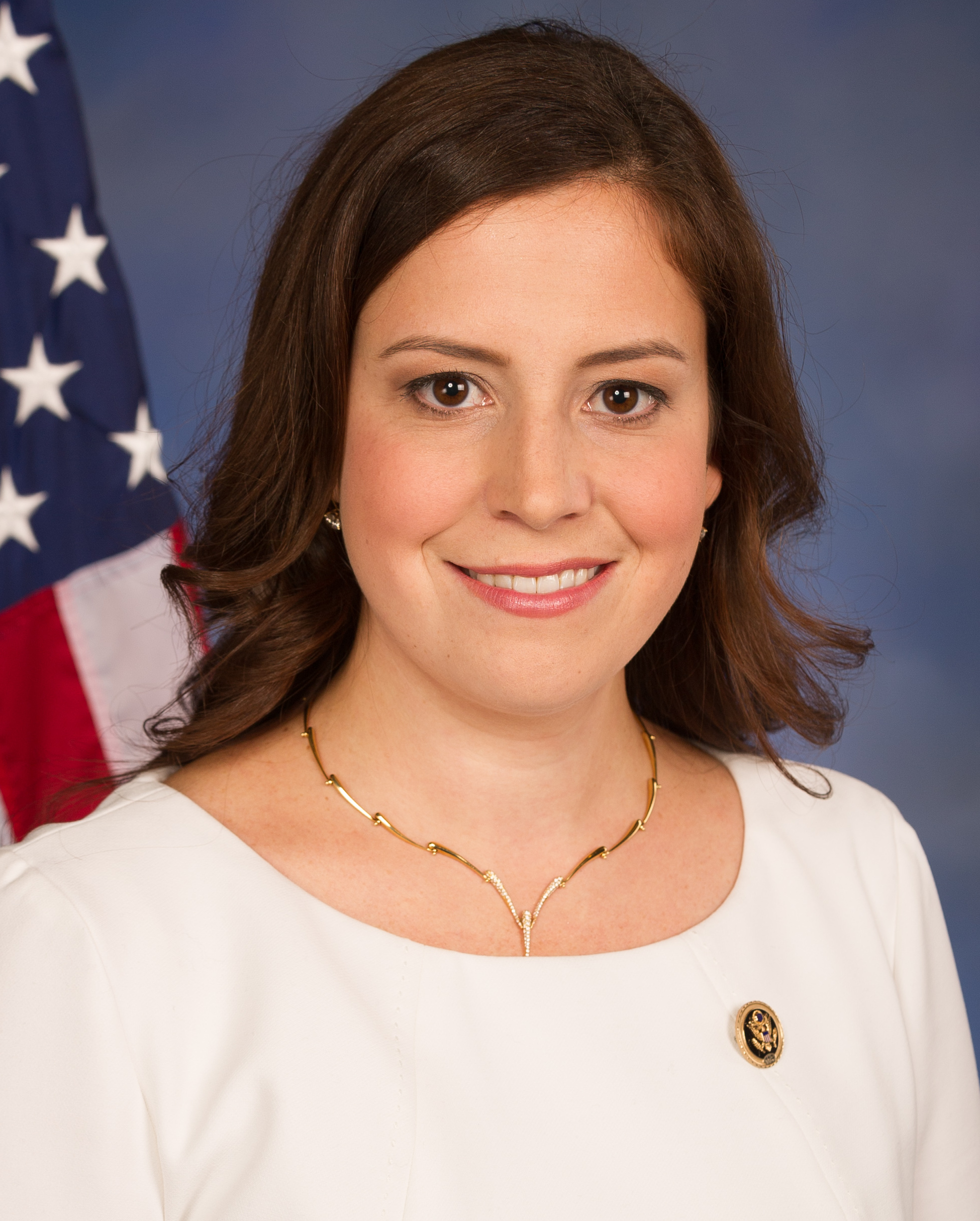

	Majority party	Minority party
Candidate	Elise Stefanik	Mike Derrick
Party	Republican	Democratic
Alliance	Conservative; Reform; Independence	Working Families
Popular vote	177,886	82,161
Percentage	65.3%	30.1%
- County results Stefanik: 50–60% 60–70% 70–80%
U.S. Representative before election
Elise Stefanik
Republican
Elected U.S. Representative
Elise Stefanik
Republican

The 21st district, the state's largest and most rural, includes most of the North Country, as well as the northern suburbs of Syracuse and borders Vermont to the east. The incumbent was Republican Elise Stefanik, who had represented the district since 2015. She was elected in 2014 with 55.1% of the vote. The district had an even PVI.

=== Republican primary ===
==== Candidates ====
===== Nominee =====
- Elise Stefanik, incumbent U.S. representative

=== Democratic primary ===
==== Candidates ====
===== Nominee =====
- Mike Derrick, retired Army colonel

===== Declined =====
- Aaron Woolf, grocery store owner, filmmaker and nominee for this seat in 2014

=== Green primary ===
==== Candidates ====
===== Nominee =====
- Matt Funiciello, bakery owner, political activist and nominee for this seat in 2014

=== General election ===
==== Debate ====
2016 New York's 21st congressional district debate
No.	Date	Host	Moderator	Link	Republican	Democratic	Green
Key: P Participant A Absent N Not invited I Invited W Withdrawn							
Key: P Participant A Absent N Not invited I Invited W Withdrawn					Elise Stefanik	Mike Derrick	Matthew J. Funiciello
1	Jun. 7, 2016	North Country Public Radio; WCFE-TV; WMHT-TV; WPBS-TV	Thom Hallock		P	P	P

==== Endorsements ====
Elise Stefanik (R)

Labor unions

- New York State United Teachers

Organizations

- National Republican Congressional Committee "Patriot" Program
Mike Derrick (D)

Organizations

- Democratic Congressional Campaign Committee "Red to Blue" Program

==== Polling ====
Poll source	Date(s) administered	Sample size	Margin of error	Elise Stefanik (R)	Mike Derrick (D)	Matt Funiciello (G)	Undecided
American Viewpoint (R-NRCC)	October 12–13, 2015	400	± 4.9%	54%	29%	9%	8%
Harper Polling (R-NRCC)	September 12–16, 2015	464	± 4.6%	51%	17%	13%	19%

==== Predictions ====
Source	Ranking	As of
The Cook Political Report	Likely R	November 7, 2016
Daily Kos Elections	Likely R	November 7, 2016
Rothenberg	Safe R	November 3, 2016
Sabato's Crystal Ball	Likely R	November 7, 2016
RCP	Likely R	October 31, 2016

==== Results ====
New York's 21st congressional district, 2016
Party	Candidate	Votes	%
Republican	Elise Stefanik	152,597	56.0
Conservative	Elise Stefanik	15,526	5.7
Independence	Elise Stefanik	8,799	3.3
Reform	Elise Stefanik	964	0.3
Total	Elise Stefanik (incumbent)	177,886	65.3
Democratic	Mike Derrick	75,965	27.9
Working Families	Mike Derrick	6,196	2.2
Total	Mike Derrick	82,161	30.1
Green	Matthew J. Funiciello	12,452	4.6
Total votes		272,606	100.0
Republican hold			

== District 22 ==
2016 New York's 22nd congressional district election
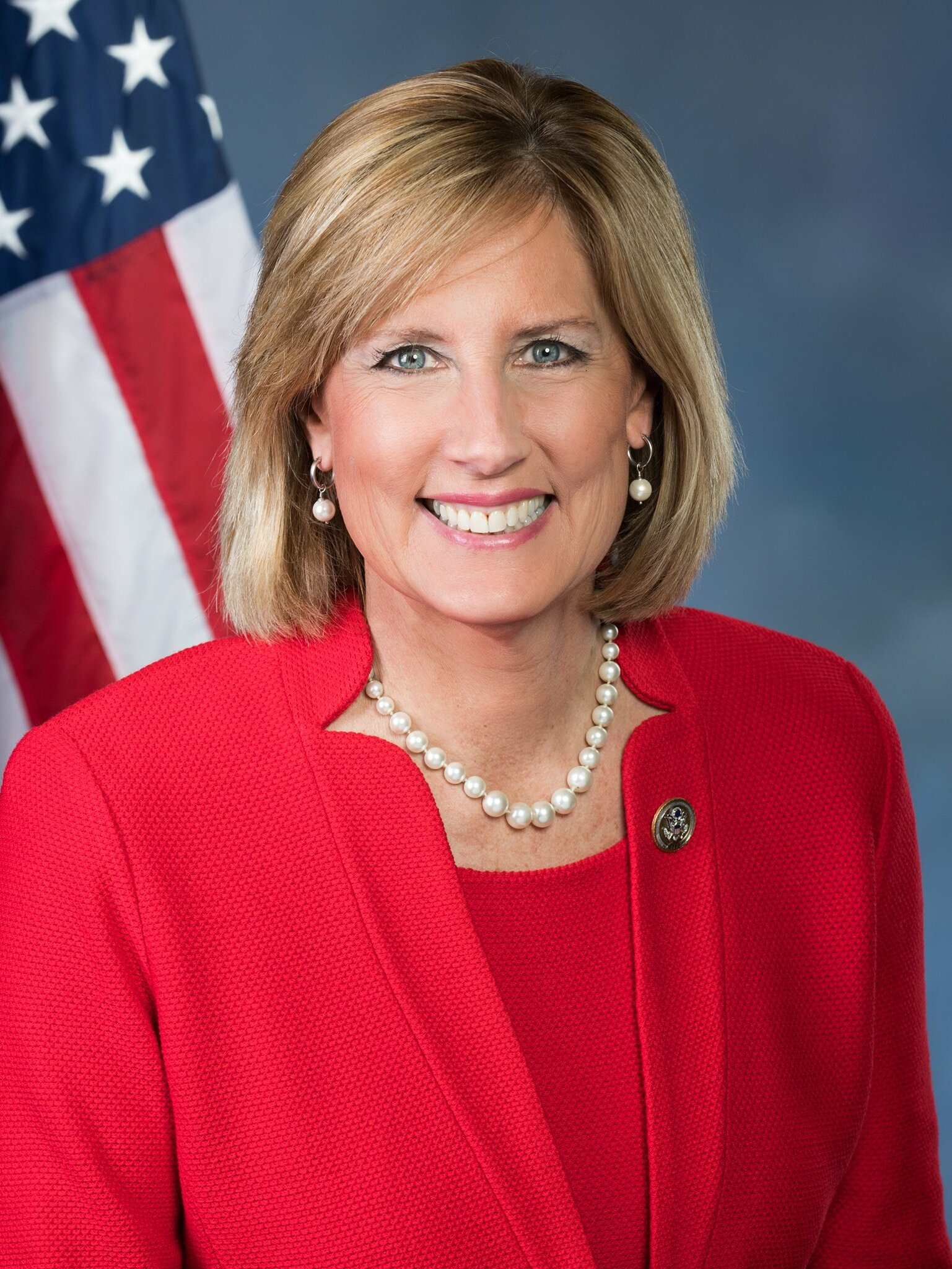

	Majority party	Minority party	Third party
Candidate	Claudia Tenney	Kim A. Myers	Martin Babinec
Party	Republican	Democratic	Reform
Alliance	Conservative	Working Families	Upstate Jobs
Popular vote	129,444	114,266	34,638
Percentage	46.5%	41.1%	12.4%
- County results Tenney: 40–50% 50–60% Myers: 40–50%
U.S. Representative before election
Richard L. Hanna
Republican
Elected U.S. Representative
Claudia Tenney
Republican

The 22nd district is located in Central New York and includes all of Chenango, Cortland, Madison and Oneida counties, and parts of Broome, Herkimer, Oswego and Tioga counties. The incumbent, Republican Richard Hanna, did not run for re-election.

=== Republican primary ===
==== Candidates ====
===== Nominee =====
- Claudia Tenney, state assembly member and candidate for this seat in 2014

===== Eliminated in primary =====
- George Phillips, high school history teacher and nominee for this seat in 2010
- Steve Wells, businessman

===== Withdrawn =====
- Aaron Price, filmmaker

===== Declined =====
- Michael Backus, Oswego County clerk
- Catherine Bertini, former executive director of the World Food Programme
- Joseph Griffo, state senator
- Richard Hanna, incumbent U.S. representative
- Raymond Meier, former state senator
- Anthony Picente, Oneida County executive

==== Endorsements ====
Claudia Tenney

Organizations

- NRA Political Victory Fund
Steve Wells

U.S. representatives

- Richard L. Hanna, incumbent U.S. representative

==== Polling ====
Poll source	Date(s) administered	Sample size	Margin of error	George Phillips	Claudia Tenney	Steve Wells	Undecided
Barry Zeplowitz & Associates	April 11–12, 2016	400	± 4.9%	13%	48%	9%	29%

==== Results ====
Republican primary results
Party	Candidate	Votes	%
Republican	Claudia Tenney	9,549	41.1
Republican	Steven M. Wells	7,985	34.3
Republican	George K. Phillips	5,716	24.6
Total votes		23,250	100.0

=== Democratic primary ===
==== Candidates ====
===== Nominee =====
- Kim A. Myers, Broome County legislator

===== Disqualified =====
- David Gordon, former Oneida County legislator

===== Declined =====
- Anthony Brindisi, state assembly member

=== General election ===
==== Debate ====
2016 New York's 22nd congressional district debate
No.	Date	Host	Moderator	Link	Republican	Democratic	Reform
Key: P Participant A Absent N Not invited I Invited W Withdrawn							
Key: P Participant A Absent N Not invited I Invited W Withdrawn					Claudia Tenney	Kim Myers	Martin Babinec
1	Nov. 3, 2016	Leagues of Women Voters of Broome & Tioga Counties; WSKG-TV	Crystal Sarakas		P	P	P

==== Campaign ====
Babinec stated he would caucus with the House Republicans if he was elected to Congress.

==== Endorsements ====
Claudia Tenney (R)

Organizations

- National Republican Congressional Committee "Young Guns" Program
- NRA Political Victory Fund
Kim Myers (D)

Organizations

- Democratic Congressional Campaign Committee "Red to Blue" Program
- EMILY's List
Martin Babinec (I)

Organizations

- United States Chamber of Commerce

==== Polling ====
Poll source	Date(s) administered	Sample size	Margin of error	Claudia Tenney (R)	Kim Myers (D)	Martin Babinec (I)	Undecided
Siena College	November 1–2, 2016	643	± 4.2%	38%	34%	16%	11%
Siena College	September 21–26, 2016	649	± 3.8%	35%	30%	24%	11%
Public Opinion Strategies (R)	August 23–25, 2016	400	± 4.9%	33%	27%	23%	17%
Anzalone Liszt Grove Research (D-DCCC)	August 14–16, 2016	400	± 4.9%	35%	35%	21%	9%

==== Predictions ====
Source	Ranking	As of
The Cook Political Report	Lean R	November 7, 2016
Daily Kos Elections	Tossup	November 7, 2016
Rothenberg	Tossup	November 3, 2016
Sabato's Crystal Ball	Lean R	November 7, 2016
RCP	Tossup	October 31, 2016

==== Results ====
New York's 22nd congressional district, 2016
Party	Candidate	Votes	%
Republican	Claudia Tenney	113,287	40.7
Conservative	Claudia Tenney	16,157	5.8
Total	Claudia Tenney	129,444	46.5
Democratic	Kim A. Myers	102,734	36.9
Working Families	Kim A. Myers	11,532	4.1
Total	Kim A. Myers	114,266	41.1
Reform	Martin Babinec	24,595	8.8
Upstate Jobs	Martin Babinec	10,043	3.6
Total	Martin Babinec	34,638	12.4
Total votes		278,348	100.0
Republican hold			

== District 23 ==
2016 New York's 23rd congressional district election
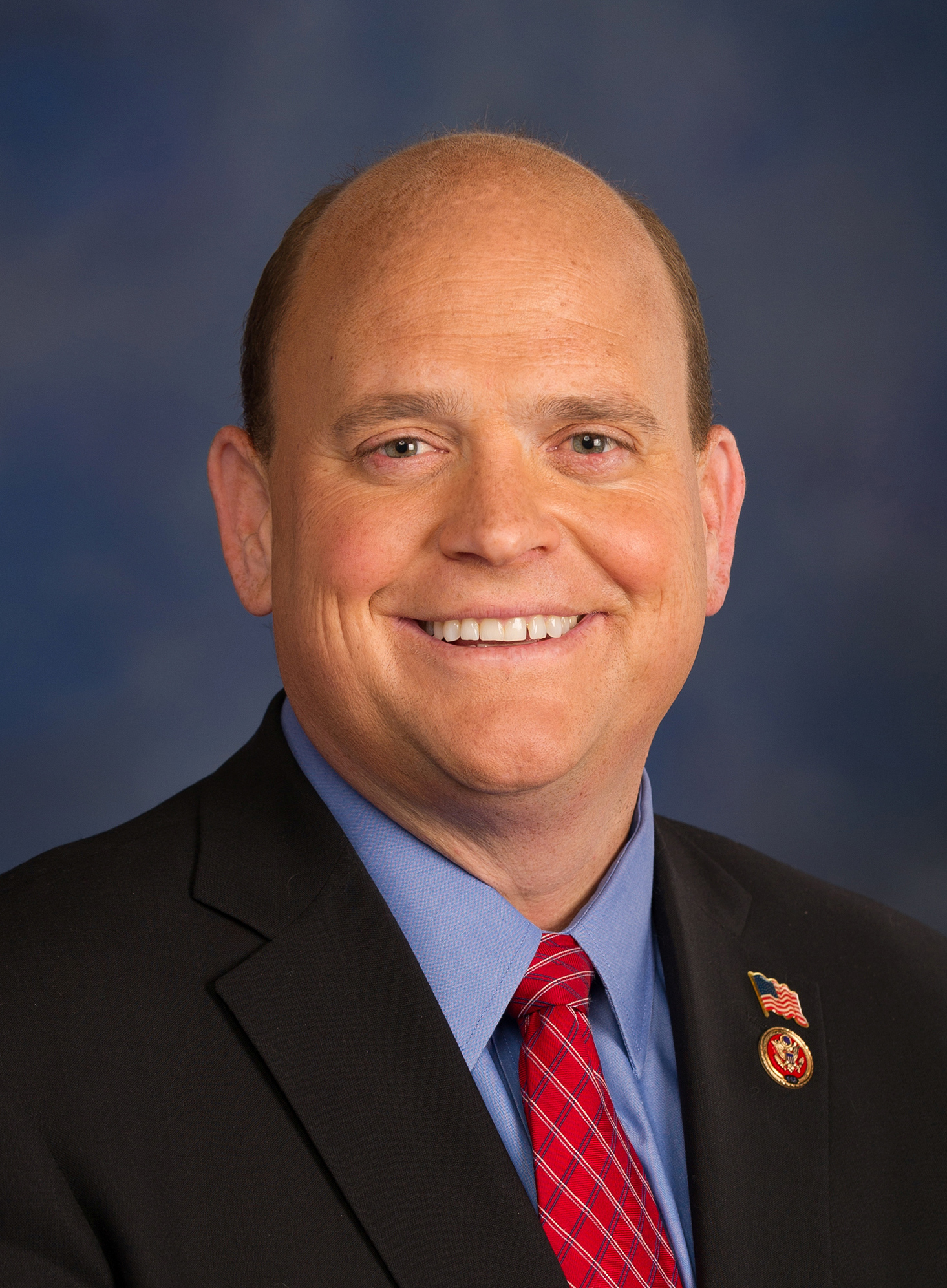

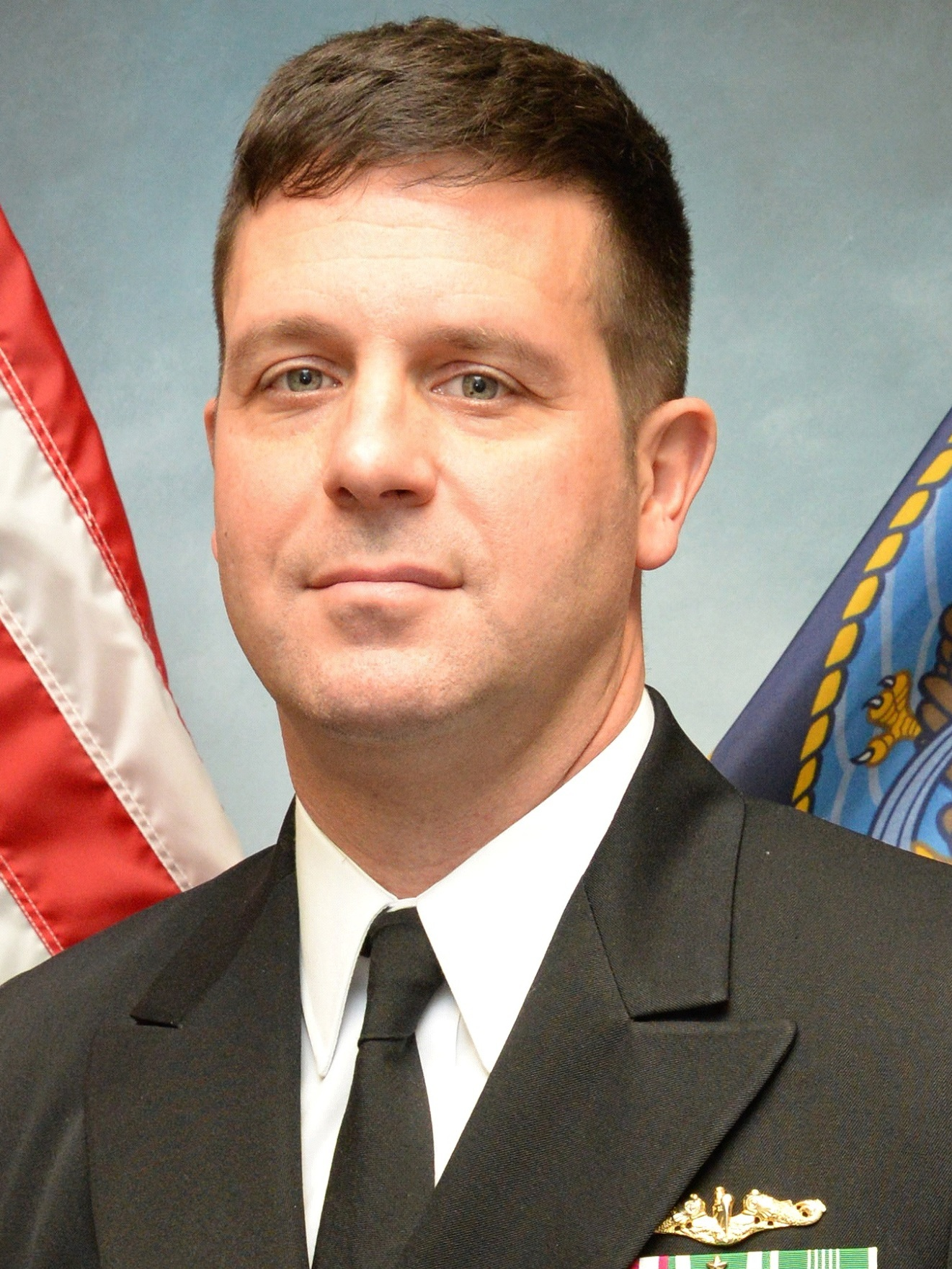
	Majority party	Minority party
Candidate	Tom Reed	John F. Plumb
Party	Republican	Democratic
Alliance	Conservative; Reform; Independence	Working Families
Popular vote	161,050	118,584
Percentage	57.6%	42.4%
- County results Reed: 50–60% 60–70% 70–80% Plumb: 70–80%
U.S. Representative before election
Tom Reed
Republican
Elected U.S. Representative
Tom Reed
Republican

The 23rd district includes all of Allegany, Cattaraugus, Chautauqua, Chemung, Schuyler, Seneca, Steuben, Tompkins and Yates counties, along with parts of Ontario and Tioga counties.

The incumbent was Republican Tom Reed, who had represented the district since 2013, and previously represented the 29th district from 2009 to 2013. He was re-elected in 2014 with 60% of the vote. The district had a PVI of R+3.

=== Republican primary ===
==== Candidates ====
===== Nominee =====
- Tom Reed, incumbent U.S. representative

=== Democratic primary ===
==== Candidates ====
===== Nominee =====
- John F. Plumb, aerospace engineer, United States Navy Reserve captain and former acting deputy Assistant Secretary of Defense for Space Policy

=== General election ===
==== Endorsements ====
John Plumb (D)

Labor unions

- New York State United Teachers

Organizations

- Democratic Congressional Campaign Committee "Red to Blue" Program

==== Predictions ====
Source	Ranking	As of
The Cook Political Report	Likely R	November 7, 2016
Daily Kos Elections	Likely R	November 7, 2016
Rothenberg	Safe R	November 3, 2016
Sabato's Crystal Ball	Likely R	November 7, 2016
RCP	Likely R	October 31, 2016

==== Results ====
New York's 23rd congressional district, 2016
Party	Candidate	Votes	%
Republican	Tom Reed	136,964	49.0
Conservative	Tom Reed	16,420	5.9
Independence	Tom Reed	6,790	2.4
Reform	Tom Reed	876	0.3
Total	Tom Reed (incumbent)	161,050	57.6
Democratic	John F. Plumb	106,600	38.1
Working Families	John F. Plumb	11,984	4.3
Total	John F. Plumb	118,584	42.4
Total votes		279,634	100.0
Republican hold			

== District 24 ==
2016 New York's 24th congressional district election
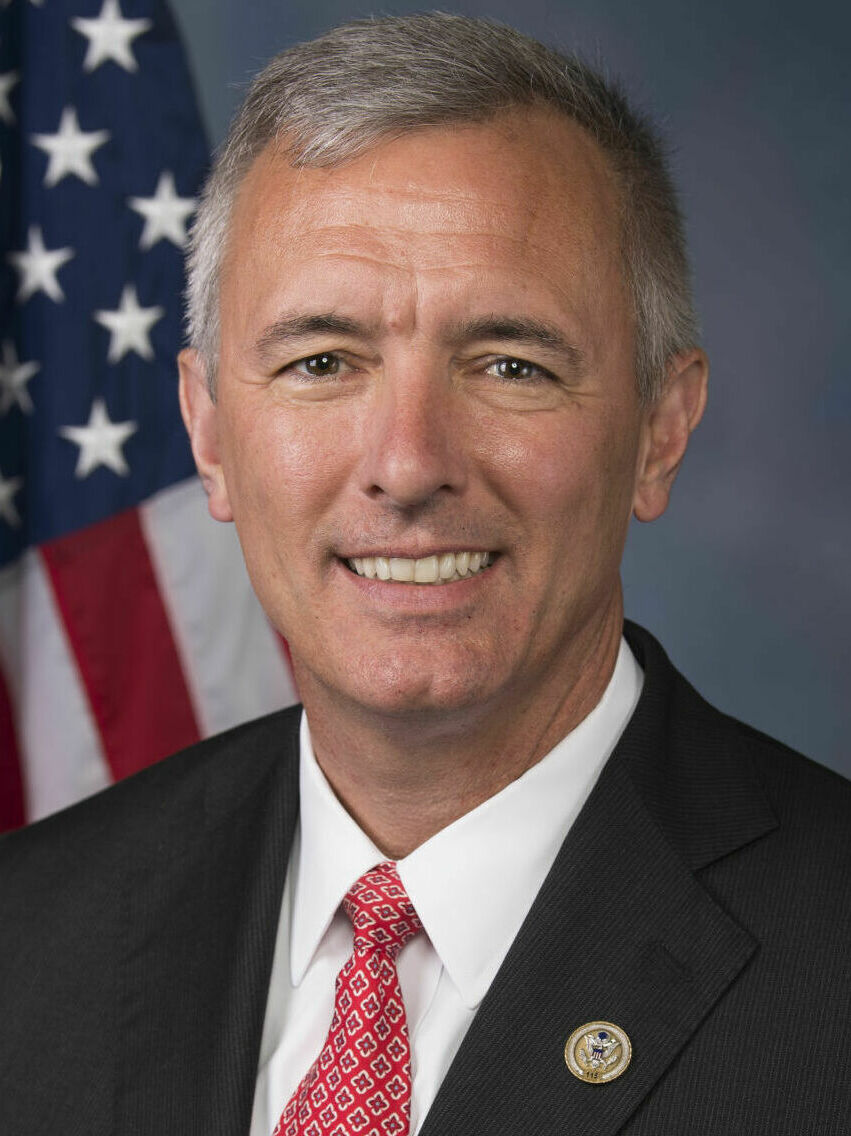

	Majority party	Minority party
Candidate	John Katko	Colleen Deacon
Party	Republican	Democratic
Alliance	Conservative; Reform; Independence	Working Families
Popular vote	182,761	119,040
Percentage	60.6%	39.4%
- County results Tonko: 50–60% 60–70%
U.S. Representative before election
John Katko
Republican
Elected U.S. Representative
John Katko
Republican

The 24th district includes all of Cayuga, Onondaga and Wayne counties, and the western part of Oswego County. The incumbent was Republican John Katko, who had represented the district since 2015. He was elected in 2014 with 59.6% of the vote, defeating Democratic incumbent Dan Maffei. The district had a PVI of D+3.

=== Republican primary ===
==== Candidates ====
===== Nominee =====
- John Katko, incumbent U.S. representative

=== Democratic primary ===
==== Candidates ====
===== Nominee =====
- Colleen Deacon, regional director of U.S. Senator Kirsten Gillibrand's Syracuse office

===== Eliminated in primary =====
- Eric Kingson, professor
- Steven Williams, lawyer and former United States Navy JAG Corps officer

===== Declined =====
- Dan Maffei, former U.S. Representative

==== Endorsements ====
Colleen Deacon

U.S. senators

- Kirsten Gillibrand, New York
- Chuck Schumer, New York

Organizations

- Democratic Congressional Campaign Committee
- EMILY's List
Eric Kingson

U.S. senators

- Bernie Sanders, Vermont

U.S. representatives

- John Conyers, Michigan

Organizations

- Democracy for America
Steven Williams

U.S. representatives

- Steve Israel, New York

==== Results ====
Democratic primary results
Party	Candidate	Votes	%
Democratic	Colleen Deacon	6,517	49.9
Democratic	Eric Kingson	3,994	30.6
Democratic	Steve Williams	2,557	19.5
Total votes		13,068	100.0

=== General election ===
==== Endorsements ====
John Katko (R)

Organizations

- National Republican Congressional Committee "Patriot" Program
Colleen Deacon (D)

Labor unions

- New York State United Teachers

Organizations

- Democratic Congressional Campaign Committee "Red to Blue" Program
- EMILY's List

==== Debates ====
- Complete video of debate, October 25, 2016

==== Polling ====
Poll source	Date(s) administered	Sample size	Margin of error	John Katko (R)	Colleen Deacon (D)	Undecided
Siena College	October 18–19, 2016	673	± 4.1%	54%	31%	14%
Siena College	September 22–29, 2016	655	± 4.8%	53%	34%	12%

Hypothetical polling

Poll source	Date(s) administered	Sample size	Margin of error	John Katko (R)	Eric Kingson (D)	Undecided
Harper Polling (R-NRCC)	September 12–16, 2016	456	±4.6	51%	28%	21%

==== Predictions ====
Source	Ranking	As of
The Cook Political Report	Likely R	November 7, 2016
Daily Kos Elections	Lean R	November 7, 2016
Rothenberg	Likely R	November 3, 2016
Sabato's Crystal Ball	Lean R	November 7, 2016
RCP	Tossup	October 31, 2016

==== Results ====
New York's 24th congressional district, 2016
Party	Candidate	Votes	%
Republican	John Katko	150,330	49.8
Conservative	John Katko	20,399	6.8
Independence	John Katko	10,931	3.6
Reform	John Katko	1,101	0.4
Total	John Katko (incumbent)	182,761	60.6
Democratic	Colleen Deacon	110,550	36.6
Working Families	Colleen Deacon	8,490	2.8
Total	Colleen Deacon	119,040	39.4
Total votes		301,801	100.0
Republican hold			

== District 25 ==
2016 New York's 25th congressional district election
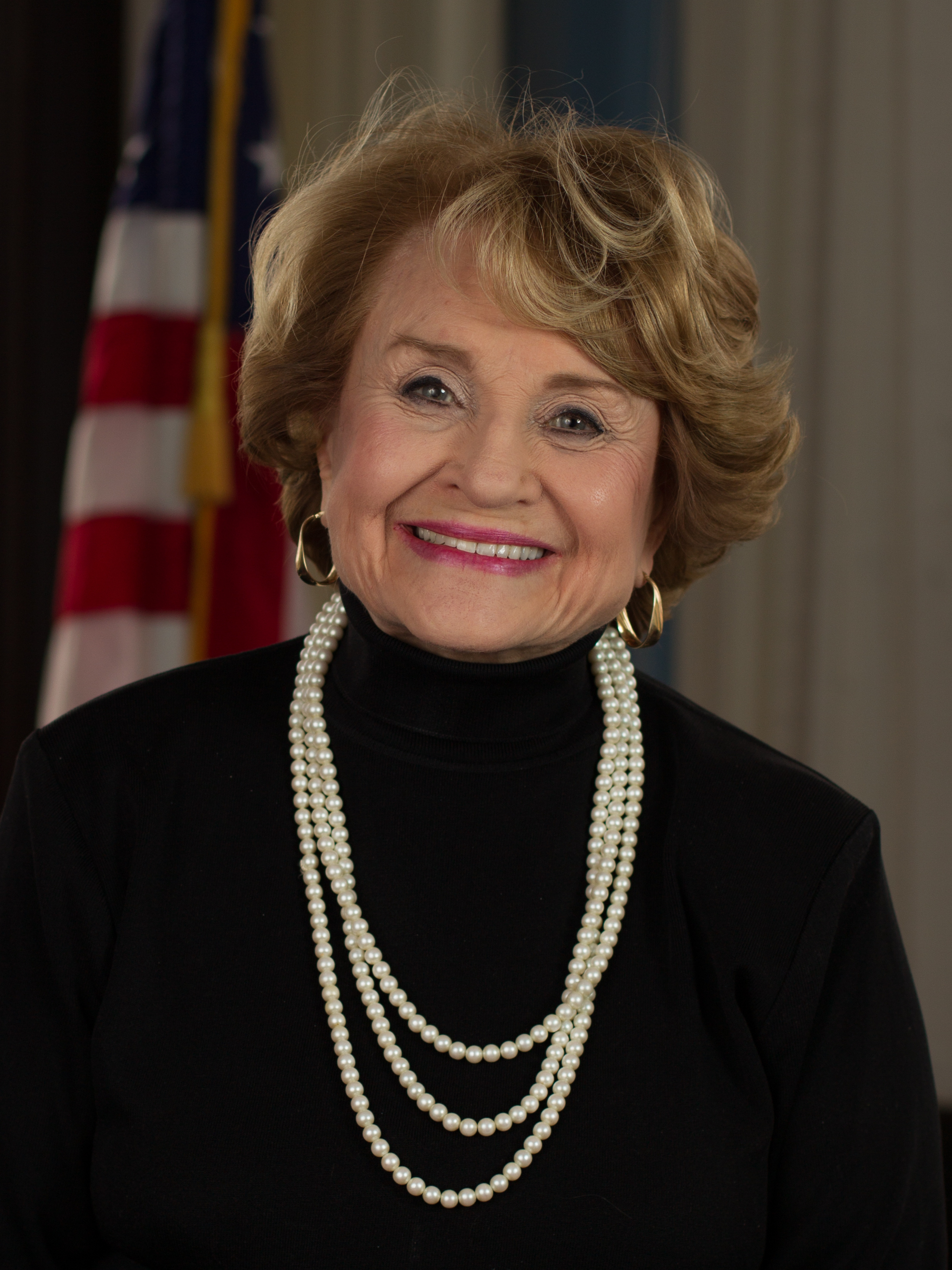

	Majority party	Minority party
Candidate	Louise Slaughter	Mark Assini
Party	Democratic	Republican
Alliance	Working Families; Women's Equality	Conservative; Reform; Independence
Popular vote	182,950	142,650
Percentage	56.2%	43.8%
- County results Slaughter: 50–60%
U.S. Representative before election
Louise Slaughter
Democratic
Elected U.S. Representative
Louise Slaughter
Democratic

The 25th district located entirely within Monroe County, centered on the city of Rochester. The incumbent was Democrat Louise Slaughter, who had represented the district since 2013, and previously represented the 28th district from 1993 to 2013 and the 30th district from 1987 to 1993. Due to Slaughter's age, recent health problems, and the death of her husband, there was speculation that she might retire, but she ran for re-election. She was re-elected in 2014 with 49% of the vote. The district had a PVI of D+7.

=== Democratic primary ===
==== Candidates ====
===== Nominee =====
- Louise Slaughter, incumbent U.S. representative

=== Republican primary ===
==== Candidates ====
===== Nominee =====
- Mark Assini, town supervisor of Gates, Conservative nominee for this seat in 2004 and nominee for this seat in 2014

=== General election ===
==== Endorsements ====
Louise Slaughter (D)

Labor unions

- New York State United Teachers

==== Predictions ====
Source	Ranking	As of
The Cook Political Report	Likely D	November 7, 2016
Daily Kos Elections	Safe D	November 7, 2016
Rothenberg	Safe D	November 3, 2016
Sabato's Crystal Ball	Safe D	November 7, 2016
RCP	Likely D	October 31, 2016

==== Results ====
New York's 25th congressional district, 2016
Party	Candidate	Votes	%
Democratic	Louise Slaughter	168,660	51.8
Working Families	Louise Slaughter	10,195	3.1
Women's Equality	Louise Slaughter	4,095	1.3
Total	Louise Slaughter (incumbent)	182,950	56.2
Republican	Mark Assini	113,840	35.0
Conservative	Mark Assini	20,883	6.4
Independence	Mark Assini	6,856	2.1
Reform	Mark Assini	1,071	0.3
Total	Mark Assini	142,650	43.8
Total votes		325,600	100.0
Democratic hold			

== District 26 ==
2016 New York's 26th congressional district election
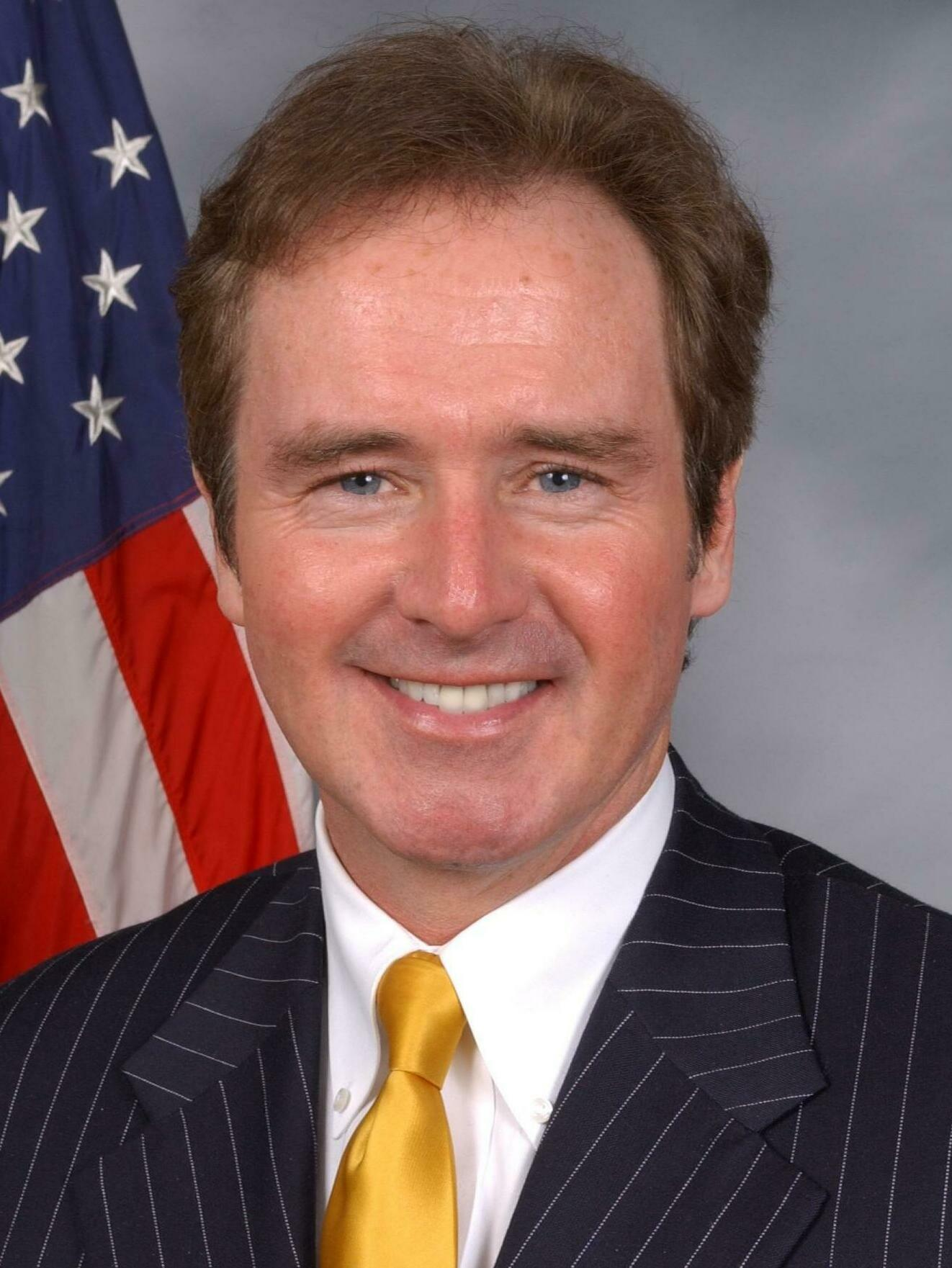

	Majority party	Minority party
Candidate	Brian Higgins	Shelly Schratz
Party	Democratic	Republican
Alliance	Working Families; Women's Equality	Conservative
Popular vote	215,289	73,377
Percentage	74.6%	25.4%
- County results Higgins: 60–70% 70–80%
U.S. Representative before election
Brian Higgins
Democratic
Elected U.S. Representative
Brian Higgins
Democratic

The 25th district located in Erie and Niagara counties and includes the cities of Buffalo and Niagara Falls. Incumbent Democrat Brian Higgins, who had represented the district since 2013, and previously represented the 27th district from 2005 to 2013, ran for re-election. He was re-elected in 2014 with 68% of the vote. The district had a PVI of D+12.

=== Democratic primary ===
==== Candidates ====
===== Nominee =====
- Brian Higgins, incumbent U.S. representative

=== Republican primary ===
==== Candidates ====
===== Nominee =====
- Shelly Schratz, business owner and former Amherst Town Board member

=== General election ===
==== Predictions ====
Source	Ranking	As of
The Cook Political Report	Safe D	November 7, 2016
Daily Kos Elections	Safe D	November 7, 2016
Rothenberg	Safe D	November 3, 2016
Sabato's Crystal Ball	Safe D	November 7, 2016
RCP	Safe D	October 31, 2016

==== Endorsements ====
Brian Higgins (D)

Labor unions

- New York State United Teachers

==== Results ====
New York's 26th congressional district, 2016
Party	Candidate	Votes	%
Democratic	Brian Higgins	195,322	67.7
Working Families	Brian Higgins	16,138	5.6
Women's Equality	Brian Higgins	3,829	1.3
Total	Brian Higgins (incumbent)	215,289	74.6
Republican	Shelly Schratz	56,930	19.7
Conservative	Shelly Schratz	16,447	5.7
Total	Shelly Schratz	73,377	25.4
Total votes		288,666	100.0
Democratic hold			

== District 27 ==
2016 New York's 27th congressional district election
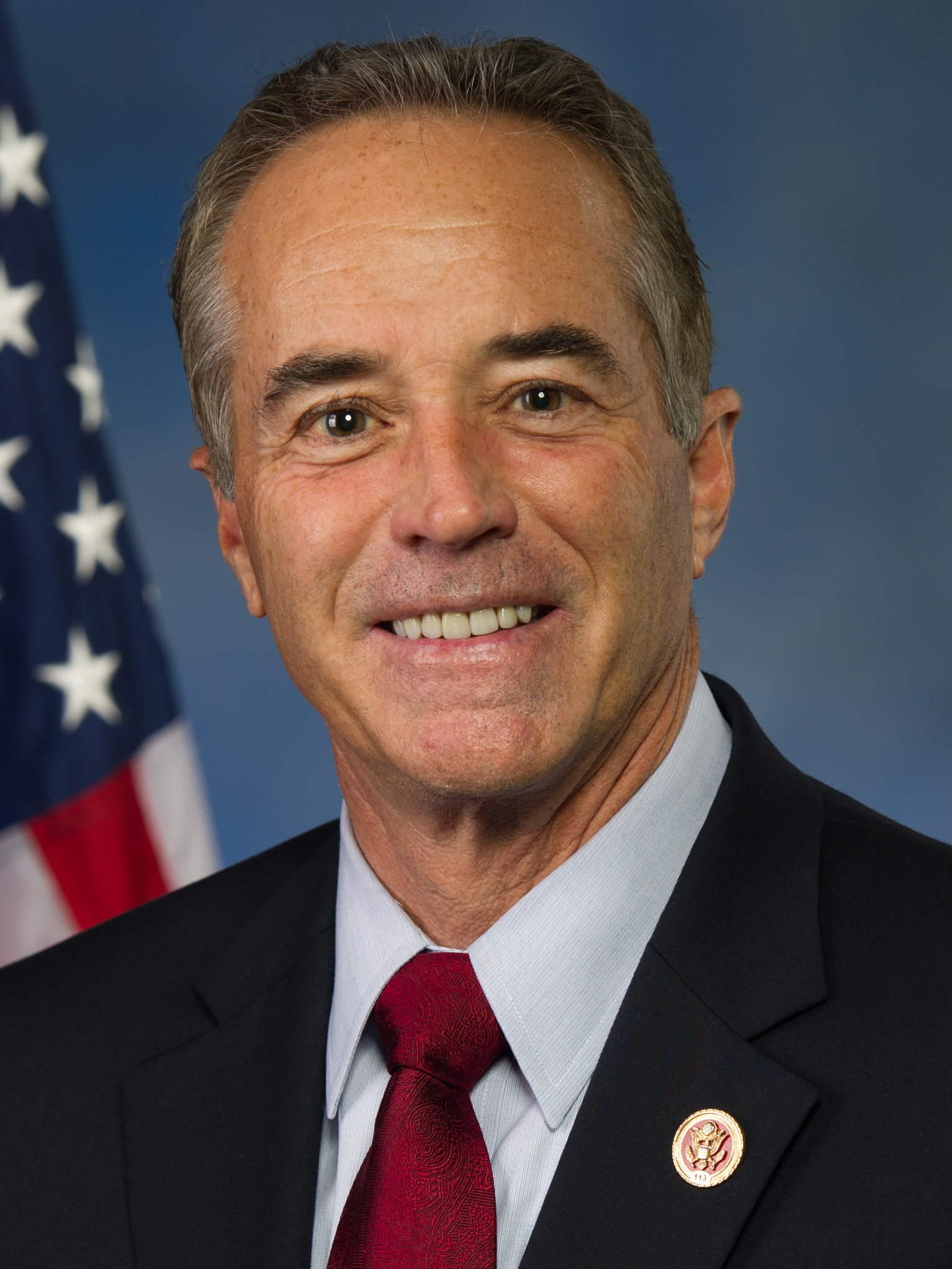

	Majority party	Minority party
Candidate	Chris Collins	Diana K. Kastenbaum
Party	Republican	Democratic
Alliance	Conservative; Reform; Independence
Popular vote	220,885	107,832
Percentage	67.2%	32.8%
- County results Collins: 60–70% 70–80%
U.S. Representative before election
Chris Collins
Republican
Elected U.S. Representative
Chris Collins
Republican

The 27th district is located in Western New York and includes all of Orleans, Genesee, Wyoming and Livingston counties, and parts of Erie, Monroe, Niagara and Ontario counties. Incumbent Republican Chris Collins, who had represented the district since 2013, ran for re-election. He was re-elected in 2014 with 71% of the vote. The district had a PVI of R+8.

=== Republican primary ===
==== Candidates ====
===== Nominee =====
- Chris Collins, incumbent U.S. representative

=== Democratic primary ===
==== Candidates ====
===== Nominee =====
- Diana K. Kastenbaum, small business owner

=== General election ===
==== Endorsements ====
Diana Kastenbaum (D)

Labor unions

- New York State United Teachers

==== Predictions ====
Source	Ranking	As of
The Cook Political Report	Safe R	November 7, 2016
Daily Kos Elections	Safe R	November 7, 2016
Rothenberg	Safe R	November 3, 2016
Sabato's Crystal Ball	Safe R	November 7, 2016
RCP	Safe R	October 31, 2016

==== Results ====
New York's 27th congressional district, 2016
Party	Candidate	Votes	%
Republican	Chris Collins	175,509	53.4
Conservative	Chris Collins	34,292	10.4
Independence	Chris Collins	9,995	3.0
Reform	Chris Collins	1,089	0.3
Total	Chris Collins (incumbent)	220,885	67.2
Democratic	Diana K. Kastenbaum	107,832	32.8
Total votes		328,717	100.0
Republican hold			
