= List of Pennsylvania State University alumni =

The following is a list of notable Pennsylvania State University alumni since the university's founding.

== Alumni ==
=== Academia ===
- Michael Anesko, literary critic, writer and professor; best known for his studies of Henry James and William Dean Howells
- Danielle Bassett, professor at the University of Pennsylvania; youngest individual to be awarded a 2014 MacArthur fellowship
- Samuel Preston Bayard, musicologist; established the folklore program at Penn State
- Robert D. Braun, academic and aerospace engineer; Space Sector head at the Johns Hopkins University Applied Physics Laboratory and former NASA chief technologist
- M. Christopher Brown II, president of Alcorn State University
- T. Colin Campbell, chemist and professor; Jacob Gould Schurman Professor Emeritus of Nutritional Biochemistry at Cornell University
- Vaughn Climenhaga, mathematician and distinguished professor at the University of North Carolina at Charlotte
- Jason De León, professor at UCLA; MacArthur Fellow (2017)
- Walter Dobrogosz, professor; best known for his discovery and further research on the probiotic bacterium Lactobacillus reuteri
- Paul M. Doty, former Mallinckrodt Professor of Biochemistry at Harvard University
- Thomas R. Dye, emeritus professor of Political Science at Florida State University
- Katherine Faber, materials scientist; Simon Ramo Professor of Materials Science at the California Institute of Technology
- John Friedlander, mathematician; fellow of the American Mathematical Society
- A. Roberto Frisancho, biological anthropologist; Arthur F. Thurnau Professor of Anthropology at the University of Michigan
- Roland Fryer, Robert M. Beren Professor of Economics at Harvard University, MacArthur fellow, and recipient of the John Bates Clark Medal
- Edwin R. Gilliland, chemical engineer; former Institute Professor at the Massachusetts Institute of Technology
- Joe Gow (born 1960) (attended West Chester University before transferring to New York University and later to Penn State University, from which he graduated), academic, musician, pornographic actor, and university administrator, noted for being fired as chancellor of the University of Wisconsin–La Crosse in December 2023 after being outed for filming and starring in consensual pornographic videos with his wife, which they posted to public adult websites (without ever mentioning their names, careers, or university affiliations)
- Susanne Hambrusch, computer scientist and professor
- Marci Hamilton, professor at the University of Pennsylvania
- Graham Harman, philosopher and academic
- James T. Harris III, president of Widener University
- John W. Heston, president of Washington State University, South Dakota State University and Dakota State University
- David C. Hodge, president of Miami University in Oxford, Ohio
- Richard Hoover, former president of Hastings College
- Kate Hutton, seismologist; monitored earthquakes at California Institute of Technology for 37 years
- Dugald C. Jackson, electrical engineer; headed the Department of Electrical Engineering of the Massachusetts Institute of Technology 1907–1935
- William Jaco, mathematician; known for his role in the JSJ decomposition theorem
- M. Eric Johnson, dean of the Owen Graduate School of Management, Vanderbilt University
- Mark L. Knapp, Distinguished Teaching Professor Emeritus at the University of Texas at Austin; internationally known for his research on nonverbal communication
- George Koob, professor; director of the National Institute on Alcohol Abuse and Alcoholism
- Leah Krubitzer, neuroscientist; professor of Psychology at University of California, Davis and MacArthur Fellow (1998)
- Max G. Lagally, Erwin W. Mueller Professor and Bascom Professor of Surface Science at the University of Wisconsin–Madison
- Steven Leath, president of Iowa State University 2012–2017 and Auburn University 2017–2019; appointed to the National Science Board in 2018
- Herbert E. Longenecker, former president of Tulane University
- Daniel H. Lowenstein, provost at the University of California, San Francisco
- Jian Ma, computer scientist and computational biologist at Carnegie Mellon University, Guggenheim Fellowship
- Ronald Mallett, theoretical physicist and expert on possibility of time travel
- Robert McGrath, director of Renewable and Sustainable Energy Institute
- Eoin McKiernan, early scholar in Irish Studies
- Lane Mitchell, ceramic engineer; founded Georgia Tech's School of Materials Science and Engineering
- Koraly Pérez-Edgar, McCourtney Professor of Child Studies and professor of Psychology at Pennsylvania State University
- John Pickles, Phillips Distinguished Professor of International Studies in the Department of Geography at the University of North Carolina at Chapel Hill
- Robert B. Pippin, professor at University of Chicago
- Jonathan K. Pritchard, genetics professor at Stanford University
- Tatiana Proskouriakoff, Mayanist scholar and archeologist; contributed significantly to the deciphering of Maya hieroglyphs
- James Purdy, scholar of digital rhetoric
- Merritt Roe Smith, historian; Leverett and William Cutten Professor of the History of Technology at the Massachusetts Institute of Technology
- Richard Somerville, climate scientist; Distinguished Professor Emeritus at Scripps Institution of Oceanography at the University of California, San Diego
- Charles A. Sorber, civil engineer and academic administrator
- George D. Stoddard, former president of the University of Illinois and the University of the State of New York; former chancellor of New York University and Long Island University
- Ian Waitz, vice chancellor at the Massachusetts Institute of Technology
- William Hultz Walker, chemist and professor; former chair of industrial chemistry at the Massachusetts Institute of Technology and former president of the American Electrochemical Society
- James J. Whalen, former president of Ithaca College
- Robert E. Witt, president of University of Alabama
- Iris Marion Young, political and social theorist, professor of Political Science at the University of Chicago

=== Architecture, design, and technology ===
- Louis Astorino, architect, PNC Park, University of Pittsburgh Medical Center
- Paul Blasingame, United States Air Force officer and engineer who played an important role in the development of the Intercontinental Ballistic Missile
- Matt Brezina, co-founder of Xobni
- Robert J. Cenker, aerospace and electrical engineer; worked at RCA Astro-Electronics and its successor company GE Astro Space on a variety of spacecraft projects
- Stanley Cole (1948), architect, designer of Citizens Bank Park
- Douglas Comer, computer science professor at Purdue; designed and implemented the Xinu operating system
- Joe Fafard, sculptor; officer of the Order of Canada, 1981
- Nelson L. Goldberg, developed the first cable system to be acquired by Comcast
- Selda Gunsel, chemical engineer
- Samuel Kurtz Hoffman, engineer who specialized in rocket propulsion; developed the F-1 engines that would power the Saturn V rocket, and later worked on the Space Shuttle Main Engine
- John Hoke III, chief design officer of Nike
- Ehsan Hoque, computer scientist and academic
- Jim Keller, engineer, AMD, Apple Inc. and Tesla Motors
- John Mashey, computer scientist and entrepreneur; developed the ASSIST assembler language teaching software while at Penn State
- Jef Raskin, engineer, Apple Inc.; conceived and initiated the Macintosh project at Apple in the late 1970s
- Der Scutt, architect; designed a number of major and notable buildings throughout New York City and the United States
- Harry Shoemaker, pioneer radio engineer
- John H. Sinfelt, chemical engineer; research on catalytic reforming was responsible for the introduction of unleaded gasoline
- Ross William Ulbricht, founder of the Silk Road, as "Dread Pirate Roberts"

=== Art and literature ===
- Diane Ackerman, poet and naturalist
- Steve Alten, author, MEG series, Domain series, and The Loch
- John Balaban, author, poet, Words for My Daughter and Locusts at the Edge of Summer
- John Barth, writer
- John T. Biggers, African-American muralist who came to prominence after the Harlem Renaissance
- Caroline Bowman, Broadway actress
- Dale Brown, bestselling author, Act of War, Battle Born, and Plan of Attack
- Erica Cho, artist
- Jeanne Clemson, theater director, stage actress, and teacher; preserved the Fulton Opera House
- Geffrey Davis, poet
- Richard Diehl (M.A. 1965, Ph.D. 1969), Mesoamerican archaeologist and academic, expert on the Olmec civilization
- Kathleen Frank, artist
- Alan Furst, novelist
- Jean Craighead George, Newbery Medal-winning children's author
- Aaron Gilbert (A.S. 2000), painter
- Chip Kidd, book-jacket designer
- Norris J. Lacy, expert on the Arthurian legend
- Paul Levine, novelist, Jake Lassiter crime fiction series, screenwriter, JAG and First Monday
- Jerome Loving (BA), professor of American Literature and Culture at the University of Texas at Austin
- Anderson Delano Macklin (1933–2001), artist, educator
- Steve McCurry, photojournalist; most known for photograph of the "Afghan Girl" in National Geographic Magazine
- Susan Miller, playwright, My Left Breast, two-time Obie winner, Eugene O'Neill Contest winner, Emmy nominee
- David Morrell, novelist, First Blood
- James Morrow, author
- Robert Neffson, artist
- Lynne Rae Perkins, Newbery Medal-winning children's author
- John Pielmeier, playwright, Agnes of God
- Dianne H. Pilgrim, art historian and museum professional; held research and curatorial positions at the Metropolitan Museum of Art, Finch College Museum of Art, and Brooklyn Museum of Art
- Davis Schneiderman, writer and professor at Lake Forest College
- Annika Sharma, author
- Oliver Smith, ten-time Tony Award-winning scenic designer
- David Wagoner, poet; former chancellor of the Academy of American Poets
- Henry Wessel Jr., photographer; recipient of two Guggenheim Fellowships
- Sophia Wisniewska, university administrator
- Robert Yarber, artist

=== Business and industry ===
- Louis D'Ambrosio, former CEO of Sears Holdings Corporation
- Donald W. Davis, former CEO of Stanley Black & Decker; taught at MIT Sloan School of Management for over 20 years
- Robert E. Eberly, chairman of Eberly Natural Gas Co.; Penn State benefactor
- Herman Fisher, co-founder of Fisher-Price toy company
- Kenneth Frazier, chairman and CEO, Merck & Company
- Jacqueline Hinman, former CEO of CH2M
- Lloyd Huck, chairman emeritus of Merck & Company and former CEO of Nova Pharmaceutical
- Richard T. James, inventor of the Slinky
- Saad Sherida al-Kaabi, president and CEO of QatarEnergy
- Lewis Katz, former co-owner of The Philadelphia Inquirer, New Jersey Nets and New Jersey Devils
- Andrew Thomas Kearney, founder of Kearney; first partner at McKinsey & Company
- Albert Lord, former CEO of Sallie Mae
- Craig Martell, computer scientist and technology executive
- Mike McBath, co-founder, part-owner of the Orlando Predators
- Gertrude Michelson, businesswoman; first woman to head the board of trustees at an Ivy League University (Columbia) and first woman to sit on the board of Macy's and General Electric
- Barry Myers, attorney, former CEO of AccuWeather; nominated by Donald Trump to lead the National Oceanic and Atmospheric Administration
- Joel N. Myers, founder and executive chairman of AccuWeather
- Eugene O'Kelly, former CEO of KPMG
- Mark Parker, executive chairman and former CEO of Nike
- Karen Peetz, first female president of The Bank of New York Mellon
- Terry Pegula, billionaire owner of the Buffalo Sabres and Buffalo Bills
- Alan Pottasch, advertising executive and marketer best known for his five decades of work for PepsiCo
- Hugh Ellsworth Rodham, textile wholesaler; father of Secretary of State Hillary Clinton
- Lindsay Rosenwald, doctor and life-sciences industry investor
- William Schreyer, chairman emeritus and former CEO of Merrill Lynch; namesake of Schreyer Honors College
- Alan Schriesheim, former CEO of Argonne National Laboratory
- Joanna Shields, Baroness Shields, technology executive and former British government official
- Frank Smeal, partner, Goldman Sachs; namesake of Smeal College of Business
- Derek V. Smith, former CEO of ChoicePoint
- Jim Stengel, former global marketing officer of Procter & Gamble
- John P. Surma, former CEO of US Steel
- Richard Trumka, AFL–CIO president
- Paul Twomey, businessman; founding figure of ICANN
- Verne M. Willaman, former member of the executive committee of Johnson & Johnson
- Patricia A. Woertz, former CEO of Archer Daniel Midland; on Fortune magazine's "Most Powerful Women in Business" list
- Linda Yaccarino, former CEO of X Corp
- Geoff Martha, Chairman and CEO of Medtronic
- Walt Rakowich, former CEO of Prologis

=== Entertainment and media ===
- Gerald W. Abrams, television producer; father of J.J. Abrams
- John Aniston, actor, Days of Our Lives; father of actress Jennifer Aniston
- Brian Baker, former Sprint spokesman
- Donald L. Barlett, investigative journalist; two-time Pulitzer Prize winner
- Peter Barnes, journalist; senior Washington correspondent for the Fox Business Network
- Donald P. Bellisario, television producer
- Charles Bierbauer, television journalist
- Edward Binns, actor, 12 Angry Men, Fail Safe
- Lindsey Broad, actress, The Office, Benders
- Benjy Bronk, comedian and writer, The Howard Stern Show
- Ryan Buell, founder of the Paranormal Research Society
- Ty Burrell, actor, star of sitcom Modern Family
- Jeff Cardoni, composer; known for work on television projects such as CSI: Miami, Silicon Valley, and The League
- Margaret Carlson, journalist, pundit; first female columnist for TIME
- Leon Carr, songwriter and composer
- Victoria Cartagena, actress, The Bedford Diaries, Gotham
- Jimmy Cefalo, journalist and sports broadcaster
- Nathan Cook, actor, The White Shadow, Hotel
- Jill Cordes, TV personality, HGTV's My First Place and The Best Of
- John A. Dalles, hymn writer and clergyman
- Bruce Davison, actor; received an Oscar nomination for his role in Longtime Companion
- Steven E. de Souza, screenwriter; Judge Dredd, Beverly Hills Cop III, 48 Hrs., Die Hard
- Eileen DeSandre, actress
- Julius J. Epstein, screenwriter of Casablanca
- Patrick Fabian, actor, Better Call Saul
- Katie Feeney, social media personality
- Carmen Finestra, Emmy Award-winning television writer and producer; The Cosby Show, Home Improvement
- Jasmine Forsberg, musical theatre actress; Stephen Sondheim's Old Friends
- Jonathan Frakes, actor and director (Star Trek: The Next Generation)
- Jared Freid, comedian, television host, podcaster, writer
- Sara Ganim, journalist; won 2012 Pulitzer Prize for Local Reporting, third-youngest winner of a Pulitzer Prize
- Erica Grow, meteorologist, WPIX in New York City
- Tom Hannifan, professional wrestling announcer and color commentator
- Kim Jones, clubhouse reporter for the New York Yankees and the YES Network
- Shiva Kandukuri, actor in Indian cinema
- Christine Kay, journalist; conceived and edited the Portraits of Grief profile series on the victims of the September 11 attacks
- Gene Kelly, actor, dancer, director; An American in Paris, Singin' in the Rain
- Keegan-Michael Key, actor, comedian; MADtv, host of Animal Planet's The Planet's Funniest Animals
- Don Roy King, director of Saturday Night Live 2006–2021
- Peter W. Klein, journalist and documentary filmmaker; founder of the Global Reporting Centre
- Stan Lathan, television producer and director, co-creator of Def Comedy Jam
- Paul Levine, lawyer, novelist, screenwriter, author of the "Jake Lassiter" and "Solomon vs. Lord" series
- Rick Lyon, actor/creator of Broadway show Avenue Q
- Adam McKay, film director and screenwriter; writer and director of Anchorman: The Legend of Ron Burgundy, Talladega Nights: The Ballad of Ricky Bobby, and The Landlord
- Alano Miller, actor; Underground, Dexter: New Blood
- Norman Charles Miller, journalist; Pulitzer Prize winner
- Vance Packard, journalist and social critic; author of The Naked Society
- Amy Wynn Pastor, TV personality, Trading Spaces
- Paul Pringle, journalist, three-time Pulitzer Prize winner
- Mike Reid, Grammy Award-winning songwriter
- Ian Rosenberger, contestant on Survivor: Palau; former president of Penn State's USG
- Michael S. Rosenfeld, talent agent and co-founder of Creative Artists Agency
- Lisa Salters, ESPN reporter and former Nittany Lady Lion basketball star
- Herb Sargent, television writer and producer; worked on The Tonight Show and Saturday Night Live, created Weekend Update with Chevy Chase
- Richard L. Schlegel, LGBT rights activist and editor of Drum and other gay culture magazines
- Lara Spencer, co-anchor of Good Morning America
- Joonas Suotamo, Chewbacca actor in Star Wars: The Force Awakens, former Penn State Basketball forward/center
- Talia Suskauer, musical theatre actress
- Don Taylor, film actor of the 1940s and 1950s
- Tom Verducci, senior writer for Sports Illustrated
- Andrew Kevin Walker, screenwriter of Seven
- Fred Waring, bandleader
- Mel Welles, actor and director
- Alfie Wise, actor
- Rake Yohn, CKY crew; Jackass crew member; synthetic metal chemist

=== Politics, government, and military ===
- Harry J. Anslinger, first commissioner of the U.S. Treasury Department's Federal Bureau of Narcotics during the presidencies of Herbert Hoover, Franklin D. Roosevelt, Harry S. Truman, Dwight D. Eisenhower, and John F. Kennedy
- William P. Atkinson, former member of the Wisconsin State Assembly
- Kelly Ayotte, governor of New Hampshire, former U.S. senator (R-NH)
- David Bailey Jr., member of the New Jersey General Assembly
- Jerry G. Beck Jr., US Army brigadier general
- William Binney, former intelligence official and whistleblower associated with the Trailblazer Project
- Dana H. Born, lecturer in public policy at the Harvard Kennedy School of Government and retired brigadier general in the United States Air Force
- Donald Burdick, United States Army major general, director of Army National Guard
- Christopher F. Burne, brigadier general, United States Air Force
- Caroline Casagrande, member of the New Jersey General Assembly
- Kathleen L. Casey, commissioner of the U.S. Securities and Exchange Commission
- Frank A. Cipolla, brigadier general, United States Army Reserve
- Jake Corman, member of the Pennsylvania State Senate (R-PA 34)
- Andrew Curtin, Civil War governor of Pennsylvania (1861–1867)
- Timothy DeFoor, auditor general of Pennsylvania
- Charlie Dent, former U.S. congressman (R-PA-15)
- Donald DiFrancesco, former governor of New Jersey
- Andy Dinniman, Pennsylvania state senator
- Michael F. Doyle, U.S. congressman (D-PA 14)
- Thomas V. Falkie, 14th director of the U.S. Bureau of Mines
- Howard Fargo, former member of the Pennsylvania House of Representatives
- Tom Feeney, former U.S. congressman (R-FL 24) and former speaker of the Florida House of Representatives
- John Sydney Fine, former Pennsylvania governor (1951–1955)
- Jon D. Fox, former U.S congressman (R-PA 13) and former member of the Pennsylvania House of Representatives (R-PA 153)
- Barbara Hackman Franklin, former U.S. secretary of commerce
- Harold Gehman, former commander-in-chief of the U.S. Joint Forces Command and former NATO supreme allied commander, Atlantic
- J. D. Gordon, former Pentagon spokesman, national television commentator, columnist
- Huban A. Gowadia, US government official; former deputy administrator of the Transportation Security Administration
- Josh Green, governor of Hawaii
- Priscilla Guthrie, former associate director of National Intelligence and chief information officer
- Jay Hammond, politician; former governor of Alaska
- Patrick J. Harkins, member of the Pennsylvania House of Representatives
- B. Frank Heintzleman, former governor of Alaska Territory
- Caroline C. Hunter, member of the Federal Election Commission (FEC)
- Alan Isaacman, attorney, argued the case Hustler Magazine v. Falwell before U.S. Supreme Court
- Arthur Horace James, former Pennsylvania governor (1939–1943)
- John James, U.S. representative from Michigan's 10th congressional district
- Robert Jubelirer, former president pro tempore of the Pennsylvania State Senate, former lieutenant governor of Pennsylvania
- Theodore H. Kattouf, former U.S. ambassador to Syria
- C. Robert Kehler, commander of Air Force Space Command
- Tom Killion, Pennsylvania state representative for the 168th district (2003–2016), Pennsylvania state senator for the 9th Senatorial District (2016–present)
- Maria Leavey, political strategist
- Lee Ju-yeol, governor of the Bank of Korea
- Mary Beth Long, US government official
- Reece J. Lutz, US Army brigadier general
- Roger A. Madigan (1930–2018), Pennsylvania state senator and representative
- Craig H. Martell, inaugural chief Digital and Artificial Intelligence officer, U.S. Department of Defense
- John L. McLucas, FAA administrator, secretary of the Air Force, director of NRO, president of MITRE
- Edward B. Montgomery, economist and politician; former U.S. deputy secretary of labor
- Jill Morgenthaler, retired colonel, U.S. Army; Illinois politician
- Michael P. Murphy, U.S. Navy SEAL and Medal of Honor recipient
- Thomas Murt, member of the Pennsylvania House of Representatives (R-PA 152)
- Bonnie Newman, member of the Reagan and George H. W. Bush administrations, chief of staff to Judd Gregg
- Bernie O'Neill, member of the Pennsylvania House of Representatives (R-PA 29)
- William Pagonis, director of American logistics during the Gulf War
- Kevin Parker, New York state senator
- Scott Perry, U.S. congressman (R-PA 4)
- William Perry, former U.S. secretary of defense
- Joe Pitts, fighter pilot
- Michael Piwowar, acting SEC chair January–May 2017
- Valerie Plame, former CIA officer
- Walter F. Pudlowski Jr., US Army major general
- Russell Redding, Pennsylvania secretary of agriculture
- Tom Ridge, first U.S. secretary of Homeland Security; 43rd governor of Pennsylvania
- Hugh Edwin Rodham, politician; brother of Secretary of State Hillary Clinton
- James Patrick Rossiter, mayor of Erie, Pennsylvania
- Russell Ruderman, member of the Hawaii State Senate
- Walter Runte, member of the Maine House of Representatives
- Francisco Sagasti, interim president of Peru as of November 2020
- Rick Santorum, former U.S. senator (R-PA) and congressman (R-PA 18)
- Richard Schweiker, former U.S. senator (R-PA) and secretary of Health and Human Services
- Saad Ali Shire, current minister of Finance of Somaliland, former foreign minister of Somaliland, and former minister of Planning of Somaliland
- D. Brooks Smith, senior United States circuit judge of the United States Court of Appeals for the Third Circuit
- Samuel H. Smith, member and speaker of the Pennsylvania House of Representatives (R-PA 66)
- Donald Snyder, member of the Pennsylvania House of Representatives, 1981–2000; majority whip
- Stanley Sporkin, former judge of the United States District Court for the District of Columbia
- Su Jain-rong, finance minister of the Republic of China (Taiwan)
- Adrian Tam, Hawaii state representative
- Lyonpo Jigme Thinley, prime minister of Bhutan
- Glenn Thompson, U.S. congressman (R-PA 15)
- George J. Trautman, III, lieutenant general, United States Marine Corps
- Slobodan Uzelac, deputy prime minister of the Croatian government
- Jessica Velasquez (B.D.), chair of the Democratic Party of New Mexico
- William E. Ward, general, United States Army
- R. Seth Williams, former district attorney of Philadelphia
- Frank Wolf, former U.S. congressman (R-VA 10)
- John J. Yeosock, United States Army lieutenant general, commanded the 3rd U.S. Army during Operation Desert Shield and Operation Desert Storm
- Jim Youngsman, member of the Washington House of Representatives
- John Yudichak, Pennsylvania state senator for the 14th district since 2011

=== Science and medicine ===
- Elliott Abrams, Accuweather meteorologist
- Mary Albert, earth scientist, professor of engineering at Dartmouth College, and executive director of the US Ice Drilling Program at the Cold Regions Research and Engineering Laboratory
- Daniel Amey, applications engineer and IEEE fellow
- Cynthia Beall, anthropologist; research on people living in extremely high mountains became the frontier in understanding human evolution and high-altitude adaptation
- Paul Berg, recipient of 1980 Nobel Prize in Chemistry
- Deborah Birx, physician and diplomat; coordinator of the White House Coronavirus Task Force under President Donald Trump 2020–2021
- Theodore H. Blau, first clinician in independent practice to be elected president of the American Psychological Association
- Benjamin Bloom, educational psychologist; made contributions to the theory of mastery learning
- Lois Bloom, developmental psychologist and Edward Lee Thorndike Professor Emerita of Psychology and Education at Teachers College, Columbia University
- Guion Bluford, astronaut, first African-American in space
- David Bohm, quantum physicist known for the Aharanov-Bohm effect, Bohm diffusion, and Bohm interpretation
- Amber E. Boydstun, political scientist and data scientist
- Roscoe Brady, neuroscientist and senior investigator at the National Institutes of Health
- Zena Cardman, geobiologist and NASA astronaut
- John M. Carpenter (B.S. 1957), nuclear engineer, Fellow of the American Association for the Advancement of Science
- Robert Cenker, Space Shuttle astronaut, STS-61-C
- Jane C. Charlton, professor of astronomy and astrophysics
- Dennis S. Charney, dean of Mount Sinai School of Medicine in New York City
- Bin Chen, material scientist at NASA's Ames Research Center
- John Call Cook, played a crucial role in establishing the field of ground-penetrating radar; received the first PhD in geophysics at Penn State in 1951
- William R. Cotton, meteorologist; developed the Regional Atmospheric Modeling System (RAMS) with Roger A. Pielke
- Luther Cressman, field archaeologist; most widely known for his discoveries at Paleo-Indian sites such as Fort Rock Cave and Paisley Caves
- Muriel Davisson, neuroscientist
- Delbert Day, engineer; co-inventor of TheraSphere glass microspheres for medical and dental applications, and Glasphalt, which recycles waste glass for use in asphalt paving
- Shawn Domagal-Goldman (Ph.D.), astrobiologist at NASA
- Wesley Donahue, professor of Workforce Development in the Department of Learning and Performance Systems at Penn State
- Ted Eisenberg, D.O., Guinness World Record holder for most breast augmentation surgeries performed
- Nina Fedoroff, plant geneticist, member of the U.S. National Academy of Science
- Gregory S. Forbes, meteorologist, severe thunderstorm and tornado expert, The Weather Channel severe weather expert
- Raymond D. Fowler, psychologist and former president of the American Psychological Association
- Donald R. F. Harleman, civil engineer; water pollution expert who aided cleanups worldwide
- James T Harris III (D.Ed. 1988), educator and academic administrator; 2003 Alumni Fellow Award recipient
- William Kenneth Hartmann, planetary scientist; first to convince the scientific mainstream that the Earth had once been hit by a planet-sized body (Theia)
- Nina G. Jablonski, Evan Pugh Professor of Anthropology, fellow of American Philosophical Society and American Academy of Arts and Sciences
- Paul Julian, meteorologist; with Roland A. Madden, discovered the atmospheric phenomena known as the Madden–Julian oscillation
- Eunseong Kim, experimental low temperature physicist
- Tina Lasisi, biological anthropologist
- Gardner Lindzey, psychologist and former president of the American Psychological Association
- Daniel H. Lowenstein, physician; known for his work in epilepsy
- Shirley M. Malcom, senior advisor and director of SEA Change at the American Association for the Advancement of Science; trustee of California Institute of Technology
- Stephen L. Mayo, professor at the California Institute of Technology; William K. Bowes Jr. Leadership Chair in the Division of Biology and Biological Engineering and the Bren Professor of Biology and Chemistry; elected to the United States National Academy of Sciences in 2004, appointed to a six-year term on the National Science Board in 2013
- Chad Mirkin, chemist focusing on nanotechnology; member of the President's Council of Advisors on Science and Technology, NAS, NAE, and IOM
- Prasant Mohapatra, computer scientist; vice chancellor of University of California Davis
- Erwin Wilhelm Müller, physicist; inventor of the field ion microscope; first person to "see" an atom
- Albert L. Myerson, scientist; contributed greatly to the Manhattan Project
- SonBinh Nguyen, Dow Chemical Company research professor of Chemistry at Northwestern University
- Ross Overbeek, computer scientist; known for work at the Argonne National Laboratory
- Charles G. Overberger, chemist; former president of the American Chemical Society
- Charles S. Parker, botanist and head of Department of Botany, Howard University (1932–1948)
- Stuart Patton, dairy scientist known for his research in the fields of milk chemistry
- James Pawelczyk, Space Shuttle astronaut, STS-90
- Paolo Piccione, mathematician president of the Brazilian Mathematical Society 2017
- Roger A. Pielke, meteorologist; spearheaded development of the Regional Atmospheric Modeling System (RAMS) with William R. Cotton
- Tomaž Pisanski, mathematician; considered by many Slovenian mathematicians to be the "father of Slovenian discrete mathematics"
- Jef Raskin, author and human–computer interface expert, known for starting the Macintosh project for Apple Computer
- David L. Reich, president and COO of the Mount Sinai Hospital in New York City, chair of the Department of Anesthesiology, Horace W. Goldsmith Professor of Anesthesiology, known for use of electronic medical records for large-scale retrospective investigations
- Charles M. Rick, plant geneticist and botanist who pioneered research on the origins of the tomato; Guggenheim Fellow
- Bernard Rimland, research psychologist; influential in the field of developmental disorders
- Louis Rosen, nuclear physicist; "father" of the Los Alamos Neutron Science Center accelerator; worked on the Manhattan Project during World War II
- Rustum Roy, physicist; professor at Penn State and leader in materials research; former member of National Academy of Engineering
- Samuel Philip Sadtler, chemist; first president of the American Institute of Chemical Engineers
- Justin O. Schmidt, entomologist and creator of the Schmidt sting pain index
- Mike Seidel, meteorologist; reporter at The Weather Channel since 1992
- Richard Bruce Silverman, Patrick G. Ryan/Aon Professor of Chemistry at Northwestern University; known for the discovery of pregabalin, which is marketed by Pfizer under the brand name Lyrica
- Joseph H. Simons, chemist; discovered one of the first practical ways to mass-produce fluorocarbons
- Vaclav Smil, professor, author, scientist and policy analyst
- Lyndon Smith, professor in Computer Simulation and Machine Vision at the University of the West of England
- Fred Tappert, physicist whose primary contributions were in underwater acoustics
- Robert Titzer, professor and infant researcher
- Ben Wang, industrial engineer and director of the Georgia Tech Manufacturing Institute
- Warren M. Washington, atmospheric scientist; former chair of the National Science Board and current senior scientist at the National Center for Atmospheric Research
- Owen Webster, distinguished member of the organic and polymer chemistry communities
- Paul J. Weitz, astronaut, Skylab 2, STS-6
- Mary Louisa Willard, scientist internationally recognized for her work in microscopy and forensic science

=== Sports ===
- David Aardsma, major league pitcher; spent 1 semester before transferring to Rice University
- Monica Aksamit (born 1990), saber fencer, won a bronze medal at the 2016 Summer Olympics in the women's saber team competition
- John Amaechi, former professional basketball player; BBC, ITV, and SKY television personality
- Adrian Amos, NFL player, Green Bay Packers
- Richie Anderson, former NFL running back
- LaVar Arrington, All-Pro NFL linebacker; radio personality
- Horace Ashenfelter, 1952 Olympic gold medalist, track and field
- Mohammed Asif, professional sailor and space propulsion researcher
- Charlie Atherton, Major League Baseball third baseman
- Chris Babb (born 1990), basketball player in the Israeli Basketball Premier League
- Britt Baker, professional wrestler and dentist
- Mark Baldwin, former Major League baseball player
- Saquon Barkley, NFL running back, NFL Rookie of the Year (2018), NFL Pro Bowl (2018)
- Terry Bartlett, Olympic gymnast
- Talor Battle, basketball player who last played for Hapoel Tel Aviv of the Israeli League
- Alex Bentley, WNBA player, Connecticut Sun
- Brandon Bell, NFL Linebacker
- Todd Blackledge, retired NFL quarterback; television sports analyst
- Saeed Blacknall, NFL wide receiver
- Calvin Booth, general manager of the Denver Nuggets
- NaVorro Bowman, NFL linebacker for the San Francisco 49ers
- Kyle Brady, NFL tight end
- Roman Bravo-Young, Mexican-American wrestler who represented Mexico in the 2024 Summer Olympics
- Frank Brickowski, former professional basketball player
- Jim Britton, MLB pitcher
- Courtney Brown, NFL defensive end and No. 1 overall NFL draft pick
- Gary Brown, Cleveland Browns running backs coach; former NFL running back
- Nate Bump, professional baseball player
- John Cappelletti, Heisman Trophy winner and subject of book Something for Joey
- Tony Carr (born 1997), basketball player in the Israeli Premier Basketball League
- Ki-Jana Carter, NFL halfback and No. 1 overall NFL draft pick
- Ken Chertow, US wrestling team and Olympian, 1986–1993
- Mary Ellen Clark, 1992 and 1996 Olympic bronze medalist, diving
- Kerry Collins, Pro Bowl NFL quarterback and 4,000-yard passer (2002)
- Shane Conlan, former NFL linebacker
- Dan Connor, NFL linebacker for the Dallas Cowboys
- Frank Coonelly, president, Pittsburgh Pirates
- Bob Coulson, former Major League Baseball player
- Birdie Cree, former Major League Baseball player
- Joe Crispin, professional basketball player
- Patrick Cummins, 2004 NCAA runner-up wrestler; mixed martial arts fighter, currently competing in the UFC
- Helen Darling, WNBA guard for the San Antonio Silver Stars
- Phil Davis, current Bellator MMA Light Heavyweight (205 lb) contender
- D.J. Dozier, former NFL running back
- Cal Emery, Major League Baseball first baseman
- Bobby Engram, NFL wide receiver with the Seattle Seahawks
- Jim Farr, Major League Baseball pitcher
- Kevin Foley, PGA Tour golfer
- Bill Ford, Major League Baseball pitcher
- Tim Frazier, NBA player, Washington Wizards
- Laura Freigang, footballer for the Germany national team
- Mitch Frerotte, former NFL guard with the Buffalo Bills
- Sam Gash, former professional fullback, Baltimore Ravens, New England Patriots, Buffalo Bills; current Detroit Lions assistant coach
- Robert Gibson, Major League Baseball pitcher
- Garry Gilliam, NFL player
- John Gilmore, NFL tight end
- Chris Godwin, NFL wide receiver
- Shaul Gordon (born 1994), Canadian-Israeli Olympic sabre fencer
- Robbie Gould, professional kicker for the San Francisco 49ers
- Milt Graff, Major League Baseball second baseman
- Rosey Grier, former professional football player
- Hinkey Haines, football player
- Tamba Hali, NFL defensive lineman
- Jack Ham, former professional football player
- Micha Hancock, US Olympic gold medalist in women's volleyball
- Christa Harmotto, US Olympic silver and bronze medalist in women's volleyball
- Franco Harris, former NFL running back
- Jeff Hartings, All-Pro NFL offensive lineman
- Michael Haynes, NFL defensive end
- Cliff Heathcote, former Major League Baseball player
- Dan Heisman, chess master
- Alan Helffrich, Olympic athlete; winner of gold medal in 4 × 400 m relay at the 1924 Summer Olympics
- George Hesselbacher, Major League Baseball pitcher
- Jordan Hill, NFL player, Seattle Seahawks
- Megan Hodge, US Olympic silver medalist in women's volleyball
- Mike Hull, NFL player
- Robert Irimescu, professional rugby union player for the Romanian national side
- Tom Irwin, former Major League Baseball player
- Bubba Jenkins (attended), 2008 runner-up, 2011 National Champion wrestler at 157 lbs., professional MMA fighter
- Larry Johnson Jr., Pro Bowl NFL running back
- Joel Johnston, Major League Baseball pitcher
- John Jones, Major League Baseball outfielder
- Bhawoh Jue, NFL safety
- Joe Jurevicius, NFL wide receiver
- Jeremy Kapinos, NFL Pittsburgh Steelers punter
- Jimmy Kennedy, NFL defensive tackle
- Ed Klepfer, former Major League Baseball player
- Pip Koehler, Major League Baseball outfielder
- Joe Kovacs, USATF Olympic shot putter, won world championships in 2015 and 2019
- Ali Krieger, professional women's soccer player, United States Women's National Soccer Team, Orlando Pride
- Tom Lawless, Major League Baseball player and manager
- Sean Lee, NFL linebacker for the Dallas Cowboys
- Al Leiter, former MLB All-Star and World Series champion
- Trey Lewis (born 1992), basketball player in the Israeli Basketball Premier League
- Ken Loeffler, former La Salle University men's basketball coach
- Maggie Lucas, WNBA player, Indiana Fever
- Andrew Mackiewicz (born 1995), Olympic saber fencer
- David Macklin, NFL cornerback
- Mandy Marquardt, USA Cycling national team
- Michael Mauti, NFL player, New Orleans Saints
- Kelly Mazzante, professional basketball player
- Mike McBath, co-founder and part owner of the Orlando Predators
- Suzie McConnell-Serio, former professional basketball player, current coach
- Kerry McCoy, two-time U.S. Olympian in wrestling; current coach of Stanford University wrestling
- O. J. McDuffie, former NFL wide receiver
- Irish McIlveen, Major League Baseball outfielder
- Kareem McKenzie, NFL offensive lineman
- John McNulty, wide receivers coach, Arizona Cardinals
- Matt Millen, former professional football player, former president of the Detroit Lions
- Mike Missanelli, host of The Mike Missanelli Show on 97.5 The Fanatic Philadelphia sports talk radio station
- Lenny Moore, former NFL running back
- Bob Mrosko, NFL player
- Mike Munchak, Pro Football Hall of Fame offensive guard, former Tennessee Titans head coach, current Pittsburgh Steelers offensive line coach
- Danny Musser, Major League Baseball third baseman
- Alyssa Naeher, professional women's soccer player, United States Women's National Soccer Team, Chicago Red Stars
- Stephen Nedoroscik, two-time Olympic bronze medalist in men's gymnastics, placed fourth on Season 33 of Dancing with the Stars
- Jim O'Hora, former football player, football coach
- Jordan Ott, head coach of the Phoenix Suns
- Phil Page, Major League Baseball player, coach, manager and scout
- Micah Parsons, NFL linebacker for Green Bay Packers
- Paul Pasqualoni, defensive line coach, Dallas Cowboys; former Syracuse head coach
- Darren Perry, former professional football player; current safeties coach, Green Bay Packers
- Cumberland Posey, founded the Homestead Grays in 1912
- Paul Posluszny, NFL linebacker for the Jacksonville Jaguars
- Eldon Price, university basketball coach and other positions; 19 years with Penn State's Beaver campus, two years as director of Basketball Operations at Penn State University
- Andrew Quarless, tight end on the Super Bowl XLV Champion Green Bay Packers
- Allen Robinson, NFL player, Jacksonville Jaguars
- Hatch Rosdahl, defensive lineman for the 1966 AFL champion Kansas City Chiefs
- Allen Rosenberg, rower and rowing coach
- Ed Ruth, three-time NCAA collegiate wrestling champion, professional mixed martial artist, currently for Bellator MMA
- Miles Sanders, NFL running back
- Jon Sandusky, director of player personnel, Cleveland Browns
- Mike Scioscia, former Major League Baseball catcher and current manager
- Chad Severs, professional soccer player
- Bud Sharpe, former Major League Baseball player
- Jack Sherry, captain of the 1954 Final Four Team
- Alan Strange, former Major League Baseball player
- Bill Stuart, Major League Baseball player
- Barclay Tagg, Kentucky Derby-winning Thoroughbred race horse trainer
- Kevin Tan, Olympic bronze medalist (gymnastics, team)
- David Taylor, 4× state champion wrestler, 2× NCAA champion
- Joe Tepsic, Major League Baseball outfielder
- Myles Thomas, former Major League Baseball player
- Wallace Triplett, former NFL running back; first African-American draftee to play in the NFL
- Kristal Uzelac, former U.S. Olympian
- Russ Van Atta, former Major League Baseball pitcher
- Qudus Wahab (born 2000), basketball player for Maccabi Ashdod of the Israeli Basketball Premier League
- John Montgomery Ward, former Major League Baseball player, manager, and executive
- Haleigh Washington, US Olympic gold medalist in women's volleyball
- Mike Watkins (born 1995), basketball player for Hapoel Haifa in the Israeli Basketball Premier League
- Tiffany Weimer, professional soccer player for the FC Gold Pride in the WPS
- Trevor Williams, football player

== See also ==
- List of people from State College, Pennsylvania
- List of people from Pennsylvania
