= Externally oriented planning =

Externally oriented planning

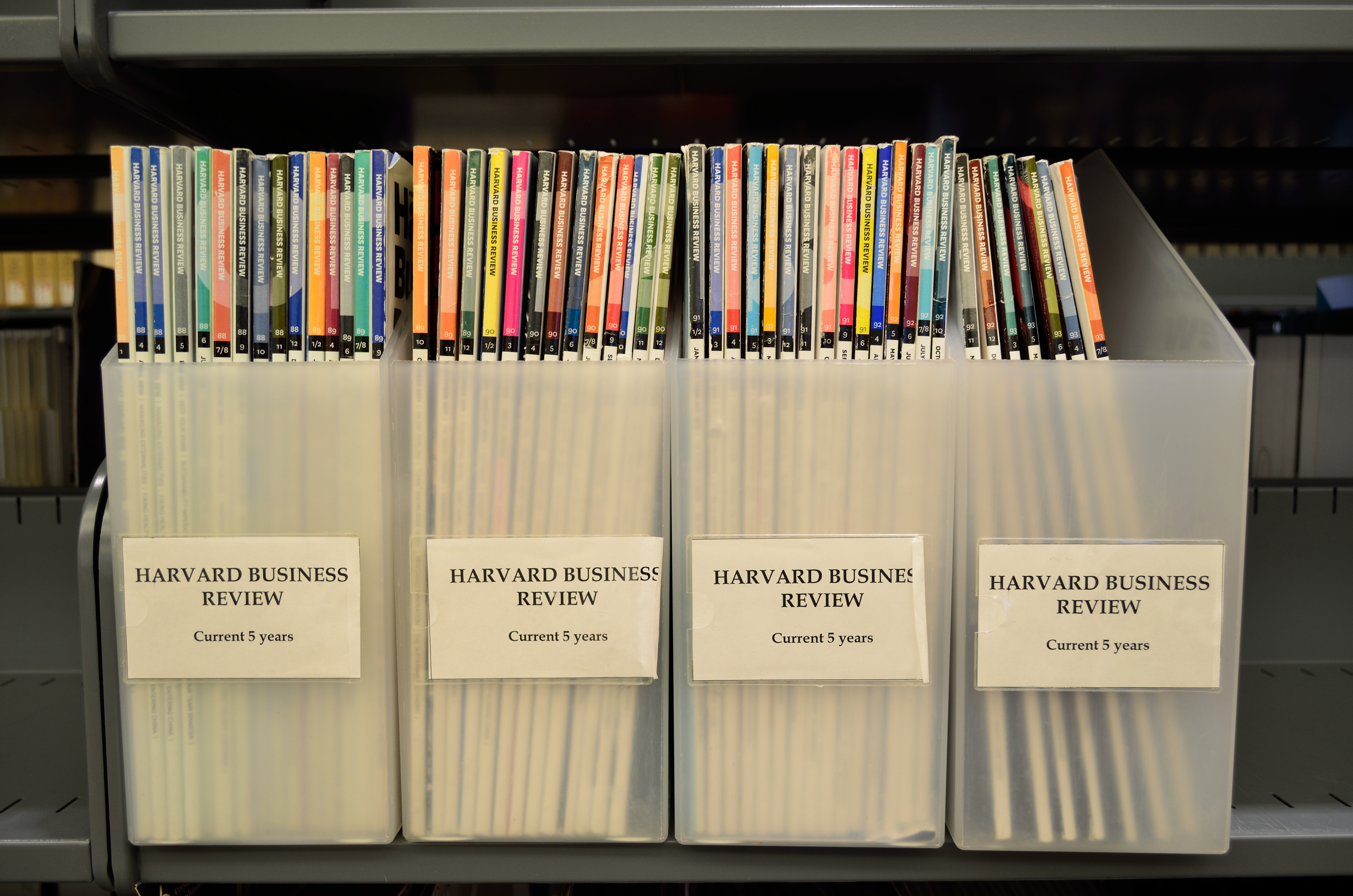
Harvard Business Review

Externally oriented planning is the third out of four discrete phases of the planning process, according to Gluck, Kaufman and Walleck's article published by Harvard Business Review in July 1980. A company may have previously worked through the "financial" and "forecast-based" planning phases before entering the "externally oriented" phase. Their model then has a fourth "strategic management" phase.

== Overview ==
- It could be equivalent to the strategic planning concept: to increase responsiveness to markets and competition by trying to think strategically.
- It seeks the understanding of the basic market elements that can be affected by rapid change drivers.
- It is mainly an outward focus on competitors, customers and suppliers. The analysis of competitors' production costs, manufacturing facilities and industrial commodities could make the difference at the time when the company puts them in comparison with their own.
- Lower-level staff members may make decisions when financial and forecast-based planning phases are in progress. However, in phase three decisions fully rely on managerial skills.
- With externally oriented planning, several options and actions may be at the disposal of the company. Managers cannot control every important decision, and the strategic business unit (SBU) concept could be put into action.
- The externally oriented planning is used to search for untapped or emerging market opportunities.
- From the point of view of an objective outsider, managers compare and contrast product offerings between those of their own companies and those of the competitors.

== The SBU point of view ==
Raymond E. Miles was a professor emeritus and former dean of the Walter A. Haas School of Business, University of California, Berkeley. He received his Ph.D. in Organizational Behavior and Industrial Relations from Stanford.

Charles C. Snow was the Mellon Foundation Professor of Business Administration and chairman of the Department of Management and Organization at Penn State’s Smeal College of Business. He had research and consulting experience in both the formulation and implementation of business strategies.

In 1978, Miles and Snow released their book Organizational Strategy, Structure, and Process.

In 1992, the Strategic Management Journal published a paper that analyzed the concept of strategic business units (SBUs) by taking into consideration the premises of Miles and Snow. SBUs are groups or subunits of related businesses which are part of a single corporation. They are created to decentralize the decision-making process as conditions of high variability and uncertainty may appear. Thereby, timely and appropriate local decision-making occurs.

For instance, an externally oriented SBU could be one that is unconstrained by corporate dictates (has relative freedom) to enter and leave markets in a timely manner. This externally oriented SBU has two distinctive characteristics: market awareness and responsiveness. Thus, this SBU may acquire considerable and unique information of the outside to process its own requirements.

An externally oriented SBU may not share the same planning process of the corporate management if it wants to enhance its performance. This basically means that this SBU's profits and market share are positively associated with the own control of strategic planning.

Besides this SBU way to understand the externally oriented planning, there is the basic conclusion that phase three of the planning process has the following elements for enterprises and private organizations in general:

- Rather than static, resource allocation is dynamic. This approach makes the company able to change customers' buying criteria or redefine the market itself in order to succeed within it.
- Rather than deterministic, plans are adaptive. There is not a standard strategy. Instead, the company aims to discover new ways of defining and satisfying customer needs, new products and services, and new ways of competing more effectively.
- Externally oriented strategies tend to be unrecognizable as a threat for the competition until after they have taken effect.
