= Willaman =

Willaman is a surname and is derived from William. Notable people with the surname include:

- Sam Willaman (1890–1935), American football player and coach
- Verne M. Willaman (1928–2012), American business executive and philanthropist
