= American Journal of Education =

- Discipline: Education
- Language: English
- Edited by: Gerald LeTendre, Dana L. Mitra

Publication details
- Former name(s): School Review
- History: 1893–present
- Publisher: University of Chicago Press for the Penn State College of Education Department of Education Policy Studies (United States)
- Frequency: Quarterly
- Impact factor: 1.333 (2017)

Standard abbreviations
- ISO 4: Am. J. Educ.

Indexing
- ISSN: 0195-6744 (print); 1549-6511 (web)
- LCCN: 80640603
- JSTOR: 01956744
- OCLC no.: 5585126

Links
- Journal homepage

The American Journal of Education seeks to bridge and integrate the intellectual, methodological, and substantive diversity of educational scholarship and to encourage a vigorous dialogue between educational scholars and policy makers. It publishes empirical research, from a wide range of traditions, that contribute to the development of knowledge across the broad field of education.
