= Wesley Donahue =

American engineer, entrepreneur, academic, and author

Wesley E. Donahue
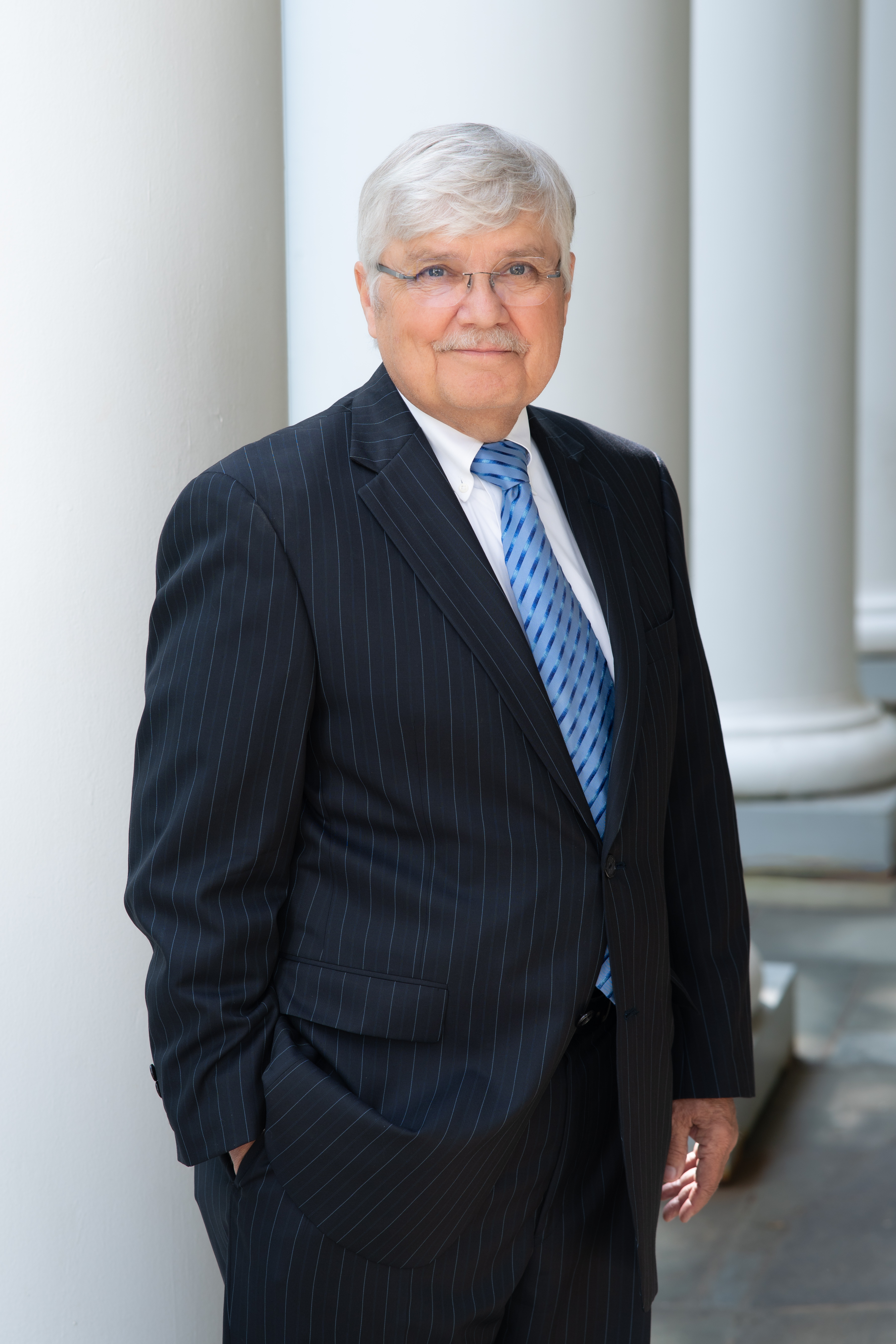
- Occupations: Engineer, entrepreneur, academic, and author

Academic background
- Education: Pennsylvania State University (BS); Clarion University (MBA); Penn State College of Education (PhD)
- Thesis: [ProQuest 304316564 A descriptive analysis of the perceived importance of leadership competencies to practicing electrical engineers in Central Pennsylvania] (1996)

Academic work
- Institutions: Penn State College of Education

Wesley E. Donahue is an American engineer, entrepreneur, academic, and author. He is a professor of Workforce development in the Department of Learning and Performance Systems at the Pennsylvania State University.

Donahue is most known for his work in competency modeling, with a focus on leadership development areas. He is the author of over 50 competency-based books and workbooks including Boosting Employee Motivation and Engagement: A Competency-Based Approach to Increasing Employee Performance by Focusing on the Work Climate, Developing Strategies to Retain Talent : A Competency-Based Approach for Building a Positive and Inclusive Workplace Culture, and Creating In-House Sales Training and Development Programs: A Competency-Based Approach to Building Sales Ability.

== Education ==
Donahue obtained his bachelor's degree in engineering from the Pennsylvania State University in 1972. He received his MBA in Finance Emphasis from Clarion University in 1981 and completed his Doctoral degree in Workforce Education and Development from the Penn State College of Education in 1996 with the subject of his doctoral dissertation revolving around identifying and defining the key leadership competencies required for engineers.

== Career ==
Since 1988 Donahue has been a faculty member and administrator at the Pennsylvania State University. Most recently he has been a professor of education at the Penn State College of Education's Department of Learning and Performance Systems.

As of 2014 Donahue leads an online graduate degree program in Organization Development and Change offered through Penn State World Campus.

In 1987 he co-founded and served as an Executive Vice President of Leffler Systems of New Jersey while concurrently collaborating with Michael Gigliotti & Associates and providing consulting services to the packaging industry until 1995.

In 1987 he established and now leads Centrestar, a firm that works in competency-based short courses and workbooks for people looking to advance their careers. He is the Chair of the Ferguson Township Industrial & Commercial Development Authority.

== Research ==
Donahue's research on leadership development, professional development, and technology-enhanced blended learning has won him the 2004 Penn State Continuing Education Leadership Award. He has authored numerous publications spanning the areas of collaborative learning, online education, professional development, and problem-solving including articles in peer-reviewed journals, book chapters, books, and workbooks.

=== Competency and leadership development ===
In 2004 he started a series of competency-based online micro-learning courses employing e-learning technology and active learning techniques. In 2010, he was part of a team that conducted a psychometric evaluation of his Leadership Competency Inventory (LCI) by conducting various tests, including item‐total correlations, Cronbach's alpha coefficients, exploratory factor analysis, and confirmatory factor analysis, and identified the factors accounting for the variation in the results, along with establishing the appropriateness regarding the model fit of the four latent factors or competency clusters of the LCI. In his further research, he updated the LCI to include a fifth competency cluster in 2012 to align with the U.S. Department of Labor's Competency Model Clearinghouse and the Occupational Network (O-Net) competency initiatives.

=== Effective team building ===
In 2015 Donahue developed and studied the Organization Development (OD) Effectiveness Model, an approach to change management that emphasized building wisdom, incorporating constructive feedback, and learning from other disciplines to facilitate long-lasting, positive change in organizations. His research efforts directed on how innovation leaders can assess, design, and implement a new organizational culture that supports continuous innovation and sustainable growth stressed the need for innovation leaders to aim for sustained competitive advantage by creating new roles, promoting high performance, and implementing innovation-focused employee reward systems. While exploring the concept of followership, the different types of followers, and the traits that make a follower successful, he highlighted the role of interpersonal skills, including but not limited to active listening, transparent communication, and seeking help when required, and stressed the importance of innovation leaders fostering and sustaining productive relationships with their subordinates by offering constructive feedback and acknowledging their contributions.

=== Sales optimization ===
Donahue proposed a 5-S consulting approach to sales featuring elements like Strengths, Situations, Solutions, Success, and Support. The study highlighted the significance of comprehending both the unique capabilities of individuals and organizations, as well as the significance of cultivating strong client relationships while taking into account situational factors and executing solutions through collaborative efforts to achieve success. Focusing his research efforts on developing internal programs for training and enhancing sales skills, his book Creating In-House Sales Training and Development Programs: A Competency-Based Approach to Building Sales Ability presented a framework and adaptable methodology for fulfilling the organizational requirement of proficiently trained sales personnel by incorporating feedback from accomplished sales professionals.

== Awards and honors ==
- 2004 – Penn State Continuing Education Leadership Award, Pennsylvania State University
- 2021 – Gold, Silver, and Bronze Book Award Winner, Global Book Awards
- 2022 – Gold, Silver, and Bronze Book Award Winner, Global Book Awards
- 2023 – Gold, Silver, and Bronze Award Winner, Global Book Awards
- 2024 – Gold, Silver, and Bronze Award Winner, Global Book Awards
- 2025 – Gold, Silver, and Bronze Award Winner, Global Book Awards

== Bibliography ==
Donahue has authored, co-authored, edited, or co-edited a collection of books, book chapters, articles, and over 100 workbooks.

=== Selected books ===
- Creating In-House Sales Development Programs: A Competency-Based Approach to Building Sales Ability. (2002) ISBN 978-1-56720-465-0
- Creating In-House Sales Development Programs: A Competency-Based Approach to Building Sales Ability. (2003) ISBN 979-8-5945-7536-3
- Building Leadership Competence: A Competency-Based Approach to Building Leadership Ability. (2018) ISBN 978-1-9808-1883-0
- Unlocking Lean Six Sigma: A Competency-Based Approach to Applying Continuous Process Improvement Principles and Best Practices. (2021) ISBN 979-8-5945-7536-3
- Developing Effective Leadership in Organizations: A Practical Guidebook for Professional Development. (2022) ISBN 979-8-218-03602-7
- Mastering Project Management: Planning for Performance: Competency-Based Guidebook Focused on Technical Project Management. (2023) ISBN 979-8-3728-7019-2
- Mastering Project Management: Results Through People: Competency-Based Guidebook Focused on Project Leadership. (2023) ISBN 979-8-3728-7117-5
- Mastering Project Management: Controlling Time, Money, and Risk: Competency-Based Guidebook Focused on Project Business Management. (2023) ISBN 979-8-3728-7143-4

=== Selected book chapters ===
- Donahue, W.E. & Park, J.E. (2004). The 5-S consulting approach to sales. In Linking training to performance (pp. 63–71). Community College Press.
- Park, J. G., & Donahue, W. E. (2018). Building a culture of continuous innovation. In Innovation leadership (pp. 44–51). Routledge.
- Macko, P., & Donahue, W. E. (2018). Innovation leaders and followership. In Innovation Leadership (pp. 29–35). Routledge.
- Rothwell, William J.; Sullivan, Roland L.; Kim, Taesung; Park, Jong Gyu; Donahue, Wesley E. (2015). "Change Process and Models". In Rothwell, William J.; Stavros, Jacqueline M.; Sullivan, Roland L. (eds.). Practicing Organization Development: Leading Transformation and Change. John Wiley & Sons. pp. 42–59. ISBN 978-1-118-94771-5.

=== Selected articles ===
- Joon Yoon, Hyung; Hoon Song, Ji; Donahue, Wesley E.; Woodley, Katheryn K. (September 2010). "Leadership competency inventory: A systematic process of developing and validating a leadership competency scale". Journal of Leadership Studies. 4 (3): 39–50. doi:10.1002/jls.20176.
