= Developmental Psychology (journal) =

- Discipline: Developmental psychology
- Language: English
- Edited by: Koraly Pérez-Edgar

Publication details
- History: Since 1969
- Publisher: American Psychological Association (United States)
- Frequency: Monthly
- Impact factor: 3.1 (2024)

Standard abbreviations
- ISO 4: Dev. Psychol.

Indexing
- CODEN: DEVPA9
- ISSN: 0012-1649 (print); 1939-0599 (web)
- LCCN: 77235958
- OCLC no.: 01566542

Links
- Journal homepage; Online access

Developmental Psychology is a peer-reviewed academic journal published by the American Psychological Association covering research in developmental psychology. Publishing formats are research articles, reviews, and theoretical or methodological articles. The current editor-in-chief is Koraly Pérez-Edgar (The Pennsylvania State University).

The journal has implemented the Transparency and Openness Promotion guidelines that provide structure to research planning and reporting and aim to make research more transparent, accessible, and reproducible.

== History ==
The journal was established in 1969, with Boyd R. McCandless (Emory University) as founding editor-in-chief.

== Abstracting and indexing ==
The journal is indexed by the following services:

- Academic Search
- CAB Abstracts
- Criminal Justice Abstracts
- Current Contents/Social & Behavioral Sciences
- Global Health
- MEDLINE/PubMed
- PsycINFO
- Scopus
- Social Sciences Citation Index

According to the Journal Citation Reports, the journal has a 2024 impact factor of 3.1.
