= Sophia Wisniewska =

American academic

- Born: 1951 or 1952 (age 74–75)
- Education: Pennsylvania State University; Bryn Mawr College

Sophia Wisniewska is a university administrator and a former chancellor of University of South Florida St. Petersburg and Pennsylvania State Brandywine. Earlier in her career, she worked for her alma mater, Pennsylvania State University, and later served as the dean of Temple University Ambler.

== Early life and education ==
Sophia Wisniewska was born in a small town 100 miles west of Warsaw, Poland. In 1962, her family moved to Manayunk, Philadelphia, Pennsylvania. She held several different jobs in her early years, such as helping her mother to make paper bags, working at a pharmacy, and working as an administrative assistant. Wisniewska learned English as a second language in school. She graduated from Philadelphia High School for Girls, a public magnet school for girls, as the first of her family to finish high school. While in college, she worked as a peer counselor. She received bachelor's degrees in Russian and in history from Pennsylvania State University. Later, she earned a master's degree and a Ph.D. in Russian and a Ph.D. in second language acquisition from Bryn Mawr College, where she also taught graduate courses. She is fluent in Russian and Polish, and proficient in French and German.

== Career ==
Wisniewska began her career at her alma mater, Pennsylvania State University, and held several administrative positions at various Pennsylvania State University campuses throughout her early career. She later served as the dean for Temple University Ambler. During her tenure, she was recognized by March of Dimes' "Salute to Women of Achievement" in 2000 for her community contributions and fundraising efforts. In 2005, she became the chancellor of Pennsylvania State Brandywine, where she formed a strategic plan. She also expanded the university's academic programs and transitioned the university from a commuter to residential school. Wisniewska left her position at Pennsylvania State Brandywine in 2013 to become the chancellor for the University of South Florida St. Petersburg (USFSP). During her time at USFSP, Wisniewska was credited by the Tampa Bay Business Journal for implementing a "durable strategic plan". She also acquired a $10 million grant, the largest gift in the history of the university, toward the naming of the Kate Tiedemann College of Business.

Wisniewska left her position at USFSP after a significant email miscommunication between her and the USF System President Judy Genshaft regarding student evacuations and the closing of campus during Hurricane Irma in 2017. In response to Genshaft's request that she resign, Wisniewska defended her actions, stating she had advocated for an earlier campus closing, but it was denied. She resigned from her position as chancellor but in April 2019, filed a lawsuit against Genshaft and USFSP for breach of contract claiming defamatory information was released to media outlets after her resignation.

In addition to her role at USFSP, Wisniewska served on Widener University's board of trustees from 2014 to 2015. She also served on the Chester Higher Education Council, a nonprofit organization created by university presidents of Delaware County, Pennsylvania. Wisniewska co-chaired the establishment of the St. Petersburg Innovation District Board, and served as the president of the organization in 2017. She served on the St. Petersburg Chamber of Commerce.

== Personal life ==
Wisniewska resides in California, as of May 2019. She enjoys collecting art, particularly from Polish artists, as well as cooking and reading. Wisniewska is a self-described Pink Floyd enthusiast. She has two younger sisters and two older brothers.

== See also ==
- List of Bryn Mawr College people
- List of Pennsylvania State University people
- List of Temple University people
