= James T. Harris III =

President of the University of San Diego

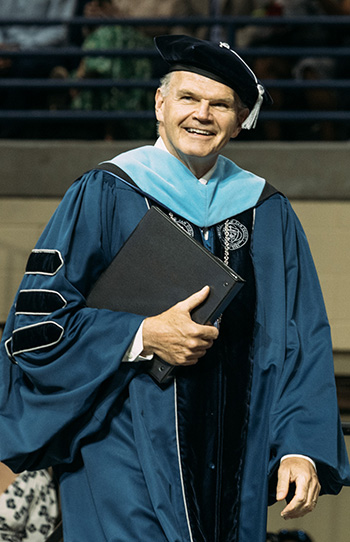

4th President of the University of San Diego
- Incumbent
- Assumed office August 1, 2015

Personal details
- Education: Bachelor's Degree from University of Toledo, Master of Education from Edinboro University, D.Ed. from Pennsylvania State University

James T. Harris III is the fourth and current president of the University of San Diego (USD) and is president emeritus of Widener University, where he served from 2002-2015. He previously served as president of Defiance College (1994-2002), and was named one of the top 50 character-building presidents in the United States by the John Templeton Foundation. Harris was named the top sitting college president in 2024 based on a study by the American Enterprise Institute.

== Career ==
While Harris served at Defiance, the College received the largest gift in its history when the McMaster family gave Defiance $6 million to establish the McMaster School for the Advancement of Humanity.

Under Harris' leadership, Widener University achieved national recognition from Newsweek as one of the nation's top 25 service-learning schools, a "Best College to Work For" by The Chronicle of Higher Education and among the "Top 25 Most Underrated Colleges in America" by Business Insider. Widener University granted Harris the title of president emeritus in 2015 and named its newest residence hall Harris Hall in his honor.

Harris was also Vice President at Wright State University in Dayton, Ohio, and the College of Mount St. Joseph in Cincinnati, Ohio. Harris started his career teaching social science at Central Catholic High School in Toledo, Ohio.

During Harris' time as president, USD has been recognized as one of the top schools nationally for being a “best run college” and having the “best quality of life” by the Princeton Review, a top five program nationally for promoting public service by Washington Monthly, and has received additional recognition for its sustainability efforts and work to enhance diversity and inclusion. In 2024, USD received the largest gift in its history to support advancements in STEM education and research.

Harris, a first-generation college student, received his D.Ed. from Pennsylvania State University in 1988. In 2003 he was named an alumni fellow by the alumni association and in 2013 a distinguished alumni by the university's board of trustees, the highest honor given a graduate of Penn State.. He has also received degrees from Edinboro University and the University of Toledo. Both Edinboro and Toledo have named him a distinguished alumni.

Harris is nationally recognized for his work in civic engagement. In 2011 he was awarded the Chief Executive leadership award by the Council for the Advancement and Support of Education for District II, and received the award again in 2025 for District VII. He has been elected to serve on multiple national and state boards holding many leadership positions including serving as chair of the Board of Directors for the Council for the Advancement and Support of Education, and American Council on Education Commission on the Advancement of Racial and Ethnic Equity (2006-2009). Examples of leadership roles he held earlier in his career include being elected as the Chair of the Association of Independent Colleges and Universities of Pennsylvania, Chair of Pennsylvania Campus Compact and Vice Chair of the national Campus Compact Board. Harris is a member of the LEAD California (formerly California Campus Compact) Board, previously serving as chair.

Harris served as Vice Chair of the NCAA Division I President's Council, and the Chair of the NCAA Division III President's Council earlier in his career.

Harris served as a member of the MDP faculty at Harvard University from 2001-2019. He is a current faculty member for the Association of Governing Boards (AGB) Institute for Leadership and Governance in Higher Education.

He is the author of multiple scholarly articles on higher education and in 2013 he co-authored a book on Academic Leadership and Governance, with a second edition in 2022. He is a faculty member for the Association of Governing Boards (AGB) Institute for Leadership and Governance in Higher Education.

Harris has written a number of opinion pieces and guest essays. In an opinion piece published in USA Today in 2017, he discussed the history of international students on U.S. campuses and the valuable insights they bring to learning and research. In 2023 he authored a piece about serving as a university president in Inside Higher Ed where he discussed his regular walks with students and USD community members. He authored an opinion piece in The New York Times in 2025 entitled "Big Football is ruining College Sports," where he argues that the Power Four schools should go their own way to give other sports a chance to shine.

On September 29, 2026, Harris publicly announced that he would be stepping down as president of USD at the end of the 2026-27 academic year, though he plans to remain at USD as a faculty member following a sabbatical.

== Personal life ==
Harris has been married to Mary Catherine Harris (née Kurdila) for over forty years and they have two sons; Zachary and Braden, both USD graduates. Harris is a Catholic.

== Bibliography ==
2023

- Michael Lovette-Colyer, James T. Harris III (2023). "A Synodal Process for Revising the Mission of a Contemporary Catholic University". Journal of Catholic Higher Education (Abstract). 41 (2).

2022

- James T. Harris, Jason E. Lane, Jeffrey C. Sun, Gail F. Baker (2022). Academic Leadership and Governance of Higher Education (2 ed.). New York: Routledge. ISBN 978-1-64267-409-5.

2013

- James T. Harris III, Marcine Pickron-Davis (2013-06-18). "From Gates to Engagement: A Ten-Year Retrospective of Widener University's Journey to Reclaim Its Soul and Fulfill Its Mission as a Leading Metropolitan University". Journal of Higher Education Outreach and Engagement (Abstract). 17 (3).

2005

- James T. Harris III (2005-01-13). "Higher Education, College Rankings and Access for Lower-Income Students". Black Issues in Higher Education (Abstract). 21 (24): 106. ERIC EJ709779.

2003

- Harris III, James T.; Ira Harkavy (July–August 2003). "Colleges, Universities and Communities Advancing Social and Economic Justice" (PDF). Journal of Poverty Law and Policy. Democracy Collaborative (community-wealth.org): 149–153. Archived from the original (PDF) on 2007-10-08.

2002

- James T. Harris III (2002-11-15). "Putting Up the President" (Abstract). The Chronicle of Higher Education. 49 (12). The Chronicle of Higher Education. Note: Premium article requiring payment for full-text access
