= Frank Smeal =

Frank P. Smeal
- Born: August 7, 1918; Sykesville, Pennsylvania
- Died: April 8, 2003 (aged 84); Rumson, New Jersey
- Citizenship: United States
- Education: Pennsylvania State University, Harvard University, New York University
- Occupation(s): Financial services executive, philanthropist
- Spouse: Mary Jean Popp
- Children: Mary Margaret "Maggi" Smeal, M.D. Henry "Hank" F. Smeal

Frank Paul Smeal (August 7, 1918 – April 8, 2003) was a partner of the Goldman Sachs Group of New York City and philanthropist.

== Early life and education ==
Smeal was born in Sykesville, Pennsylvania in rural Jefferson County, the son of a coal miner, and credited his mother, Mary, for inspiring him to seek a college degree. It took five years of working part-time as a "soda jerk" and a mortgage on his parents' home before he could achieve his goal of a college education. To get there, he had to hitchhike five miles a day. He had said that he went to college to stay out of the mines where his father had worked. "That's why Penn State is my first love after my wife and family. It gave me the education I needed."

Smeal was a 1942 Phi Beta Kappa graduate in economics at the Pennsylvania State University, and went on to earn a Master's in Business Administration from Harvard University in 1947 and a law degree from New York University in 1952.

== Career ==
A limited partner of Goldman, Sachs & Co., Smeal spent his 38-year career on Wall Street as an expert in the municipal bond market. As executive vice president and treasurer at Morgan Guaranty Trust co., he was instrumental in counseling New York City through its 1975–76 fiscal crisis. He became a partner and member of the senior management committee of Goldman Sachs in 1977 and retired in 1985.

Frank was a past-president of the Municipal Bond Club of New York and former Chairman of the Government and Federal Agencies Securities Committee of Public Securities Association. He was treasurer of the United Chapters of Phi Beta Kappa and of the Phi Beta Kappa Foundation. Frank also served as Chairman of the Greater New York Councils of Boy Scouts of America, Chairman of the Penn State Development Councils, and Chairman of the Citizens Budget Commission, New York, NY. He was also a member of the Board of the Mount Nittany Society.

== Philanthropy ==
His philanthropic support of Penn State also extended to endowing a fellowship in business administration, a faculty chair in literary theory and comparative criticism, a creative writing award and a graduate assistantship in botany and plant pathology. In 1989, he and his wife, Mary Jean, donated $10 million to Pennsylvania State University, which renamed the Smeal College of Business in their honor.

== Personal life ==
Smeal and his wife, the former Mary Jean Popp of State College, Pennsylvania, had two children Mary Margaret and Henry. He died Tuesday, April 8, 2003, at his home in Rumson, New Jersey after a long illness, at the age of 84.
