= Penn State College of Education =

University college

College of Education
- Type: Public
- Established: 1923
- Dean: Gwendolyn M. Lloyd
- Undergraduates: 2,282
- Postgraduates: 989
- Location: University Park, Pennsylvania, U.S.
- Campus: University Park, Pennsylvania, U.S.
- Website: ed.psu.edu

The College of Education is one of 15 colleges at The Pennsylvania State University, located in University Park, Pennsylvania. It houses the departments of Curriculum and Instruction, Education Policy Studies, Learning and Performance Systems, and Educational Psychology, Counseling, and Special Education. Almost 2,300 undergraduate students, and nearly 1,000 graduate students are enrolled in its 7 undergraduate and 16 graduate degree programs. The college is housed in four buildings: Chambers, Rackley, Keller, and CEDAR Buildings.

The workforce Education and Development program originated in 1920 in the School of Engineering and was called the Department of Industrial Education.

The College of Education is home to many academic journals, research centers and institutes, student organizations, and other academic programs.

The college has an endowment worth more than $41.2 million. Undergraduate students receive more than $1.89 million in College and University scholarships each year. The college received $8 million in research grants and contracts in 2012-13.

The mission of the College of Education is "to deepen and extend knowledge about the formation and utilization of human capabilities."

== History ==
University president John Martin Thomas created the School of Education on June 11, 1923, with Will G. Chambers as its first dean. At that time, it consisted of five departments — Home Economics, Education and Psychology, Agricultural Education, Industrial Education, and Nature Study — and had 359 students enrolled that first year. The first graduate programs began in 1930, and by 1938, the School of Education was the second largest college at the university. The American Indian Leadership Program began in 1971, as one of the first programs of its kind in the nation. David H. Monk was appointed as the dean of the College of Education in 1999. That same year, the College of Education offered its first World Campus master's program. The American Journal of Education came to the College in 2004.

== Programs and Initiatives ==
The College of Education has a number of programs that promote education in various settings.

=== American Indian Leadership program ===
The American Indian Leadership Program (AILP) is a graduate fellowship program for American Indians and Alaska Natives that has as its purpose "the training of qualified leaders for service to Indian nations." Begun in 1970, the AILP is the longest-running program of its kind. It has graduated more than 200 students over its 40 years.

=== Professional Development Schools ===
Professional Development Schools (PDS) is a yearlong internship program in connection with the State College Area School District. Education students are matched with teacher mentors to gain classroom experience as they teach together throughout a school year. This program has been recognized with many awards, including the 2009 National Association for Professional Development Schools Award for Exemplary Professional Development School Achievement.

=== Cedar Clinic ===
The Cedar Clinic is a counseling service available to all Penn State students for personal and educational concerns. The Cedar Clinic is run by the Department of Educational Psychology, Counseling, and Special Education. In addition to providing unlimited free counseling services to the student body, the Cedar clinic also allows graduate students in counselor education to gain supervised clinical experience.

=== Humphrey Fellowship Program ===
The Humphrey Fellowship Program at Penn State is a year-long, non-degree academic program for mid-career professionals that seeks to develop leadership in education. Named for former Vice President Hubert H. Humphrey, this program is funded by the U.S. Department of State. Penn State is one of 13 participating universities.

=== Center for Science and the Schools ===
The Center for Science and the Schools (CSATS) is a center housed in the College of Education that aims to strengthen science education throughout Pennsylvania. CSATS links Penn State researchers to K-12 schools and helps them to develop and test teaching strategies that will improve education in the sciences. The CSATS Curriculum Center makes over 2000 titles of science teaching materials available to teachers.

=== Lifelink ===
Lifelink is a joint program between Penn State and the State College Area School District for college-aged SCASD students with disabilities. The program is intended to provide a transition from high school to adult life. These students attend college-level classes of their choosing at Penn State. They are accompanied by Penn State student mentors, who help them with classwork and spend time with them.

=== Student Teaching Abroad ===
The Penn State College of Education offers students an opportunity to teach in a foreign country with its student teaching abroad program. The short-term student teaching abroad option allows students to do both a traditional student teaching placement in Pennsylvania followed by an international placement in one of 16 countries: Australia, China, Costa Rica, Ecuador, England, India, Ireland, Italy, Japan, New Zealand, Norway, Russia, Scotland, Spain, Turkey, or Wales. Students spend 12 weeks in Pennsylvania and then travel to their host nation school for five to eight weeks.

=== Joint Law Degree program ===
Penn State's Dickinson School of Law and the College of Education combine to offer a combined degree in law and education. Relatively few schools offer joint degree programs with law and education. Penn State's program ranks among the nation's best.

== Research Centers and Institutes ==
The college is home to a number of research centers and institutes, including the following:

- CEDAR Clinic
- Center for Evaluation and Education Policy Analysis
- Center for Science and the Schools
- Center for the Study of Higher Education
- Center for the Study of Leadership in American Indian Education
- Center for the Study of Leadership and Ethics
- Center on Rural Education and Communities
- Goodling Institute for Research in Family Literacy
- Institute for Research in Training and Development
- Institute for the Study of Adult Literacy
- Interinstitutional Consortium for Indigenous Knowledge
- Pennsylvania School Study Council
- Regional Educational Lab Mid-Atlantic
- Vocational Education Professional Personnel Development Center
- Training Interdisciplinary Educational Scientists Program

== Academic Journals ==
College of Education faculty have editorial responsibilities for more than 30 major journals in education, including the following:

- American Journal of Distance Education
- American Journal of Education
- Augmentative and Alternative Communication
- The Career Development Quarterly
- Comparative Education Review
- e-Learn Magazine
- Girlhood Studies
- Higher Education in Review
- International Journal of Vocational Education and Training
- Journal of Counseling & Development
- Journal of Industrial Teacher Education
- Journal for Research in Mathematics Education
- Journal of Research in Rural Education
- Journal of Teacher Education
- Learning Disabilities Research & Practice
- Perspectives on the History of Higher Education
- Workforce Education Forum

== Rankings ==
In 2013, the U.S. News & World Report ranked the College of Education as a whole at 33rd in the nation. All of the College of Education's graduate programs appear ranked in the top 20 of their respective areas. These program rankings are as follows:

- Technical Teacher Education (Workforce Education)—#1
- Higher Education Administration—#3
- Rehabilitation Counseling—#4
- Administration/Supervision (Ed Leadership)—#7
- Education Policy—#9
- Student Counseling/Personnel Services—#11
- Secondary Education—#11
- Educational Psychology—#12
- Elementary Education—#13
- Special Education—#16

== Student organizations ==
- Adopt a School — This group of students interacts with students in area schools through tutoring, educational presentations, and mentoring experiences.
- Adult Literacy Training Corps — This organization seeks to facilitate awareness of and action for adult literacy in Centre County and to empower both adult students and Adult Literacy Tutoring Corps volunteers by offering opportunities for mutual learning, leadership, and service.
- College of Education Student Council — The College's Student Council provides an opportunity for all Education students to work together in strengthening the communication links between students, faculty, and administrators. While focusing on issues related to teacher preparation and education in general, the Council's activities include speakers, workshops, and social events.
- Council for Exceptional Children — The Council for Exceptional Children (CEC) is a national professional organization for individuals involved in the field of exceptional children.
- Education Policy Studies Student Association — The EPSSA promotes the development of students as scholars and future professionals in the fields of educational leadership, education theory and policy, American Indian leadership, and comparative and international education. This group provides a forum for support, discussions, scholarship, social networking, and professional development relating to all matters of K-12 education.
- The Future Educators Association - Multicultural Education Student Association (FEA-MESA) — FEA-MESA is a diverse group of students of various cultural, ethnic, and economic backgrounds within the College of Education.
- The Higher Education Student Association — HESA promotes student development as scholars and professionals and facilitates integration into the higher education program.
- International Education Student Association (IESA) — IESA promotes the development of students as scholars and future professionals in the field of comparative and international education.
- Pennsylvania Association for the Education of Young Children (PennAEYC) & National Association for the Education of Young Children (NAEYC) — NAEYC and the Central Pennsylvania Region of PennAEYC offer connections and professional development opportunities between college students and local programs and practitioners focusing on young children.
- Pennsylvania Council for the Social Studies (PCSS) & National Council for the Social Studies (NCSS) Society of Integrated Education — PCSS and NCSS promote quality Social Studies education from kindergarten to higher learning.
- Phi Delta Kappa (PDK) — PDK is a professional association primarily for full-time educators and graduate students in all areas of education, but undergraduate students are encouraged to attend PDK programs at Penn State. PDK strives to assist with the preparation and leadership of educators through relevant research, service and publications such as newsletters and the KAPPAN journal.
- Pi Lambda Theta (PLT) — PLT is an international honor society and professional association primarily for teacher candidates. It encourages leadership among future teachers and keeps members abreast of current trends in education by publishing newsletters and the Educational Horizons journal.
- Rehabilitation and Human Services Student Organization — This group is a mutually collaborative community of students who share a passion for making a difference in the lives of others. Students participate in social and educational opportunities; mentorship and involvement among faculty, alumni, staff, and students; networking opportunities to explore employment and graduate programs; and service-learning.
- Society of Integrated Education — This group matches education students to area school districts to conduct research.
- Society for the Study of Workforce and Economic Development — This group enhances the intellectual and collegiate climate in Workforce and Economic Development among the Penn State community.
- Student Advisory Forum — This advisory group discusses student issues in the College with the administration. The forum was started by Dean Monk.
- Student Affairs Student Organization (SASO) — SASO enhances the educational and professional experience of the College Student Affairs master's program students, past, present, and future.
- Student Pennsylvania State Education Association — This student group exists in affiliation with the Pennsylvania State Education Association as a way to further the professional growth of pre-service teachers.
- Vocational Industrial Clubs of America (VICA) — VICA is the national youth organization serving trade, industrial, technical, and health occupations students through activities emphasizing leadership, citizenship, and character development. VICA emphasizes respect for the dignity of work, high standards in trade ethics, workmanship, scholarship, and safety. Penn State's chapter is the Beta chapter.
- Office of Student Activities — The University's Office of Student Activities located in the 209 HUB-Robeson Center (863-4624) provides additional opportunities in leadership development and service activities for Education students.

== Alumni ==
The College of Education has approximately 56,000 alumni, many of whom are members of the College of Education Alumni Society.
