= Annika Sharma =

Indian-American author and podcaster

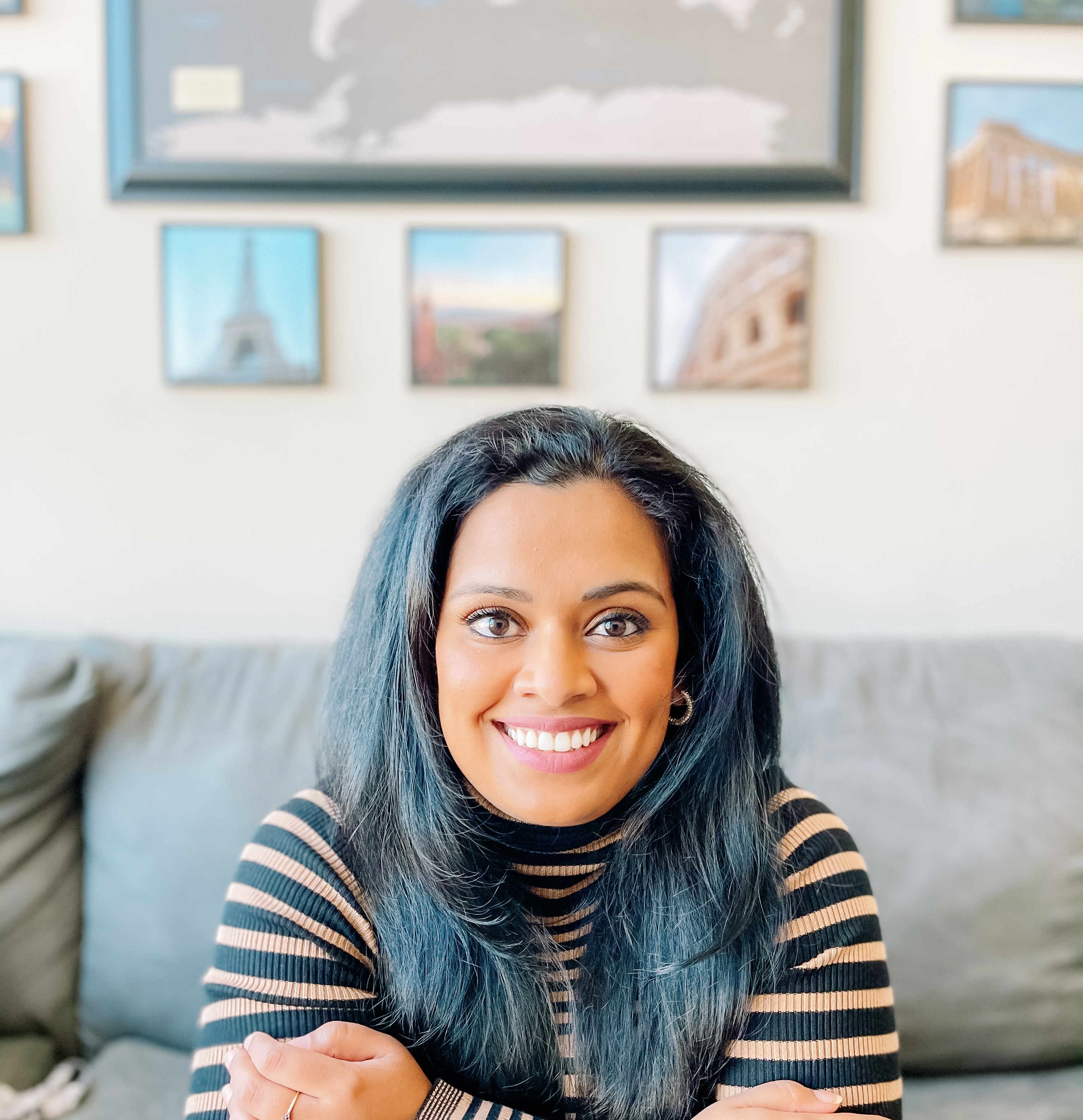
- Annika Sharma pic
- Occupations: author and podcaster.

Annika Sharma is an Indian-American author and podcaster.

== Career ==
Sharma earned degrees from Pennsylvania State University and George Washington University.

Sharma's first entry in the Chai Masala Club series, Love, Chai, and Other Four-Letter Words, was published in 2021. Keira Soleore wrote of the "charming characters in [Sharma's] memorable, not-to-be-missed novel of transcendent love, the promising start to her Chai Masala Club series" in a starred review for Booklist. Library Journal also gave the novel a starred review, wrote positively of the characters of the novel and noted, "This well-written contemporary romance features the familiar tropes of forbidden love and friends-to-lovers with characters from different backgrounds and cultures". Publishers Weekly called it "charming if formulaic," and continued, "while this predictably hits all the typical romance story beats, it distinguishes itself with relatable characters, a vibrant setting, ample, well-drawn Indian representation, and a delightful voice".

Publishers Weekly gave the second novel in the series, Sugar, Spice, and Can't Play Nice (2023), a mixed review: "Highly expositional and occasionally moralizing dialogue slows the pace, but there’s still plenty to enjoy. Conflict, couture, and courtship make this a pleasure". Kirkus Reviews found it "a cute romance burdened by family expectations". Library Journal called it "a strikingly vibrant love story for modern dreamers and hopeless romantics".

Sharma founded one of the largest South Asian podcasts, That Desi Spark (previously called The Woke Desi). She sold the show in 2024.

== Selected works ==
=== Chai Masala Club ===
1. Love, Chai, and Other Four-Letter Words. Sourcebooks Casablanca, 2021.
2. Sugar, Spice, and Can't Play Nice. Sourcebooks Casablanca, 2023.
