= Stuart Patton =

American dairy scientist

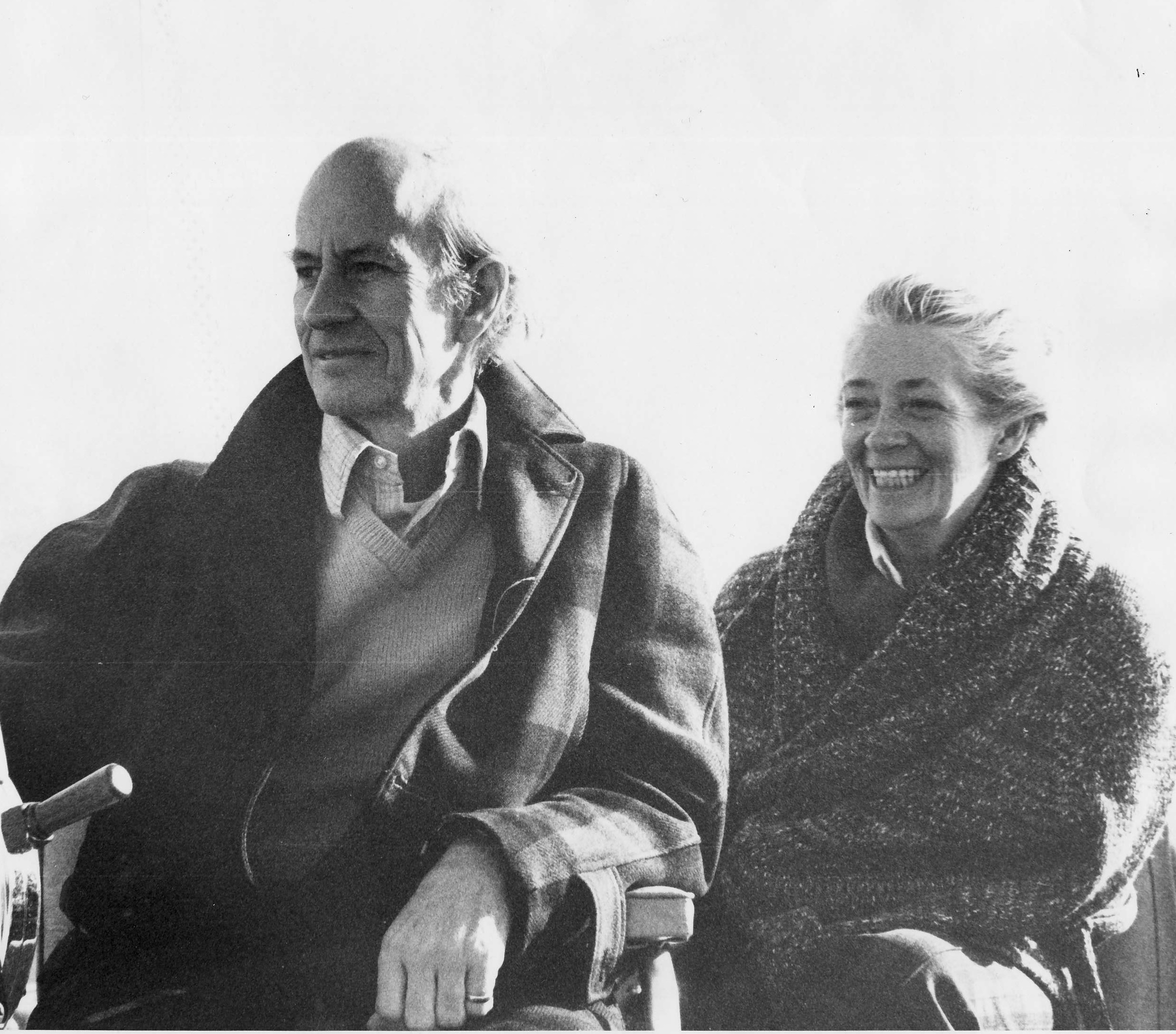
- Stuart Patton and wife, Colleen, in 1970.
- Born: Stuart Joseph Patton; November 2, 1920; Ebenezer, New York
- Died: October 9, 2017 (aged 96); La Jolla, California
- Education: Penn State, Ohio State University
- Known for: Pioneer of gas chromatography in flavor research and seminal contributions to the understanding of human lactation
- Spouse: Colleen Patton (m. 1945–2016)
- Children: 7
- Awards: Borden Award (1957), Bond Award (1973), Agricultural and Food Chemistry Award (1973), Senior Scientist Award, (1981), Macy-Gyorgy Award for Research in Human Milk Lactation (1997)
- Scientific career
- Fields: Dairy Science, Food Science
- Workplaces: Penn State, University of California, San Diego, San Diego State University
- Doctoral advisor: D. V. Josephson
- Notable students: Allen Day, Dave Force, Neil Walker, Takashi Sagabe, Herman Timmen, A.I. Vertanen

Stuart Joseph Patton (November 2, 1920 – October 9, 2017) was an American dairy scientist known for his research in the fields of milk chemistry and the biological processes that regulate milk synthesis in the mammary gland. He was professor of dairy science/food science at Pennsylvania State University from 1949 to 1980 and adjunct professor in the Department of Neurosciences, School of Medicine, University of California, San Diego, and in the School of Family Studies and Consumer Sciences at San Diego State University until his retirement in 2001.

== Life ==
Patton was born in Ebenezer, New York, to George Patton and Ina Neher Patton. He graduated from Radnor High School in Wayne, Pennsylvania, in 1938 and received his Bachelor of Science degree from Penn State University in 1943. He married Colleen Lavelle in 1945, to whose support in their 71-year marriage he often said he owed his success. They had seven children, four sons and three daughters. After serving as an ensign in the U.S. Navy during World War II, he pursued graduate work at Ohio State University, receiving his master's degree in 1947 and his Doctor of Philosophy in 1948, working under the direction of Donald V. Josephson. Their collaboration continued at Penn State, where both returned in 1948, Josephson as head of the Department of Dairy Husbandry and Patton as assistant professor. In 1966 Patton became the College of Agriculture's first Evan Pugh Professor. While at Penn State, Patton served as a consultant to The Borden Company (1952–72), the U. S. Department of Agriculture (1958≠61) and International Flavors and Fragrances, Inc. (1965–75), where his work resulted in three patents. Patton's collaboration with Andrew Benson, with whom he shared a common interest in the structure and function of the cell membrane, motivated his move to UCSD after his retirement from Penn State in 1980.

== Research ==
Some of Patton's earliest research in collaboration with D. V. Josephson revealed that a change in methionine in milk was responsible for the off flavor produced when milk is exposed to light. In other of his early work Patton discovered that malonic dialdehyde is a product of lipid oxidation and the basic reactant in the thiobarbituric acid and Kreis tests for lipid oxidation. One of the first to use gas chromatography, mass spectrometry and thin layer chromatography in flavor research, Patton proved, using these techniques, that methyl sulfide is a key component in the flavor of milk, methods his student Allen Day, who went on to become vice-president for research at IFF, put to good use. At Penn State, "in the 1960s and 1970s, Patton would lead a departmental redirection into lipid research with important insights on mammary gland milk fat synthesis,” but he attributed the turn in his research from the characterization of milk lipids to milk synthesis and secretions to Robert McCarthy. Patton's research in this area is summarized in Biomedical Aspects of Lactation. While lipid research continued to be a focus of Patton's investigations on the various expeditions he participated on with Andrew Benson, (for example, the importance of triglyceride in the salmon's heart function; the chemical characterization of unique lipids in marine animals), an investigation that demonstrated the high food value of the red tide organism (the phytoplankton bloom), remains under explored. While working in John O’Brien's lab in the Department of Neurosciences, School of Medicine, UCSD, with funding support from NIH, Patton began extensive work analyzing the nature of human milk, with special emphasis on its mucins. He discovered that the mucins MUC1 and MUC-X, which are transferred to the milk fat globule upon secretion, have greater size in human milk and therefore may carry greater protection against infections and injurious environmental agents. In the 55 years of his active research career Patton collaborated with more than 100 scientists from around the world, including with his twin sons, John and Richard, who both went on to successful careers in the sciences, each of them writing dissertations under colleagues of their father. And, coming full circle, in some of his final research he collaborated with R. V. Josephson, son of his first mentor at Penn State in the 1940s. A scholarship is named in honor of D. V. Josephson and Patton at Penn State, awarded to graduate students and faculty on a yearly rotating basis.

In addition to the textbook Patton co-wrote with R. Jenness (1959), Principles of Dairy Chemistry, New York and London), he addressed a broader audience in a Scientific American article “Milk” (1969, 221: 59–68) and in his final publication: Milk: Its Remarkable Contribution to Human Health and Well-being (2004, New York), a comprehensive treatment of its subject and advocacy for its benefits.

The Stuart Patton Auditorium in the Agricultural Sciences and Industries Building at Penn State is dedicated in his honor “for his inquisitive nature and skill in imparting knowledge; for his enthusiasm for science and uncompromising respect for peers.”

In 2018, Dr. Patton's colleague, Ian H. Mather, added this touching tribute to Patton in his article in the Journal of Dairy Science: "This review is dedicated to the memory of Stuart Patton (1920–2017), Evan Pugh Professor Emeritus, Pennsylvania State University, and colleague, friend, and unofficial mentor of the senior author (IHM). The footprints of Dr. Patton’s research are evident throughout the pages of this review" (article is Symposium Review: Intravital imaging of the lactating mammary gland in live mice reveals novel aspects of milk-lipid secretion

In a letter submitted in support of Patton's nomination as a fellow of the American Dairy Science Association in 2001, Dr. Ian Maher stated the following, "Dr. Patton's research is characterized by careful attention to experimental detail and a thorough knowledge of the literature. The discussion sections of his papers are always brimming with ideas, thought provoking and creative. A consistent feature of the work is novelty, whether it is a simple solution to a practical problem, or an inspirational idea that leads to new avenues of research. An example of the former is the simple but elegant method Dr. Patton devised to separate milk-fat globules from skim-milk components in a single step by density gradient centrifugation (Patton, S., and Huston, G.E. (1986) Lipids, 21, 170-174). An example of the latter is the introduction of bioactive compounds into the mammary gland by infusion through the streak canal (Patton, S. (1974) EBS Lett., 48, 85-87). This idea spawned a series of papers from several investigators on the cellular mechanism of milk secretion and opens up the possibility of genetically modifying the mammary gland by the in vivo transfection of mammary epithelial cells with recombinant DNA."

== Awards ==
- Borden Award (American Chemical Society) 1957
- Bond Award (American Oil Chemists’ Society) 1973
- Agricultural and Food Chemistry Award (American Chemical Society) 1973
- Senior Scientist Award (Alexander von Humboldt Foundation) 1981
- Macy-Gyorgy Award for Research in Human Milk and Lactation 1997
- Penn State Alumni Fellow Award 2001
- Penn State Distinguished Alumnus Award 2002
