= Leah Krubitzer =

American neuroscientist

- Education: Ph.D Vanderbilt University Psychology (Neuroscience), 1984-1989 B.S. Pennsylvania State University, SpeechPathology, High Honors, 1983

Leah Krubitzer is an American neuroscientist, Professor of Psychology at University of California, Davis, and head of the Laboratory of Evolutionary Neurobiology. Her research interests center on how complex brains in mammals (e.g., humans) evolve from simpler forms. To do this, she focuses on anatomical connections and electrophysiological characteristics of neurons in the neocortex (i.e., the part of the brain associated with perception, cognition, learning, and memory). Using comparative studies, she determines which features of the neocortex are shared by all mammals and how new features of the neocortex have evolved. This allows her to reconstruct evolutionary phylogenies of the neocortex together with their relationship to functional changes. Thus, her work aims to explain the diversity in mammalian behavioral and perceptual abilities by investigating how evolutionarily old developmental mechanisms constrain evolutionary change while also providing the variation needed for the evolution of the diversity of brains found in mammals.

She was a reviewer for the 2009 NIH Director's Pioneer Award.

== History ==
Krubitzer received a Bachelor of Science degree from Pennsylvania State University. She attended Vanderbilt University where she completed graduate school. She earned a PhD in Physiological Psychology. Upon completion of her PhD, Krubitzer moved to Australia for six years to study at the University of Queensland. During her time in Australia, she studied the neurobiology of different mammals. Two animals she studied most regularly were the extant monotremes, the spiny anteater and the duckbilled platypus. Krubitzer's research interests include the neuroanatomical, behavioral, and electrophysiological techniques used to study the neocortex. Krubitzer has been intrigued by how the neocortex has evolved over time and the ways in which is it organized within different types of mammals.

== Lab work and research ==
Krubitzer works on mammals studying the different anatomical connections in the neocortex, as well as the neurons present and their electrophysiological properties. The neocortex is an important part of the brain as it is responsible for functions such as learning and memory, cognition, and perception. Krubitzer and her team have gone down two different paths to research the evolution of the neocortex in mammals. Her lab has been focusing on studying cortical evolution and development, as well as, the parietal cortex.

Krubitzer and her team have decided to focus part of their research on studying the cortical evolution of the neocortex. It is known that the neocortex has the ability to adapt and change over time. This is an important feature that allows the brain function and connectivity to coordinate movements vital for an organism's survival in a specific environment. Krubitzer and her team used a variety of different rodents and squirrels to test their hypothesis. They hypothesized that the level of cortical activity organization would be directly correlated with the specific connections in the brain based on the environment that the particular animal was accustomed. Differences were found between the lab animals and wild caught animals as would be expected. Krubitzer varied the amounts of sensory stimuli that each test subject was exposed to early on in development. By doing this, she was able to track the organization of the cortex from early development on. One example of how she did this was altering the vision in an opossum in early development. Research found that when vision is lost early in development, other sensory systems will begin to take over that area and the cortex will re-organize itself to make up for the loss of this sensation.

The parietal cortex is another area of interest for Krubitzer. The parietal cortex allows us to coordinate movements between our eyes and our hands. This ability allows for smooth reaching movements, as well as, grasping. Past research has been done on Old and New World monkeys, as well as humans, to see how the parietal cortex functions in hand use. Imaging used on humans shows that there are similar cortical patterns shared across human and non-human primates, but the extent to which these pathways are used depends on the somatosensory organization and connectivity in the parietal cortex. Krubitzer and her team took this information and investigated a little deeper. Because humans have an opposable thumb, our ability to grip objects and reach for objects is much greater than monkeys. For this reason, the connectivity in the human parietal cortex is much more complex than that of a non-human primate. In Krubitzer's lab, her team investigated different areas of the parietal cortex in order to better pin point which part controls which motor movement. Krubitzer found that when one area of the cortex responsible for a certain motor movement is compromised, the rest of the cortex will reorganize itself to make up for the loss. This finding shows how the parietal cortex can rewire itself in order to maintain functional motor capabilities. Currently in the lab, Krubitzer and colleagues are testing a microchip that may be placed in the posterior parietal cortex of the brain to deactivate certain areas at a time. Using this technique, they are able to see how deactivation of a certain portion of the cortex impacts hand grasping and reaching in monkeys. This technique is performed while the monkeys are performing different manual tasks in order to see the action of the cortex live.

== Awards ==
Leah Krubitzer has won many awards for her time and dedication to her research and the field of science as a whole. In 1996, Krubitzer won the Herrick Award from the American Association of Anatomists and went on to be part of the MacArthur Fellows Program in 1998. Krubitzer was honored to be part of the MacArthur Fellows Program due to her increased creative drive to further her scientific research. In 1999, Krubitzer was awarded the Special Lecture for the Society for Neuroscience Meeting and in 2002–2003, the James McKeen Cattell Sabbatical Fellowship and Bloedel Visiting Scientist Fellowship. After completing her graduate studies at Vanderbilt University, Krubitzer was awarded the Vanderbilt University Distinguished Alumni Award as a result of her advancements in studying the dynamic neocortex in mammals. In 2012, Krubitzer was awarded with the Dean's Innovation Award, Division of Social Sciences from the University of California Davis.

== Works ==
- "Arealization of the Neocortex in Mammals: Genetic and Epigenetic Contributions to the Phenotype", Brain, Behavior and Evolution, Leah Krubitzer, Kelly J. Huffman
- "Reversible Deactivation of Motor Cortex Reveals Functional Connectivity with Posterior Parietal Cortex in the Prosimian Galago (Otolemur garnettii) Dylan F. Cooke1, Iwona Stepniewska2, Daniel J. Miller2, Jon H. Kaas2, and Leah Krubitzer1
