= Ehsan Hoque (academic) =

American computer scientist and academic

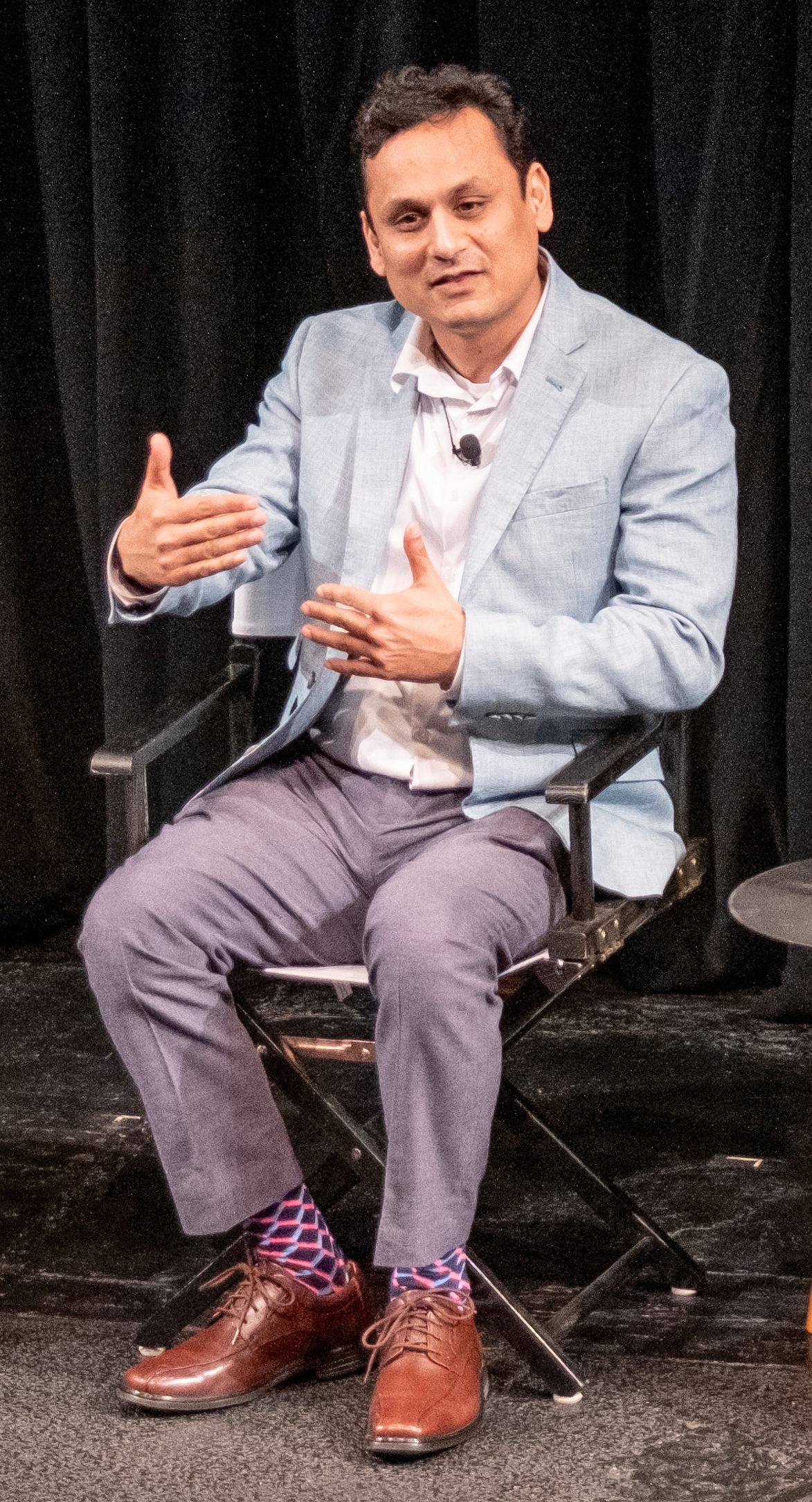
- Ehsan Hoque at New World Stages in New York, speaking at the "Being Human in a Digital Age" session
- Education: Penn State University (BS); University of Memphis (MS); Massachusetts Institute of Technology (PhD)
- Awards: Presidential Early Career Award for Scientists and Engineers (2025); ACM Distinguished Member (2022); Emerging Leaders in Health & Medicine by National Academy of Medicine (2020); Scientist to Watch by Science News (2017); Alumni Achievement Award by Penn State University (2017); Innovators Under 35 (2016)
- Scientific career
- Fields: Social skills training Computational Healthcare; Artificial Intelligence; Human-centric computing
- Workplaces: University of Rochester
- Thesis: Computers to Help with Conversations: Affective Framework to Enhance Human Nonverbal Skills (2013)
- Doctoral advisor: Rosalind Picard
- Website: http://hoques.com/

Ehsan Hoque is an American computer scientist and academic. He is a Professor in the Computer Science Department at the University of Rochester in New York.

Hoque is most known for his work in the field of human-centered artificial intelligence, particularly in utilizing AI methods to augment and enhance human capabilities. His work revolves around affective computing, speech processing, and computer vision.

== Education ==
Hoque completed his Bachelor of Science in Computer Engineering from Penn State University in 2004, and then obtained a master's degree in Electrical and Computer Engineering from the University of Memphis in 2007. Later, he completed his Ph.D. in Media Arts and Sciences from the Massachusetts Institute of Technology in 2013, where the MIT Museum highlighted his Ph.D. thesis as one of the most unconventional inventions of MIT. In 2017, he received the Alumni Achievement Award from Penn State University, and in 2026, he was named an Alumni Fellow in recognition of his exceptional leadership and professional accomplishments.

== Career ==
Hoque began his academic career in 2013 by joining the University of Rochester as an assistant professor in the Computer Science Department, becoming a professor in 2024.

Hoque served as the Interim Director of the Goergen Institute for Data Science at the University of Rochester between 2018 and 2019, and held the Assaro-Biggar family fellowship from 2016 to 2019. From 2023-2025, he served as a board member of the National Academies Health Sciences Policy, providing independent, expert advice on health and medicine to inform public policy, improve healthcare, and guide research, focusing on areas like biomedical ethics, regulatory science, health workforce, and public health challenges through consensus reports and workshops.

From 2023-2024, he served as the Chief Scientist of the National Center for AI, Saudi Authority for Data and Artificial Intelligence--the ministry for AI within the Kingdom of Saudi Arabia. Since 2024, Hoque has led national-scale applied AI initiatives within a large public healthcare system, focusing on translating human-centered AI research into real-world healthcare, mental health, and operational deployments at population scale.

== Research ==
Hoque holds a patent for the concept of utilizing a computer as a conversational mentor, which was introduced in 2012 and later integrated by Microsoft as "Speaker Coach" in PowerPoint, used by millions of users worldwide. In 2019, along with colleagues, he helped establish the Morris K. Udall Center of Excellence in Parkinson's Disease Research by the National Institute of Neurological Disorders and Strokes (NINDS) at the University of Rochester. He has authored numerous publications spanning the areas of Artificial Intelligence, human-centered computing, and medicine, including articles in peer-reviewed journals.

Hoque’s research focuses on building AI systems that provide real-time, interpretable feedback to improve human communication, learning, and health outcomes.

=== Social skills training ===
Hoque is regarded as a pioneer in developing computational techniques to enable social skills training. In 2012, he developed an Automated Conversation Helper that utilized a 3D virtual character to act as an interviewer during a job interview. It offered immediate feedback on the participant's nonverbal behavior by employing advanced technology to detect facial expressions, analyze speech patterns and respond in real-time with synthesized speech and behavior. In related research, his work concluded that automated technologies, specifically those that analyze nonverbal communication and provide feedback, such as My Automated Conversation coacH (MACH), offer a personalized approach to enhancing human social interaction and have the potential to be utilized for both practical and therapeutic purposes. He and his students have expanded the research to develop Live Interactive Social Skills Assistant (LISSA) and Standardized Online Patient for Healthcare Interaction Education (SOPHIE). LISSA provides real-time feedback on smiling, eye contact, body movement and volume in real-time and has been validated to help individuals with Autism Spectrum Disorder. SOPHIE has been designed to train doctors to have more empathy and be explicit with information while dealing with final-stage cancer patients. SOPHIE and LISSA are being adopted or piloted in medical education or clinical training.

=== Tele-neurology ===
Hoque has worked on developing techniques, technologies, and theories, to improve the capacity to accurately recognize, interpret, and respond to human nonverbal cues. He demonstrated that those techniques have implications in health AI. He and his students have developed Parkinson's Analysis with Remote-Kinetic tasks (PARK)—a webcam-based system enabling neurological care to be available anytime, anywhere. The system allows remote participants to perform a set of UPDRS test using a webcam and a microphone and receive a screening for Parkinson's disease, and have the severity of their tremors being automatically measured. PARK has been evaluated across multiple sites or national cohorts.

== Awards and honors ==
- 2014, 2016, 2020 – Google Faculty Research Award
- 2016 – MIT Top 35 Innovators under 35 (TR 35)
- 2017 – Pennsylvania State University Alumni Achievement Award
- 2017 – 10 Scientists to Watch (the SN 10) by Science News
- 2018 – NSF CAREER Award, National Science Foundation
- 2019 – Early Career Award for Scientists and Engineers, Army Research Office
- 2020 – Emerging Leaders in Health and Medicine by the National Academy of Medicine
- 2022 – ACM Distinguished Member
- 2023 – ACM UbiComp 10-Year Impact Award
- 2024 – Presidential Early Career Award for Scientists and Engineers (PECASE)
- 2025 – Letten Prize Runner Up
- 2026 – American Institute for Medical and Biological Engineering (AIMBE)

== Personal ==
Hoque is a triathlete and finished an Ironman Triathlon in 2022 at Maryland and at Lake Placid in 2023.

== Selected articles ==
- Hoque, M. E., McDuff, D. J., & Picard, R. W. (2012). Exploring temporal patterns in classifying frustrated and delighted smiles. IEEE Transactions on Affective Computing, 3(3), 323–334.
- Hoque, M., Courgeon, M., Martin, J. C., Mutlu, B., & Picard, R. W. (2013, September). Mach: My automated conversation coach. In Proceedings of the 2013 ACM international joint conference on Pervasive and ubiquitous computing (pp. 697–706).
- Baten, R. A., Aslin, R. N., Ghoshal, G., & Hoque, E. (2022). Novel idea generation in social networks is optimized by exposure to a “Goldilocks” level of idea-variability. Proceedings of the National Academy of Science (PNAS) Nexus, 1(5), pgac255.
- Islam, M.S., Adnan, T., Abdelkader, A., Liu, Z., Ma, E., Park, S., Azad, A., Liu, P., Pawlik, M., Hartman, E., Shelton, E., Larson, K.B., Rahman, M.S., Schwartz, C., Jaffe, K., Adams, J.L., Schneider, R.B., Freyberg, J., Dorsey, E.R. & Hoque, E. (2025). Remote AI Screening for Parkinson’s Disease: A Multimodal, Cross-Setting Validation Study. New England Journal of Medicine (NEJM) AI. DOI: 10.21203/rs.3.rs-6844936/v1. PMID: 40678252.
