= Kathleen Frank =

Landscape artist based in New Mexico

- Born: 1944 (age 81–82)
- Education: San Jose State University (BA); Pennsylvania State University (MA)
- Known for: Landscape painting
- Website: kathleenfrankart.com

Kathleen Frank (born 1944) is a contemporary landscape artist living in Santa Fe, New Mexico.

Kathleen Frank, Wild West Summer

== Early life and education ==
Kathleen Frank was raised in San Rafael, California. She earned a BA in Fine Art and Design from San Jose State University, California in 1967 and a California Teacher's Certification in Art Education in 1968. Frank taught art and studied woodcarving in Fort Collins, Colorado. Her interest in woodcarving began at Four Winds Camp in the San Juan Islands, Washington, where her mother had been taught by Public Works of Art Project (PWAP) artist Ernest Norling. The camp had many of his works on display. In Pennsylvania, her woodcarving led to a printmaking program at Pennsylvania State University and a Master of Arts degree in 1993. She co-founded the Printmakers Studio Workshop of Central Pennsylvania, which conducted classes and held community art exhibitions. During that time, Frank taught printmaking and costume design at The Grier School, and guest lectured throughout the state and exhibiting the masks and costumes she designed.

== Recognition ==
Frank's work was selected for Art in Embassies/U.S. Department of State for the Ambassador's residence, Kuala Lumpur, Malaysia. She won the Curator's Choice Award at the Art in the West exhibit, High Desert Museum in Bend, Oregon and the 2020 CollexArt Grand Prize Finalist and Purchase Award.

== Selected exhibitions ==
She has had numerous exhibitions, including the Museum of Western Art, Kerrville, Texas; 36th Annual International Exhibition, Meadows Gallery, University of Texas/Tyler; Roux & Cyr International Fine Art Gallery, Portland, Maine; Jane Hamilton Fine Art, Tucson, Arizona; Desert Caballeros Western Museum, Wickenburg, Arizona; American Women Artists, 2020 Spring Online Juried Show; and La Posada de Santa Fe, Santa Fe, New Mexico

== Media coverage ==
Frank has been interviewed on Coffee + Culture, KTRC Radio Santa Fe, New Mexico and Art World Innovators - Interview with Kathleen Frank, University of Manitoba, Canada. Recent features in publications include Southwest Art; Modern Renaissance (cover art); ARTUPMI; Pigeon Review; Bombfire; Blue Mesa Review, Issue 44; MVIBE Magazine, New York; ArLijo, Summer 2021; Aji Magazine; LandEscape Art Review, London, Winter 2020; and Magazine 43, Berlin, Hong Kong, Manila.
