= Shawn Domagal-Goldman =

Shawn D. Domagal-Goldman
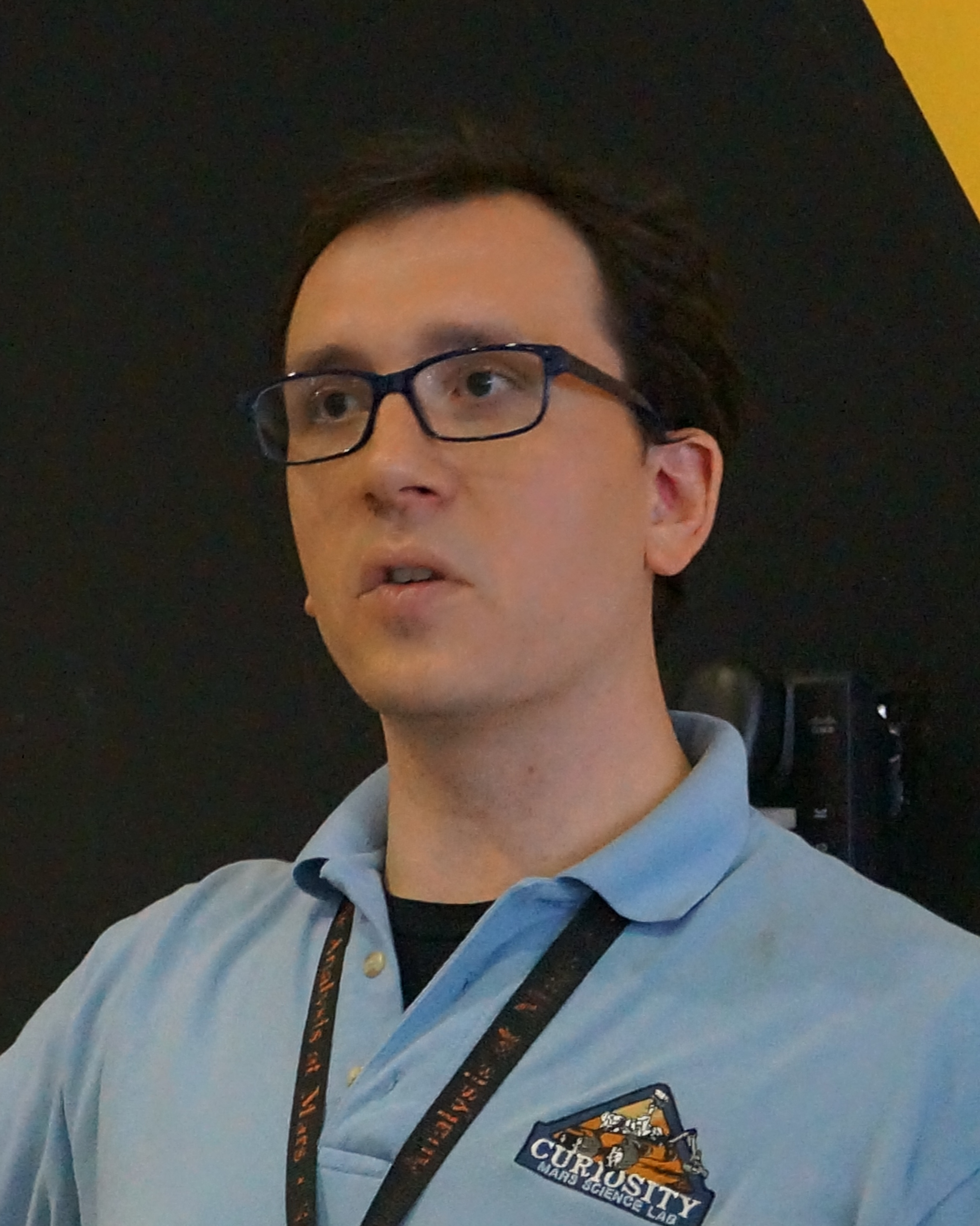
- Dr Shawn Domagal-Goldman at NASA's Goddard facility giving a presentation of space exploration on June 3, 2016.
- Citizenship: United States of America
- Education: Pennsylvania State University
- Known for: exoplanets, Archean geochemistry, planetary atmospheres, and astrobiology
- Children: 1 daughter
- Scientific career
- Workplaces: NASA, Goddard Space Flight Center

Shawn D. Domagal-Goldman is a research space scientist at NASA Goddard Space Flight Center, who specializes in exoplanets, Archean geochemistry, planetary atmospheres, and astrobiology.

== Education and career ==
Domagal-Goldman has a master's degree in Earth Sciences from the University of Rochester and a PhD in Geosciences and Astrobiology, where he was a grad student under James F. Kasting from the Pennsylvania State University.

Domagal-Goldman helped organize FameLab events in the US. He also talks about NASA science in public forums, such as AwesomeCon.

He is a recipient of the 2019 Presidential Early Career Award for Scientists and Engineers.

=== Research ===
For his research into "the early Earth and other terrestrial planets, he works on utilizing isotopic trends as proxies for atmospheric processes and elemental cycling", which "includes work on the fundamental controls on iron isotope fractionation and on global controls on mass-independent Sulfur isotope fractionation (S-MIF)". For extrasolar planets, he works on "spectroscopy-based characterization techniques" that inform scientists about "a planet's surface climate, habitability, and ecosystems".

His research experience includes:

1. July 2007–present, Atmospheric Modeler, NASA Astrobiology Institute · Virtual Planetary Laboratory
2. July 2010–July 2012, NASA Astrobiology Management Postdoctoral Fellow, Oak Ridge Associated Universities, NASA Headquarters
3. July 2008–July 2010, Research Associate, University of Washington Seattle · Department of Astronomy
4. Research Associate at Penn State

== Personal life ==
Domagal-Goldman has a daughter, her name is Maya.

== Bibliography ==
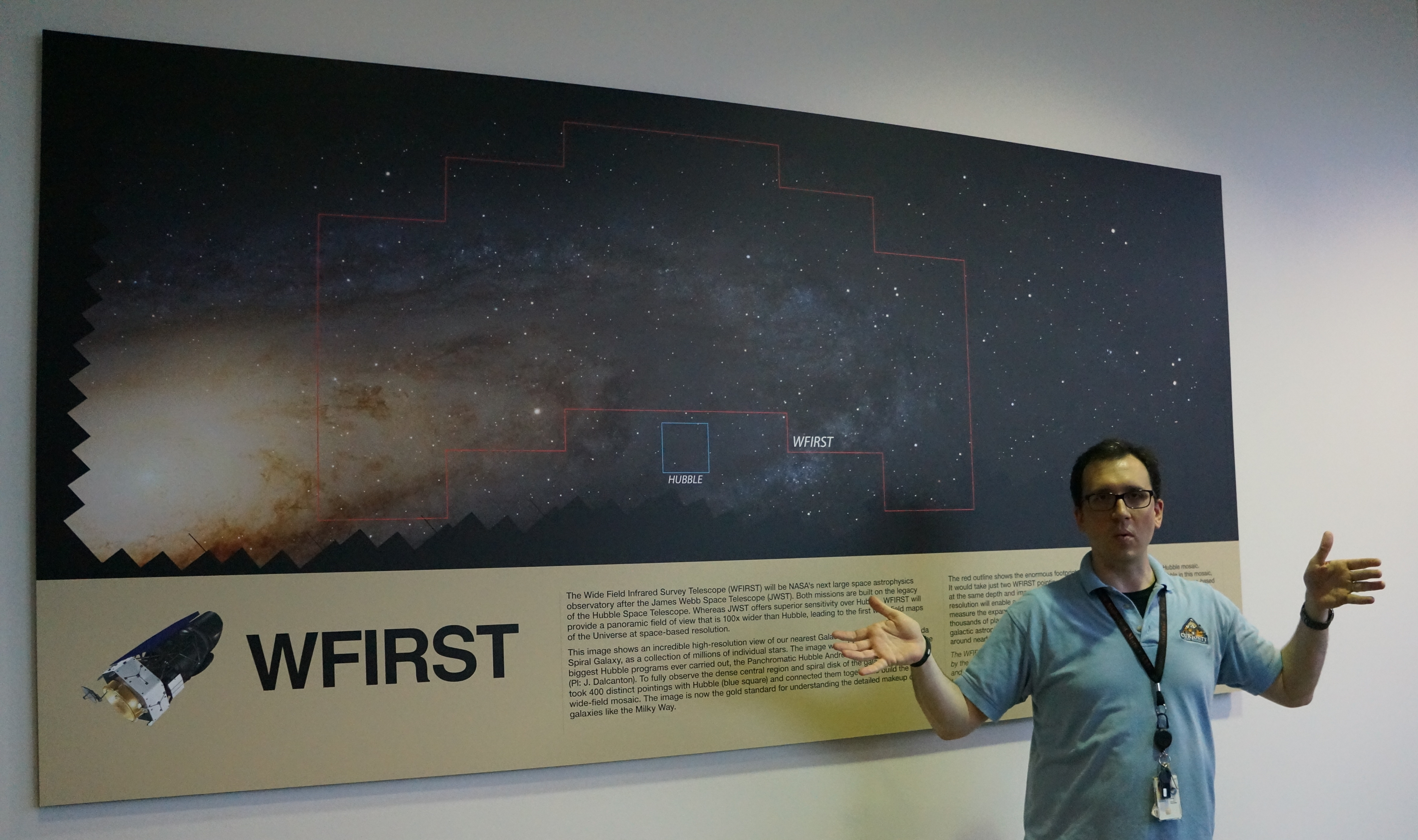
Dr Shawn Domagal-Goldman giving a presentation concerning WFIRST (now named the Nancy Grace Roman Space Telescope).

- Would Contact With Extraterrestrials Benefit or Harm Humanity? A Scenario Analysis
- ABIOTIC OZONE AND OXYGEN IN ATMOSPHERES SIMILAR TO PREBIOTIC EARTH
- Kopparapu R. K., Ramirez R., Kasting J. F.; et al. (2013). "Erratum: Habitable Zones Around Main-sequence Stars: New Estimates (2013, ApJ, 765, 131)". The Astrophysical Journal. 770 (1): 82. arXiv:1301.6674. Bibcode:2013ApJ...770...82K. doi:10.1088/0004-637X/770/1/82. S2CID 120930327.
- Zerkle A. L., Claire M. W., Domagal-Goldman S. D., Farquhar J., Poulton S. W. (2012). "A Bistable Organic-rich Atmosphere on the Neoarchaean Earth". Nature Geoscience. 5 (5): 359–363. Bibcode:2012NatGe...5..359Z. doi:10.1038/ngeo1425.
- Kopparapu, R. K., R. Ramirez, J. F. Kasting, et al. 2012. "Habitable Zones Around Main-sequence Stars: New Estimates." The Astrophysical Journal 765 131.
- Domagal-Goldman S. D., Meadows V. S., Claire M. W., Kasting J. F. (2011). "Using Biogenic Sulfur Gases as Remotely Detectable Biosignatures on Anoxic Planets". Astrobiology. 11 (5): 419–41. Bibcode:2011AsBio..11..419D. doi:10.1089/ast.2010.0509. PMC 3133782. PMID 21663401.
- Domagal-Goldman, S. D., and V. S. Meadows. 2010. "Abiotic Buildup of Ozone." Pathways Towards Habitable Planets 1–6
- Domagal-Goldman S. D., Paul K. W., Sparks D. L., Kubicki J. D. (2009). "Quantum Chemical Study of the Fe(III)-desferrioxamine B Siderophore complex—Electronic Structure, Vibrational Frequencies, and Equilibrium Fe-isotope Fractionation". Geochimica et Cosmochimica Acta. 73 (1): 1–12. Bibcode:2009GeCoA..73....1D. doi:10.1016/j.gca.2008.09.031.
- Domagal-Goldman S. D., Kasting J. F., Johnston D. T., Farquhar J. (2008). "Organic Haze, Glaciations and Multiple Sulfur Isotopes in the Mid-Archean Era". Earth and Planetary Science Letters. 269 (1–2): 29–40. Bibcode:2008E&PSL.269...29D. doi:10.1016/j.epsl.2008.01.040.
- Domagal-Goldman S. D., Kubicki J. D. (2008). "Density Functional Theory Predictions of Equilibrium Isotope Fractionation of Iron Due to Redox Changes and Organic Complexation". Geochimica et Cosmochimica Acta. 72 (21): 5201–5216. Bibcode:2008GeCoA..72.5201D. doi:10.1016/j.gca.2008.05.066.
- Haqq-Misra J. D., Domagal-Goldman S. D., Kasting P. J., Kasting J. F. (2008). "A Revised, Hazy Methane Greenhouse for the Archean Earth". Astrobiology. 8 (6): 1127–37. Bibcode:2008AsBio...8.1127H. doi:10.1089/ast.2007.0197. PMID 19093801.
- Riccardi A., Domagal-Goldman S., Battistuzzi F. U., Cameron V. (2006). "Astrobiology Influx to Astrobiology in Flux". Astrobiology. 6 (3): 397–399. Bibcode:2006AsBio...6..397R. doi:10.1089/ast.2006.6.397. PMID 16805695.
- Domagal-Goldman, S. D., Hollingsworth, J., Glaze, L. (18 March 2016). "Comparing Planetary Climates to Investigate Climate Systems". Comparative Climates of Terrestrial Planets. 2.
