= Vaughn Climenhaga =

American mathematician

- Climenhaga in 2016
- Education: University of Waterloo; Pennsylvania State University
- Occupation: Mathematician

Vaughn Climenhaga is an American mathematician. He is the Klein Distinguished Professor in the department of mathematics and statistics at the University of North Carolina at Charlotte. He previously served as a professor at the University of Houston.

Climenhaga attended the University of Waterloo, earning his B.Math in 2005. He also attended Pennsylvania State University, earning his PhD degree in mathematics in 2010.
