= Albert L. Myerson =

American chemist

Albert L. Myerson (1919 - 2004 in Sarasota, Florida) was a scientist with a specialty in physical chemistry.

== Biography ==
Myerson was born in New York City and mainly raised in Atlantic City, New Jersey.

Myerson contributed greatly to the Manhattan Project during World War II, InterContinental Ballistic Missile research at General Electric and Cornell Aeronautical Laboratory during the Cold War, air pollution research at Exxon in the 1970s and red tide research at Mote Marine Laboratory in the 1980s.

Myerson was also an accomplished classical violinist throughout his life, and performed in community orchestras in New York, New Jersey and Florida.

His paper written during the Manhattan Project while just out of Penn State (regarding the separation of Uranium hexafluoride into U235 and U238 entitled “The Viscosity of Gaseous Uranium Hexafluoride”), was a major factor in the ability to obtain the fissile form of U235 used in the Atomic Bomb. His research and patents in the field of air pollution control have been used by auto companies such as Mitsubishi

Myerson was included in Marquis Who's Who in America, American Men and Women of Science and Who's Who in World Jewry. He also published 47 articles in his field in professional journals (in areas of Combustion, Kinetics of Atomic Chemistry and Collisions of Atomic Species on Surfaces) and was a Patentee in his field. In the academic world, he was awarded the Evan Pugh Medal (1941; Penn State University) in addition to being a Carnegie Scholar (1938-40) and Avoda Scholar (1940).

Myerson received his bachelor's degree in chemistry from Pennsylvania State University in 1941 and a Ph.D. in Chemistry and Physics from the University of Wisconsin.

== Personal life ==
Myerson was married to Arline (Rosenfield) Myerson and had 3 children.
