= Eldon Price =

American college basketball coach (born 1939)

Eldon Price (born September 14, 1939) is an American college basketball coach.

== Career ==
A 1961 Pennsylvania State University graduate, Price began his college coaching career as the men's head coach at Penn State's Beaver campus, where he spent 19 years (1963–87) as the athletics director, physical education chair and head coach of eight sports.

Price was a men's assistant coach with the Rider University Broncs from 1986 to 1989. He was also Rider's golf head coach during that period. Price was the former women's head coach at Rider University and was the first women's basketball head coach in Rider history to compile over 100 wins (he has 162). Under Price, the Broncs improved their record every year over five seasons.

During his 35 years as a head coach, Price earned nearly 400 career victories.

From 2007 until his retirement in 2009, Price was the Director of Basketball Operations at Penn State University.
