= Koraly Pérez-Edgar =

Developmental psychologist

- Occupations: McCourtney Professor of Child Studies and Professor of Psychology

Academic background
- Education: Dartmouth College; Harvard University

Koraly Elisa Pérez-Edgar is a developmental psychologist who studies the temperament of young children and connections between temperament, anxiety disorders, and other forms of psychopathology. She is known for her studies of shy children who may develop behavioral inhibition or social anxiety.

Pérez-Edgar is a McCourtney Professor of Child Studies and Professor of Psychology at Pennsylvania State University where she directs the Cognition, Affect, and Temperament Lab. Pérez-Edgar is the Editor-in-Chief of the journal Developmental Psychology.

== Biography ==
Pérez-Edgar earned her AB in Psychology at Dartmouth College in 1995, where she conducted research under the supervision Alfonso Caramazza. Pérez-Edgar continued her studies at Harvard University, where she received her master's degree (1998) and Ph.D. (2001) in Psychology. Her dissertation titled "Attentional Control in Emotional Contexts: The Potential Role of Temperament" was supervised by Jerome Kagan. She conducted post-doctoral research with Nathan A. Fox at the University of Maryland, where they used electrophysiology to study children's responses to emotion words and emotionally charged conditions.

Before moving to Penn State in 2011, Pérez-Edgar was part of the faculty at George Mason University (2006-2011). In 2021, Pérez-Edgar received Penn State's 2021 Graduate Faculty Teaching Award in recognition of outstanding teaching performance and advising of graduate students. Her research has been funded by the National Institutes of Health.

== Research ==
Pérez-Edgar studies the temperament and emotional development of young children. She has taken a variety of approaches to find explanations for social anxiety and other behavioral difficulties that children encounter, and how such difficulties may be related to differences in parenting styles and other external factors. Pérez-Edgar and her colleagues have documented atypical attentional biases in young children with behavioral inhibition who tend to withdraw from social situations. These children are at heightened risk of developing chronic anxiety and other forms of psychopathology.

In a randomized controlled trial involving children with symptoms of anxiety, Pérez-Edgar and her colleagues found evidence that a treatment to modify attentional biases was effective in reducing the number and severity of anxiety symptoms as compared to a placebo condition.

== Books ==
- Pérez-Edgar, K., & Fox, N. A. (Eds.). (2018). Behavioral inhibition: Integrating theory, research, and clinical perspectives. Springer International Publishing.
- LoBue, V., Pérez-Edgar, K., & Buss, K. A. (Eds.). (2019). Handbook of emotional development. Springer.

== Representative publications ==
- Chronis-Tuscano, Andrea; Degnan, Kathryn Amey; Pine, Daniel S.; Perez-Edgar, Koraly; Henderson, Heather A.; Diaz, Yamalis; Raggi, Veronica L.; Fox, Nathan A. (September 2009). "Stable Early Maternal Report of Behavioral Inhibition Predicts Lifetime Social Anxiety Disorder in Adolescence". Journal of the American Academy of Child & Adolescent Psychiatry. 48 (9): 928–935. doi:10.1097/chi.0b013e3181ae09df. PMC 2789287. PMID 19625982.
- Eldar, Sharon; Apter, Alan; Lotan, Daniel; Edgar, Koraly Perez; Naim, Reut; Fox, Nathan A.; Pine, Daniel S.; Bar-Haim, Yair (February 2012). "Attention Bias Modification Treatment for Pediatric Anxiety Disorders: A Randomized Controlled Trial". American Journal of Psychiatry. 169 (2): 213–230. doi:10.1176/appi.ajp.2011.11060886. PMC 3491316. PMID 22423353.
- McDermott, Jennifer M.; Perez-Edgar, Koraly; Henderson, Heather A.; Chronis-Tuscano, Andrea; Pine, Daniel S.; Fox, Nathan A. (March 2009). "A History of Childhood Behavioral Inhibition and Enhanced Response Monitoring in Adolescence Are Linked to Clinical Anxiety". Biological Psychiatry. 65 (5): 445–448. doi:10.1016/j.biopsych.2008.10.043. PMC 2788124. PMID 19108817.
- Pérez-Edgar, Koraly; Fox, Nathan A. (October 2005). "Temperament and Anxiety Disorders". Child and Adolescent Psychiatric Clinics of North America. 14 (4): 681–706. doi:10.1016/j.chc.2005.05.008. PMID 16171698.
- Pérez-Edgar, Koraly; Bar-Haim, Yair; McDermott, Jennifer Martin; Chronis-Tuscano, Andrea; Pine, Daniel S.; Fox, Nathan A. (2010). "Attention biases to threat and behavioral inhibition in early childhood shape adolescent social withdrawal". Emotion. 10 (3): 349–357. doi:10.1037/a0018486. PMC 3614079. PMID 20515224.
