= Bin Chen =

Material scientist

Bin Chen is a Chinese-born American materials scientist who works at the NASA Ames Research Center and is an adjunct professor at the University of California, Santa Cruz. She earned a B.S. from Nanjing University and a Ph.D. from Pennsylvania State University.

== Biography ==
Bin Chen was born in China. After graduating from Nanjing University with a B.S. in Chemistry, she moved to the United States for graduate school. After briefly studying at Boston University and the University of Illinois at Urbana-Champaign, she moved to Pennsylvania State University and earned a Ph.D. in Chemistry. She then moved to Palo Alto, where she was hired by the University of California, Santa Cruz, and NASA Ames Research Center.

== Research ==
Chen has worked on materials synthesis and applications for both sustainable energy and ultra-sensitive detection techniques. She has conducted over $3 million worth of federal projects (NASA, DARPA, and DTRA) on materials studies and device fabrication in the past five years. Her current interest is energy harvesting and storage devices based on hybrid nanocomposite materials. The Chen group conducts multidisciplinary research projects involving electrical engineers, physicists, material scientists, chemists, and planetary scientists ranging from undergraduates to postdoctoral researchers. Bin Chen has been profiled in both the Dekker Encyclopedia of Nanoscience and Nanotechnology and Marquis Who’s Who in America. Her work has been highlighted at Technology Review by MIT (2007) and IEEE Nanotechnology Initiative recognition. Chen is a NASA TGER award recipient. Bin Chen's journal articles include Molecular Fiber Sensors Based on Surface Enhanced Raman Scattering (SERS) and Renewable Energy: Solar Fuels GRC and GRS.
