= Smeal College of Business =

Business school of the Pennsylvania State University

Penn State Smeal College of Business
- Penn State Smeal College of Business logo
- Type: Public
- Established: 1953
- Dean: Corey Phelps
- Location: University Park, Pennsylvania, U.S. 40.80345°N 77.86612°W
- Campus: Suburban
- Website: smeal.psu.edu

Business school rankings

U.S. MBA Rankings
- Bloomberg (2025): NR
- U.S. News & World Report (2026): 33

Global MBA Rankings
- QS (2026): 73
- FT (2026): 86 (tie)

The Penn State Smeal College of Business at the Pennsylvania State University offers undergraduate, graduate, and executive education programs to more than 6,000 students. Accredited by the Association to Advance Collegiate Schools of Business (AACSB), Smeal, is home to more than 150 faculty members who teach and conduct academic research on a range of business topics. The college also features a network of industry-supported research centers.

== History ==
The business college at Penn State was founded in 1953 with Ossian R. MacKenzie as dean. Subsequent deans of the college were Eugene J. Kelley, J.D. Hammond, Judy Olian, James B. Thomas, Charles H. Whiteman, and currently Corey Phelps. In 1990, it was named the Mary Jean and Frank P. Smeal College of Business after alumni and benefactors Mary Jean and Frank Smeal.

== Campus ==
The Smeal College of Business is based on Penn State's University Park campus, which is adjacent to the town of State College, Pennsylvania. Smeal is headquartered in the Business Building, a 210,000 square-foot facility located near the eastern end of campus.

The building, which was dedicated in 2005, was designed by Robert A.M. Stern Architects/BLT Architects and features classroom and office space as well as video-conferencing technologies, team study and recruiter interview rooms, a restaurant, and the college's Rogers Family Trading Room.

== Educational programs ==
The Smeal College of Business offers the following degree programs:

Undergraduate: Smeal offers undergraduate students multiple majors and minors, including finance, accounting and marketing.

Master of Business Administration: The University Park-based residential graduate program provides students with the opportunity to concentrate in an area of business, including finance, marketing, and entrepreneurship. The Smeal MBA Program also offers joint-degree programs with other academic units at Penn State, including the Penn State Dickinson School of Law, the Penn State Eberly College of Science, and the Penn State College of Medicine.

Executive Master of Business Administration: Most class sessions for the 21-month graduate program are delivered on alternate weekends at the ACE Conference Center in Lafayette Hill, Pennsylvania. The program format is designed for working students with at least eight years of post-undergraduate professional experience.

Master of Accounting: Coursework for the Integrated Master of Accounting Program begins in the fall semester of the undergraduate junior year. Graduation occurs after the fifth year with students earning both a bachelor's and master's degree in accounting simultaneously. Smeal also offers a One-Year Master of Accounting Program for students who already have an undergraduate degree from Penn State or another institution.

Master of Professional Studies in Supply Chain Management: Delivered primarily online, the two-year graduate degree program is designed for students working in the supply chain field. Courses are taught by faculty members from the Smeal Department of Supply Chain and Information Systems.

Doctoral: Smeal Ph.D. students specialize in one of six primary fields: accounting, finance, management and organization, marketing, real estate, and supply chain and information systems. The doctoral program focuses on developing academic research and publishing capabilities.

Smeal also offers non-degree business education programs:

Penn State Executive Programs: The executive education unit within Smeal offers multiple-day, non-degree executive education programs and business consulting services to organizations.

== Faculty ==
There are more than 150 faculty members who teach and conduct research within six academic departments at Smeal: Accounting, Finance, Management and Organization, Marketing, Risk Management, and Supply Chain and Information Systems.

The University of Texas at Dallas Top 100 Business School Research Rankings have ranked Smeal No. 14 overall in the nation for faculty research productivity. The survey data is based on faculty research contributions in leading business journals.

== Research centers ==
Smeal is home to a network of research centers, including the Center for Supply Chain Research, the Institute for the Study of Business Markets, the Institute for Real Estate Studies, and the Laboratory for Economics, Management and Auctions (LEMA).

== Alumni ==
The Penn State Smeal College of Business has more than 90,000 alumni around the world with regional chapters in Washington, DC; Philadelphia; Pittsburgh; and New York City. Prominent alumni include:

- William Schreyer - Former Chairman and CEO, Merrill Lynch & Co.
- John Surma – Former CEO, U.S. Steel
- Patricia Woertz – President and CEO, Archer Daniels Midland
- Jared Freid – comedian, television host, and podcaster

Alumni and friends of Smeal comprise advisory boards at the college, including the Smeal Board of Visitors and the Alumni Society Board. These boards provide counsel and guidance on a number of strategic decisions at the college.

== See also ==
- List of business schools in the United States
- List of United States graduate business school rankings
