= Verne M. Willaman =

American business executive and philanthropist (1928–2012)

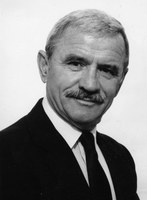
- Willaman in 1999
- Born: August 13, 1928; Greenville, Pennsylvania, US
- Died: June 9, 2012 (aged 83); San Luis Obispo, California, US
- Education: Pennsylvania State University
- Occupations: Business executive, philanthropist

Verne M. Willaman (August 20, 1928 – June 9, 2012) was an American business executive and philanthropist. He was chairman and president of pharmaceutical firm Ortho Pharmaceutical Corporation and director and member of the executive committee of Johnson & Johnson.

== Early life and education ==
Willaman was born in Greenville, Pennsylvania, and grew up in Fredonia, Pennsylvania. He graduated from Pennsylvania State University in 1951 with a degree in biological chemistry, and then served a tour of duty in the U.S. Navy during the Korean War aboard the aircraft carrier USS Franklin D. Roosevelt (CV-42).

== Career ==
Willaman began his career as a pharmaceutical sales representative for Ortho Pharmaceutical and rose through the executive ranks to president in 1969 and chairman in 1976. He became a director and member of the executive committee of Johnson & Johnson in 1977 and retired in 1988. Among his other professional activities was service on the board of directors and the executive committee of the Pharmaceutical Manufacturers Association and the board of directors of the American Federation of Pharmaceutical Education.

He was a trustee of the Somerset County Medical Center, a founding member of the Middlesex County Multiple Sclerosis Society and also served on the National Council of Crime and Delinquency and as a trustee of Marcus J. Lawrence Memorial Hospital in Arizona.

== Philanthropy ==
Willaman is among the largest individual donors to Pennsylvania State University having donated more than $27 million to the university. His gifts to Penn State included endowed positions in the Eberly College of Science including the dean's chair, faculty chairs and professorships in Astronomy and Astrophysics, Mathematics, Biology and Statistics. He also provided support for graduate fellowships and a range of projects and programs.

Penn State honored Willaman as a Distinguished Alumnus in 1993. In 2004, the university named the Willaman Gateway to the Sciences in his honor.

In honor of his parents, he established the Prescott and Mary Willaman Scholarships to assist undergraduates with financial need and a proven academic record. Willaman also provided substantial financial support to numerous other charitable causes supporting the arts, sciences, veterans, churches, libraries and school programs.

In 1999, Slate magazine included Willaman in its annual Slate60 which profiles the 60 largest American charitable contributions for the year.

== Personal life ==
Willaman had two children, a son Mark M. Willaman and a daughter Wendy Willaman.
