= Nuclear art =

Art movement

Nuclear art was an artistic approach developed by some artists and painters, after the bombings of Hiroshima and Nagasaki.

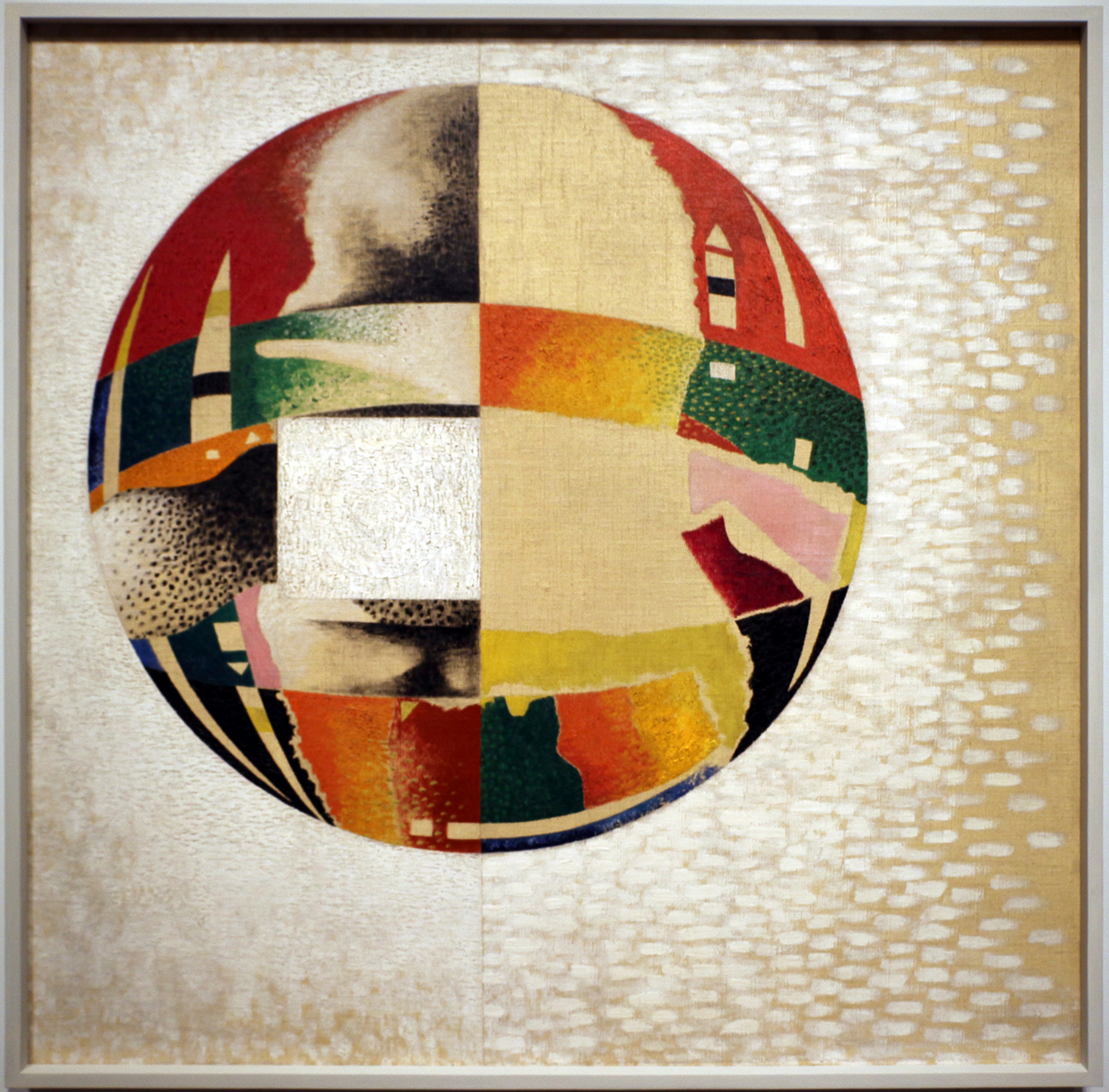
László Moholy-Nagy, Nuclear II, 1946 (Milwaukee art museum)

== Conception and origins ==
In the days, weeks and years following the atomic bombing of Japan, trained and untrained artists who survived the bombings began documenting their experiences in artworks. The U.S. occupation authorities controlled the release of photographs and film footage of these events, while photographers and artists on the ground continued to produce visual representations of the effects of nuclear warfare. Photographer Yōsuke Yamahata began taking photographs of Nagasaki on August 10, 1945 (the day after the bombing), however his photographs were not released to the public until 1952 when the magazine Asahi Gurafu published them.

=== Historical nuclear art in Italy ===
In 1948, the artistic movement of Eaismo published a manifesto illustrating some aspects of the Atomic Age and, at the same time, criticizing the industrial use of nuclear power.

It was a movement of poetry and painting, founded by the Italian artist Voltolino Fontani, aiming to balance the role of men in a society upset by the danger of nuclear radiation. The artistic group was strengthened by the poet Marcello Landi and by the literary critic Guido Favati. In 1948 Voltolino Fontani depicted the disintegration and fragmentation of an atom on canvas, by creating the artwork: Dinamica di assestamento e mancata stasi.

In 1950 the painter Fortunato Depero published the Manifesto per la pittura e plastica nucleare.

In 1951 the painters Enrico Baj and Sergio Dangelo created the Arte nucleare movement, criticizing and putting the repetitiveness of painting (as an artistic and commercial phenomenon) in discussion. Plenty of Italian artists, in Milan and Naples, and foreigners like Yves Klein, Asger Jorn, Arman, Antonio Saura joined the movement. The main representative of the arte nucleare movement was Piero Manzoni, who in this context, for the first time in his life, put his talent in evidence.

Unlike Eaismo, recommending artists to pursue painting values (and poetry), the arte nucleare movement tried to promote a new form of art in which painting was marginalized.

=== Historical nuclear art in Spain ===
In the meantime, Spanish painter Salvador Dalí published the Mystical manifesto (1951), putting Catholic mysticism and nuclear themes together. In this period Dalì created artworks like Idillio atomico (1945) and Leda Atomica (1949).

=== Historical nuclear art in France ===
In 1949 the French artist Bernard Lorjou started to paint his monumental artwork l’age atomique ("The atomic age"). The painting was concluded after one year and is now located in the Centre Pompidou. In 1950 Germaine Joumard exhibited 26 nuclear paintings at galerie "Art et lecture" in Paris

=== Historical nuclear art in Belgium ===
The first exhibition of the Arte nucleare movement took place in Brussels, in the Galerie Apollo (1952). Apart from that, the interest of Belgian artists in nuclear art is above all demonstrated by the contribution of two former participants of art movement CoBrA, such as Wout Hoeboer and Serge Vandercam. Both signed the Manifesto contro lo stile (1957), which was chronologically the second manifesto of Sergio Dangelo and Enrico Baj's italian group.

=== Historical nuclear art in the United States ===
The painter and photographer Eugene Von Bruenchenhein painted the artwork “Atomic age” in 1955, and other apocalyptical and post apocalyptical paintings up to 1965.

The British sculptor Henry Moore created a bronze public sculpture entitled Nuclear Energy (sculpture) (1967), which both depicted the fatality of nuclear weapons and celebrated the invention of nuclear energy for use as electrical power. The sculpture is located on the grounds of the University of Chicago, where the first self-sustaining nuclear reaction was produced at the Chicago Pile-1, under the oversight of the Manhattan Project and Enrico Fermi. The sculpture is in the form of a hybrid mushroom cloud and human skull.

== Contemporary approaches to nuclear art ==
=== Japan ===
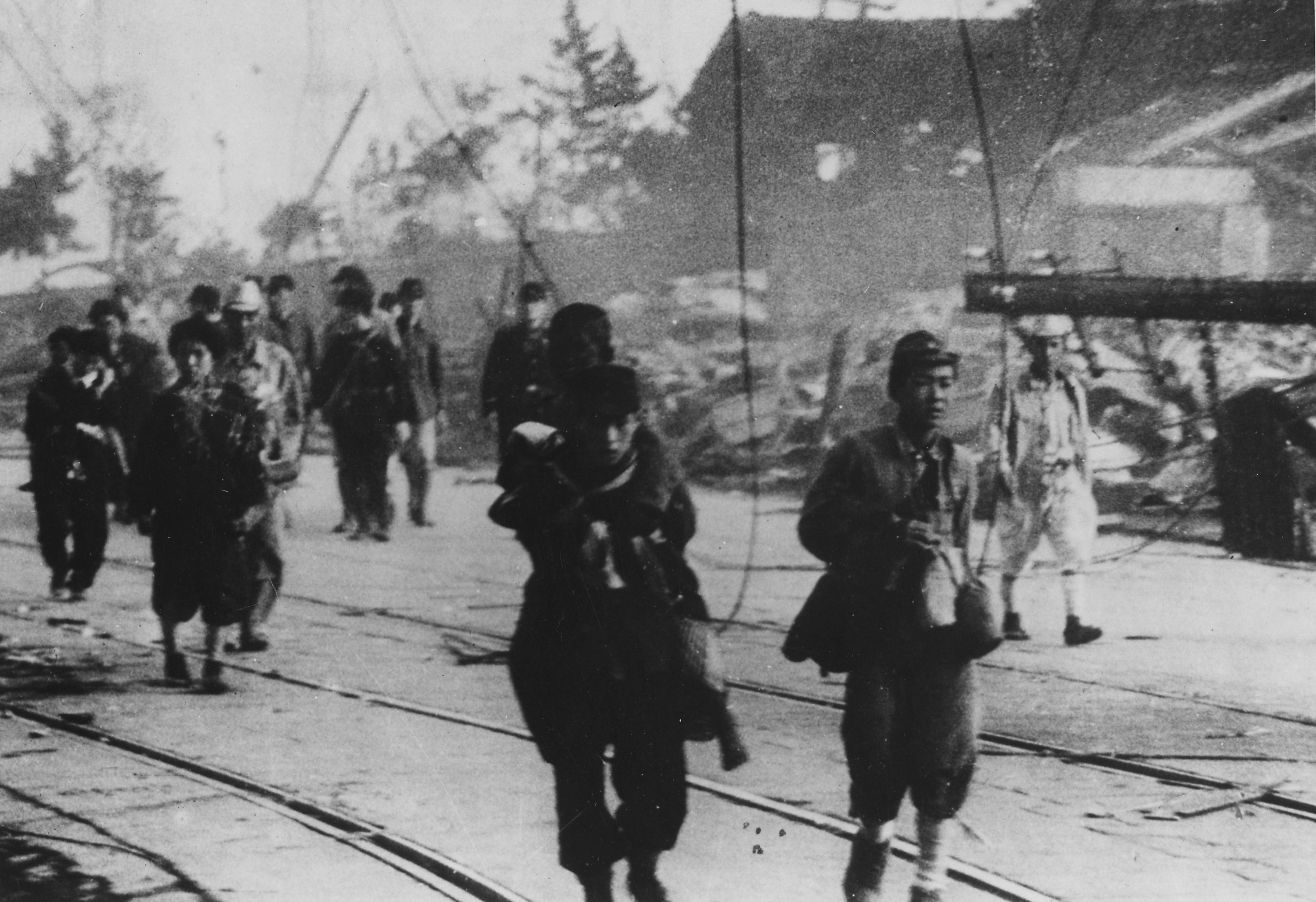
Yōsuke Yamahata, Nagasaki Survivors, 1945

After the March 2011 accident that caused three nuclear reactors to melt down at the Fukushima Daiichi power plant in Japan, there have been numerous responses by contemporary Japanese artists, including Shigenobu Yoshida, Tatsuo Miyajima, Shimpei Takeda, Fuyuki Yamakawa, Iri and Toshi Maruki, and Hiroshima bomb survivor, Tadasi Tonoshiki. In 2015 an exhibition was organized in the Fukushima exclusion zone, "Don't Follow the Wind" by curator, Kenji Kubota, that includes the work of 12 international artists.

=== North America ===
The cultural critic, Akira Mizuta Lippit, has written that the bombings of Hiroshima and Nagasaki were the most significant photographic and cinematic event of the 20th Century. There have been numerous exhibitions of photographic works, including the 2015 show, Camera Atomica, at the Art Gallery of Ontario, exhibiting two hundred works.

In addition to photography, contemporary North American artists have engaged with nuclear themes through painting, installation, and curatorial practice. Among them is Angel Rafael "Ralph" Vázquez-Concepción, a Puerto Rican artist, curator, and educator whose work explores the emotional and historical dimensions of nuclear technology. Vázquez-Concepción’s artistic practice incorporates visual representations of radiation, energy, and atomic structures, utilizing scientific instruments such as seismographs and radiographic imaging to create layered, textured compositions. Through the use of color and gesture, his work examines the tensions between human agency and the indifferent forces of the universe, drawing on both historical and contemporary discourses surrounding nuclear science.

Vázquez-Concepción’s art projects further contribute to the discourse on nuclear energy, engaging with both the aesthetic and political dimensions of atomic history. His advocacy for nuclear energy, particularly in relation to Puerto Rico’s energy infrastructure, informs his artistic vision, which seeks to highlight the dual nature of nuclear power as both a force of destruction and a means of progress. By integrating historical inquiry with contemporary artistic methodologies, Vázquez-Concepción’s work situates him within a lineage of nuclear artists who examine the intersections of science, history, and human resilience.

Contemporary exhibitions have played a crucial role in expanding public discourse on nuclear energy and its cultural impact. Notably, Hot Spots: Radioactivity and the Landscape (2016) at the Krannert Art Museum in Illinois brought together artists and collectives exploring the long-term environmental effects of nuclear energy. Similarly, The Scholar Stones Project (2020) at the Museum of Contemporary Art in Chicago featured works by Yelena Popova, who incorporated soil from nuclear sites worldwide into her paintings. These exhibitions, among others, reflect the ongoing engagement of contemporary artists with issues related to nuclear technology, from the environmental consequences of radiation to the ethical dilemmas posed by nuclear energy and weaponry.

== Bibliography ==
- E.Baj, S.Dangelo, Manifeste de peinture nucleaire, Brussels, 1952, in T. Sauvage, Pittura italiana del dopoguerra, Scwwarz Editore, Milan, 1998.
- Martina Corgnati, Il Movimento nucleare arte a Milano, edizioni Credito Artigiano, Milan, 1998.
- Joseph Vittorio Greco (November 1973). "Storia della poesia del dopoguerra by Luigi Vita". The Modern Language Journal (Review). 57 (7). National Federation of Modern Language Teachers Associations: 367–368. doi:10.2307/324669. JSTOR 324669.
