= Craig H. Martell =

American computer scientist

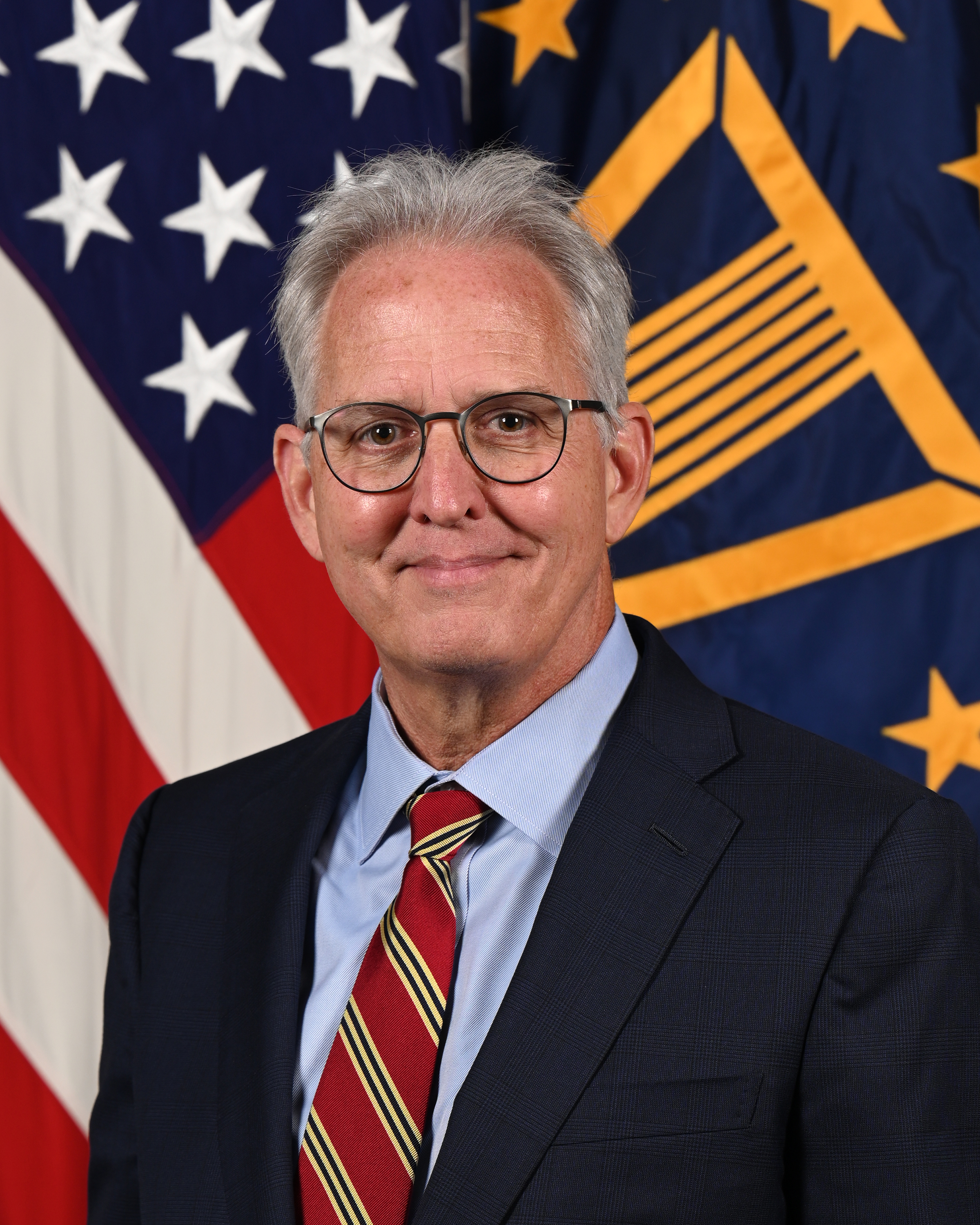
- Official portrait, 2022

Chief Digital and Artificial Intelligence Office
- In office June 6, 2022 – March 31, 2024
- Succeeded by: Radha Iyengar Plumb

Personal details
- Education: University of Pennsylvania (PhD, Computer Science)

Craig H. Martell is an American computer scientist and technology executive. He served as the first Chief Digital and Artificial Intelligence Officer (CDAO) of the U.S. Department of Defense. Martell has a background in artificial intelligence (AI) and machine learning, having led AI teams in both academia and industry. Prior to his role at the Pentagon, he held senior positions at technology companies including LinkedIn, Dropbox, and Lyft, and was a professor of computer science at the Naval Postgraduate School. He is currently the CTO of Lockheed Martin.

== Early life and education ==
Craig Martell grew up in Vermont and Florida. He graduated Gainesville High School (Florida) in 1982.

Martell pursued graduate degrees in philosophy and political science before shifting his focus to computer science. He earned a Ph.D. in Computer and Information Science from the University of Pennsylvania. His interdisciplinary background informed his later research interests, particularly in how AI intersects with human behavior and ethics.

== Academic career ==
In 2003, Martell joined the faculty at the Naval Postgraduate School (NPS) in Monterey, California, where he specialized in natural language processing (NLP). He served as an associate chairman of the computer science department and conducted research on AI and robotics. He co-authored papers on controlling heterogeneous robotic agents and contributed to computer science education through his book Great Principles of Computing (MIT Press, 2015), co-authored with Peter Denning.

== Industry career ==
Martell transitioned to the technology industry in the mid-2010s. At LinkedIn, he led AI initiatives, including the creation of the LinkedIn AI Academy, which trained employees on AI concepts. He later became Head of Machine Intelligence at Dropbox and then Head of Machine Learning at Lyft, where he developed scalable AI platforms for ride-sharing services. In 2024, Martell was appointed Chief Technology Officer (CTO) of Cohesity, an AI-driven data security company. After Cohesity's acquisition of Veritas in December 2024, he became the Chief AI Officer for the combined company. As of June 2025, Martell is the CTO of Lockheed Martin.

== Chief Digital and Artificial Intelligence Officer (CDAO) ==
In April 2022, Martell was named the Pentagon's first Chief Digital and Artificial Intelligence Officer (CDAO). The role was created to unify and accelerate digital transformation and AI adoption across the DoD. Reporting directly to the Deputy Secretary of Defense, Martell led initiatives on secure data sharing, AI strategy, and responsible AI implementation.

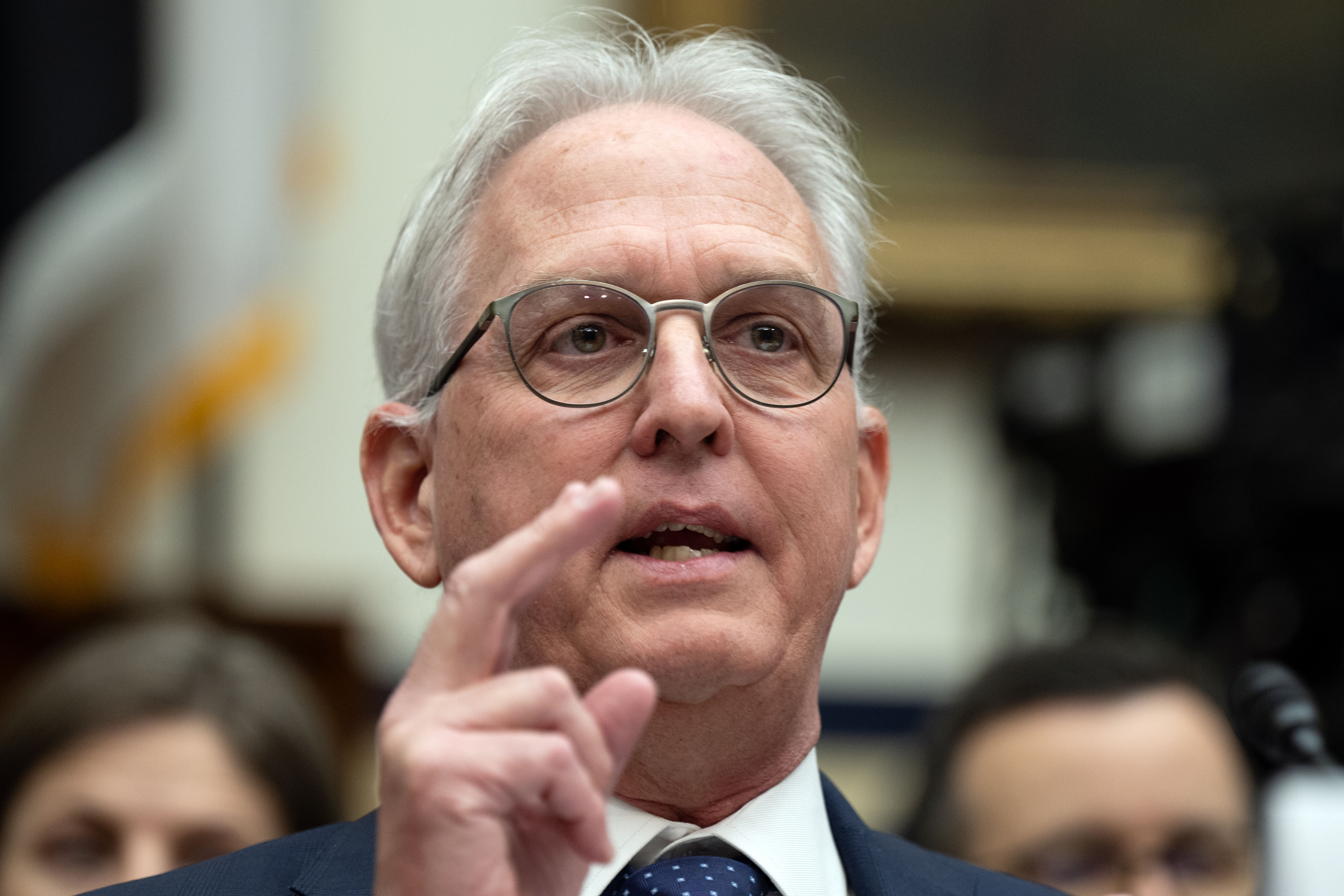

During his tenure, he emphasized the importance of data infrastructure as a prerequisite for AI advancements. His office developed AI strategy guidance and contributed to the Joint All-Domain Command and Control (JADC2) initiative. He also promoted responsible AI use within the military and testified before Congress on AI risks.

Martell led Task Force Lima to better understand how generative artificial intelligence (AI) tools, like large language models, can and should be most effectively used within the Department of Defense.

Martell resigned from the position in April 2024.

== Department of Defense Medal for Distinguished Public Service ==
In March 2024, Craig Martell was awarded the Department of Defense Medal for Distinguished Public Service. The Medal was awarded by then Deputy Secretary of Defense Kathleen Hicks.

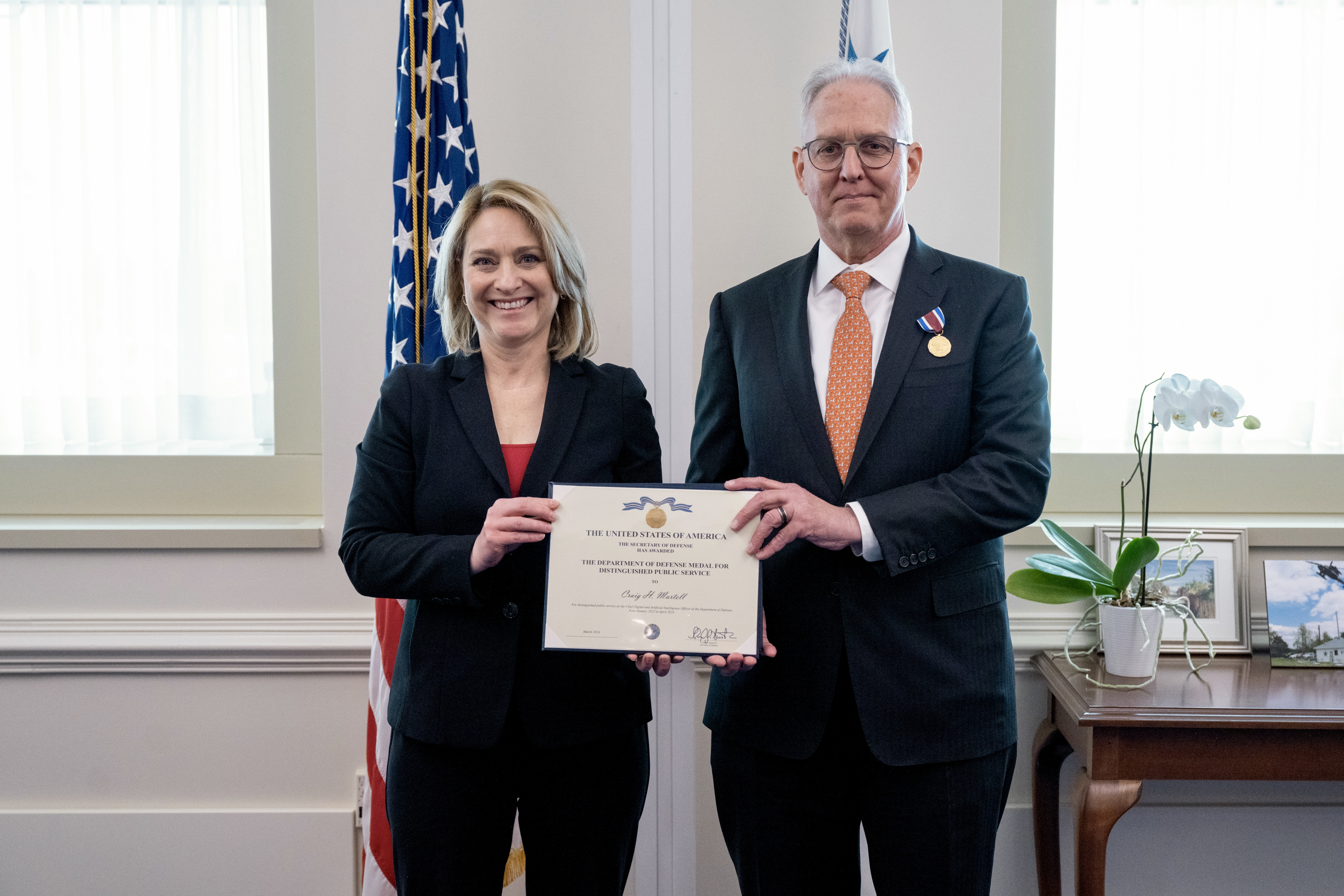

== Notable appearances and press ==
- Martell gave a keynote at NATO in Dec 2022. Dr. Martell's NATO Keynote
- Martell testified before the House Armed Services Committee, in March 2023, on the topic of Defense in a Digital Era: Artificial Intelligence, Information Technology, and Securing the Department of Defense.
- Martell testified at the first-ever classified briefing on the national security implications of artificial intelligence before the full-senate in closed session in July 2023.
- Martell was interviewed on CNN by Christiane Amanpour in August 2023.
- Martell testified before the House Oversight Committee, Subcommittee on Cybersecurity, Information Technology, and Government Innovation, in September 2023, regarding How Federal Agencies are Harnessing Artificial Intelligence.
- Martell testified before the House Armed Services Committee, in March 2024, on The Technology and AI Fight for 21st Century Operations in the Department of Defense.

== Awards ==
He was recognized with the Wash100 Award in 2023 and 2024 for his contributions to government AI policy and responsible AI advocacy.
