= Marcello Landi =

Italian painter

Marcello Landi (1916–1993) was an Italian painter and poet.

== Biography ==
Landi was born into the artistic Landi family in Cecina in 1916. In 1948 he co-signed the Manifesto of Eaismo, an analysis of man's new role in the Atomic Age, alongside the poet Guido Favati and the painters Voltolino Fontani, Angelo Sirio Pellegrini and Aldo Neri. He participated in the group's exhibitions in 1949, at the Casa di Dante in Florence; in 1953 at the House of Culture of Livorno, and finally in 1959 at the gallery Pascucci in Grosseto. Landi and Favati followed the central tenets of the movement with great conviction.

The 1950s were years of intense literary activity, culminating in his winning the poetry prize from the City of Florence (1955), and another poetry prize from the Citadel in 1956. During this period Landi devoted himself actively to debating ideas in contemporary art through columns in major newspapers, especially "Il Giornale del Mattino" (Florence). In 1970 he won the poetry prize "Montebelluna", and in 1983 the "National Literary Prize" of Pisa.

In the 1960s he formed the painter's group 'Gli Ultimi' together with Fontani and Pellegrini Sirio and exhibited continuously at the Bottega d'Arte Livorno. His paintings usually depicted 'atomic landscapes', in which the descriptive and narrative element is reduced to the pure essence of forms, showing a keen sense of abandonment and loneliness.

In 1977 he moved from Livorno to Rome. In the same year, he was honored with the establishment of the "National Poetry Prize Marcello Landi" in Livorno, which was awarded until 2001.

The last few years of his life were complicated by poor health and psychological problems. These would impact his activities until his death in Rome in 1993.

== Collections of poetry ==
- Speranza da inventare, editore Vallecchi, Firenze 1953.
- Storia a pezzi, edizioni La Mangusta, 1955.
- Via dalla Terra, editore Vallecchi, Firenze 1959.
- Uomo e uomo, editore L’Ussero, Pisa 1964.
- La prova dei pianeti, editore Trevi. Roma 1968
- Le pietre di Volterra, Nuove edizioni Vallecchi, Firenze 1974.
- La città nera, editore Fermenti, Roma 1976.
- Dietro i battenti, Nuove edizioni Vallecchi, Firenze 1979.
- Horror vacui, editore Trevi, Roma 1980.
- Malmenati orizzonti, editore L'Officina Libri, Roma 1982.
- La memoria demente, editore Florida, Roma 1982.
- Fantapoesie in ciclostile, Stampart, Roma 1984.

== Bibliography ==
=== On his poetry ===
- U. Fasolo, Nuovi poeti, editore Vallecchi, Firenze 1950.
- P. Bargellini, Pian dei giullari. Panorama storico della letteratura italiana, editore Vallecchi, Firenze 1950.
- F. Flora, Storia della letteratura italiana, volume V, Mondadori, Milano 1954.
- E. Falqui, La giovane poesia italiana, edizioni Colombo, Roma 1955.
- D. Triggiani, Per la storia della letteratura italiana contemporanea, edizioni Triggiani, Bari, 1967.
- G.A. Pellegrinetti, Un secolo di poesia, editore G. B. Petrini, Torino 1967.
- G. Barberi Squarotti, La cultura e la poesia italiana del dopo guerra, editore Cappelli, Bologna 1968.
- A. Frattini, Poesia nuova in Italia, edizioni IPL, Milano.
- L. Pignotti, Istruzioni per l’uso degli ultimi modelli di poesia, editore Lerici, Milano 1969.
- A. Frattini, Dai Crepuscolari ai nuovissimi, editore Marzorati, Milano 1969.
- M. Camillucci, Enciclopedia della letteratura mondiale, edizioni Paoline, Torino 1969.
- V. Vettori, Storia letteraria della civiltà italiana, editore Giardini, Pisa 1969.
- L. Luisi, Lettera a Marcello Landi, Belforte Editore, Livorno 1969.
- Mladen Machiedo, Novi talijanski pjesnici, Split 1971.
- A.I. Cecchini, Poeti toscani del ‘900, Editalia, Roma 1972.
- L. Pignotti, Gli ultimi moduli della nuova poesia, edizioni Lerici, Milano 1972.
- E. Falqui, Novecento letterario italiano, volume V, editore Vallecchi, Firenze 1973.
- Mladen Machiedo, Orientamenti ideologico-estetici nella poesia italiana del dopoguerra, Facoltà di Filosofia dell'Università di Zagabria, 1973.
- G. Manacorda, Storia della letteratura italiana contemporanea (1940-1975), Editori Riuniti, Roma 1977.
- A. Frattini, Inchiesta sulla poesia, Edizioni Bastogi, Foggia.
- F. Manescalchi, L. Marcucci, La poesia italiana dagli anni ’40 al 1970, edizioni D’Anna, Firenze 1981.
- G. Barberi Squarotti, F. Spera, Letteratura italiana contemporanea, editore Lucarini, Roma 1982.

=== On his painting ===
- A. Frattini, Annuario della pittura Italiana, Istituto Europeo di Storia dell’Arte di Milano, 1964.
- A.T. Prete, Antologia Figurativa, edizioni Ers, Roma 1968.
- AA.VV., Enciclopedia Universale Seda della Pittura Moderna, edizioni Seda, Milano 1969.
- P. Bargellini, L'arte del ‘900, editore Vallecchi, Firenze 1971.
- AA.VV., Il mercato artistico italiano 1800-1900, edizioni Pinacoteca Torino, 1971.
- AA.VV., Enciclopedia Universale degli artisti 1970-1971, editrice Bugatti, Ancona 1971.
- V. Corti, Pittura contemporanea nelle collezioni private, edizioni Centro Internazionale Arti Figurative, Firenze 1971.
- M. Cennamo, Arte del XX secolo, edizioni Gabrielli, Roma 1973.
- T. Paloscia, La pittura toscana, editore Bolaffi Arte, Torino 1973.
- Adila Fontani, Il Movimento Eaista nel panorama culturale livornese del secondo dopoguerra, Thesis 2005-2006;
