= Chief Digital and Artificial Intelligence Office =

American defense artificial intelligence organization

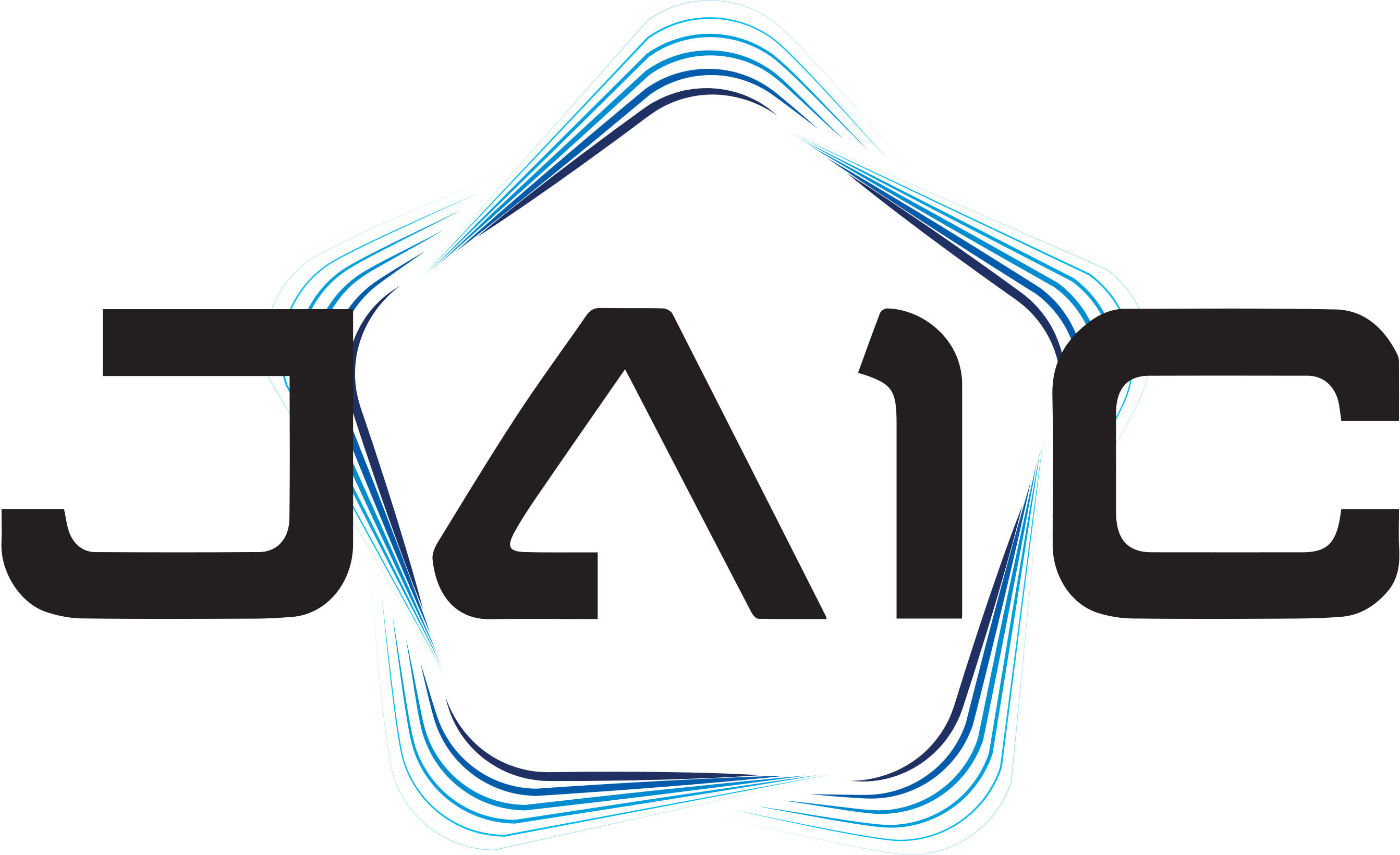

The Joint Artificial Intelligence Center (JAIC) (pronounced "jake") was an American organization on exploring the usage of artificial intelligence (AI) (particularly edge computing), network of networks and AI-enhanced communication for use in actual combat. In February 2022, JAIC was integrated into the Chief Digital and Artificial Intelligence Office (CDAO).

A subdivision of the United States Armed Forces, it was created in June 2018. The organization's stated objective was to "transform the US Department of Defense by accelerating the delivery and adoption of AI to achieve mission impact at scale. The goal is to use AI to solve large and complex problem sets that span multiple combat systems; then, ensure the combat Systems and Components have real-time access to ever-improving libraries of data sets and tools".

== History ==
JAIC was originally proposed to Congress on June 27, 2018; that same month, it was established under the Defense Department's chief information officer (CIO), itself subordinate to the Office of the Secretary of Defense (OSD), to coordinate Department-wide AI efforts. Throughout 2020, JAIC started financially engaging with the AI industry for the development of specific applications.

Current proposals for JAIC include giving it the authority as a financial entity to acquire its own technology, and elevating its position to be under the deputy secretary of defense.

On 24 June 2021 the Department of Defense gathered reporters for an AI symposium in which it announced the launch of an "AI and data accelerator (ADA) initiative" in which, over the month of July, data teams would work directly with military personnel to provide a proof of concept in data-driven warfare and to observe the possible obstacles for such implementation.

On 1 June 2022 JAIC, the Defense Digital Service, and the Office of Advancing Analytics were fully merged into a unified organization, the Chief Digital and Artificial Intelligence Officer (CDAO). JAIC, DDS, and the other groups within CDAO will cease to be recognized as entities.

== Successor ==
The first Chief Digital and Artificial Intelligence Office (CDAO) or Chief Digital and Artificial Intelligence Officer was Dr. Craig H. Martell. USAF secretary Frank Kendall has signalled that the CDAO will have an approach to solving the DoD-wide Joint All-Domain Command and Control (JADC2) problem: "Deputy Defense Secretary Kathleen Hicks has already asked Martell to take a leading role in the discussions about JADC2". Martell's approach is bottom-up starting with each agency, working one-by-one, preserving what is important for each agency. As of April 2023 connectivity between Nodes was the critical resource for JADC2. By February 2024 Dr Hicks announced that DoD had attained a minimum viable capability in JADC2.

Dr. Radha Iyengar Plumb assumed the CDAO role after the April 2024 departure of Dr. Martell.

=== Reaction to large language models ===
Dr. Martell has expressed apprehension over the large language models of AI such as ChatGPT.

US Air Force secretary Frank Kendall notes that AI tools to aid decision-making will likely find application. However the US will apply ethical constraints.

=== GIDEs ===
On 30 January 2023 the CDAO announced a series of global information dominance experiments (GIDEs). (Note: Four Global Information Dominance Experiments (GIDEs) were held from 2020 to 2021.) GIDE 5 is being held 30 January — 3 February 2023 (Monday—Thursday) at the Pentagon, and at multiple combatant commands (and therefore across the global information grid for JADC2). The experiment is twofold: 1) "to identify where we may have barriers in policy, security, connectivity, user-interface, or other areas that prohibit data sharing across the Joint force"; and 2) "to show how data, analytics, and AI can improve Joint workflows in a variety of missions from global integrated deterrence through targeting and fires".

GIDE 6 was held from June 5 to July 26, 2023, with allies and partners, to exercise Combined Joint All-domain command and control (CJADC2).

In GIDE 7, and in GIDE 8 more elements of the kill chains were exercised. In GIDE 9, which is aligned with Project Convergence C4 (2024), Combined JADC2 is almost ready for deployment, pending Congressional approval of FY2024 funding. By July 2024 11 GIDE experiments had been held.

A GIDE will be held during March and April 2025, in conjunction with Project Convergence Capstone 5 (PC-C5).

== Technology ==
=== AI-powered surveillance ===
The USAF has expressed interest in AI-based surveillance for operations based in CENTCOM. Interest in these operations has grown from $600 million to $2.5 billion, from 2016 to 2021.

=== Neuromorphic computing ===
JAIC's primary area of interest is edge computing, as even more sensor technologies are being added to weapon systems and military vehicles. The edge processors that will be used are neuromorphic processors that will perform neural network computations on the sensor itself without having to send the data to a central processor, thus increasing the robustness of the combat network. JAIC plans to access the U.S. commercial sector and academia to recruit professionals in the fields of neuromorphic technology and AI safety. See § data fabric

=== Network of networks ===
Joint All-Domain Command and Control (JADC2) is an initiative of the military's network of networks, as each branch of the US Armed Forces (Army, Air Force, Navy, Marines and Coast Guard) intends to have its own communications network. The JADC2 project would integrate all those networks into a larger network on all spatial scales. ′Connect every sensor, every shooter′, being the tagline. (Note: JADC2 has to connect the military services: "When you go to war, four DoD defense agencies — National Geospatial Intelligence Agency (NGA), Defense Intelligence Agency (DIA), Defense Information Systems Agency (DISA), and National Security Agency (NSA) — become Combat Support Agencies. They are part of the warfighting mechanism, so you need to include all the capabilities they bring to bear."— Scott Stapp)

JADC2 confers on the US the capability to "move data globally at scale". —Gen. Chance Saltzman, US Space Force

=== Joint Common Foundation ===
"The DoD’s Cloud-Based AI Development and Experimentation Platform"

== List of directors ==
No.	Director		Term			Service branch
No.	Portrait	Name	Took office	Left office	Term length	Service branch
1	John N.T. Shanahan	Lieutenant General; John N.T. Shanahan	1 December 2018	1 June 2020	~1 year, 183 days	U.S. Air Force
-	Nand Mulchandani	Nand Mulchandani	1 June 2020	1 October 2020	122 days	U.S. Senior; Executive Service
2	Michael S. Groen	Lieutenant General; Michael S. Groen	1 October 2020	19 May 2022	1 year, 230 days	U.S. Marine Corps
3	Craig H. MartellChief Digital and Artificial Intelligence Officer	Craig H. Martell; Chief Digital and Artificial Intelligence Officer	6 June 2022	31 March 2024	1 year, 299 days	U.S. Senior; Executive Service
4	Radha Iyengar PlumbChief Digital and Artificial Intelligence Officer	Radha Iyengar Plumb; Chief Digital and Artificial Intelligence Officer	9 April 2024	14 January 2025	280 days	U.S. Senior; Executive Service
5	Dr. Douglas MattyChief Digital and Artificial Intelligence Officer	Dr. Douglas Matty; Chief Digital and Artificial Intelligence Officer	21 April 2025	17 December 2025	240 days	U.S. Senior; Executive Service
6	Cameron StanleyChief Digital and Artificial Intelligence Officer	Cameron Stanley; Chief Digital and Artificial Intelligence Officer	12 January 2026	Incumbent	237 days	U.S. Senior; Executive Service
