= Enrique Omar Suárez =

- Other name: Caballo (horse)
- Occupations: Businessman, union leader, politician

Enrique Omar Suárez is an Argentine union leader, businessman, and politician. He is the previous Secretary General of SOMU (Sindicato de Obreros Marítimos Unidos), the Argentinian union for longshoremen and other maritime workers. He is also the president of Mercante SA and director of Maruba SCA, the largest shipping company in Argentina.

A longtime friend and ally of the nation's ruling Kirchner family, Suárez has been described as an “ultra-Menemista” who became a “hyper-Kirchnerista.” He has also been called a “Cristina-ista.” One source identifies him as “President Cristina Kirchner’s closest and most powerful ally.” He is accused by some sources as having been implicated in killings, shootings, narcotics trafficking, and various underworld activities. Nowadays he is in jail in Marcos Paz facility.

He is widely known by the nickname “Caballo” (horse).

== Early life and family ==
Suárez was born and raised in Monte Caseros, a town in the province of Corrientes, where he grew up in “a humble family.” His father was a carpenter, and his mother a hairdresser. He had two brothers and a sister. His brother Antonio, who was in turn president of the Social Work SOMU and head of the AFJP (Administradoras de Fondos de Jubilaciones y Pensiones) San José, died under “strange” circumstances but was ruled a suicide.

== Career ==
According to an official biographical account, Suárez began to work in SOMU in 1973 and after that worked in “various firms in the sector,” until 1987, when he was elected delegate and secretary of the Closed Section of SOMU. In 1989, he was elected Deputy Secretary General of SOMU, and in 1992 he was elected SOMU's Secretary General, a position he holds to this day. Several accounts state that Suárez was the chauffeur for his predecessor as Secretary General of SOMU, Juan Arce, and that he became Secretary General as a result of a 1989 building takeover by “armed thugs” who were members of the union. “His arrival in the union was, as is the mark of his entire career, through the gang,” comments one source, which adds that some of the “thugs” that put Suárez in his job continued to work under him, “negotiating with companies and squeezing opponents.”

Suárez was a candidate for Provincial Deputy for the New Party. Businessman Adolfo Navajas Artaza, who was governor of Corrientes in 1969-73 and was denounced for involvement in the disappearance of rural peasants who worked for his company, has been called Suárez's “political godfather.”

During the Menem years (1989–99), Suárez was “harshly questioned” when he and others signed an agreement on behalf of the Argentine Marines that accepted “poor working conditions” on ships flying under a Uruguayan flag of convenience.

In 2006, Suárez was elected president of the Mutual Association of SOMU. He is also a member of the Commission of Port, Maritime, and River Interests, and is heavily involved in the General Confederation of Labor of the Republic of Argentina (CGT). During his tenure at SOMU, he has also held various positions in the Argentina Confederation of Transport Workers (CATT), the Argentine Maritime Federation (FAMAR), the Caja de Asignaciones Familiares Portuarias y Maritímas (CAFPYMAR) and the Maritime Staff Social Work (OSPM). He is also the founder of la Escuela de Capacitación y Formación Marítima Omar Alberto Rupp, created in 1999 to upgrade the training of maritime workers.

Suárez became director of Maruba in October 2010, after Mercante SA announced that it would acquire a 30% stake in the firm, pending government approval.

Suárez has been criticized for signing agreements that resulted in lower wages and poorer working conditions and for spending $1.5 million on a recreational camp for union leaders, El Progreso, to which maritime workers are forbidden access.

A 2011 investigative report accused Suárez of having “invented” much of his past, and maintained that it was “a challenge” to determine his actual work history.

=== Smith International, 2010 ===
After Suárez became director of Maruba in October 2010, he used his position at SOMU to launch “a strong attack” on other companies in the sector, pressuring union shippers in the port of Buenos Aires to hire Maruba's tugboats instead of those belonging to the Dutch firm Smith International. Smith complained to Ricardo Lujan of the Secretariat for Ports and Waterways, but he refused to act against Suárez. Smith backed off from operations in Buenos Aires and sought instead to increase its presence in the port of Bahía Blanca, but Suárez then put on the pressure there, engineering strikes that made it impossible for Smith to meet its contracts; ultimately, Smith withdrew entirely from the Argentinian market. Its disappearance from Bahía Blanca improved the fortunes of local competitors but the port lost half of its tugboats, which increased the likelihood of delays.

=== Blockade, 2010 ===
In late 2010, SOMU blockaded Paraguayan trade in the port of Buenos Aires, and consequently about 7000 containers in transit to Paraguay had to wait nearly a month to be shipped to their destinations. Suárez said that SOMU had “the full support of the Cristina Kirchner administration” in implementing the blockade. He said that it was “a Kirchner government strategy to have Argentine pre-eminence in the Paraná-Paraguay river system” and that President Cristina Fernández de Kirchner had in fact “explicitly called for a boycott for five days in a gesture of solidarity” with Paraguayan maritime workers.

Suárez later denied having stated that the president supported the boycott. “I never said that. Clarín misrepresented my words," he maintained, and claimed that, on the contrary, he had told Clarín “that the president asked us to lift the blockade.” He said that the blockade had been undertaken in solidarity with Paraguayan maritime workers, because Paraguayan vessels “do not respect minimum and decent working conditions set out in international standards.” The Paraguayan counterpart to SOMU, however, announced that it was opposed to the blockade.

=== Blockade threat, 2011 ===
In the summer of 2011, Suárez threatened to blockade Paraguayan shipping to overcome “wage asymmetry” in Mercosur and “asymmetry in navigation” on the Paraná. The real goal of Suárez and the Argentinian government, it was claimed, was to compel shippers to switch several billion dollars’ worth of freight from Paraguayan firms to Maruba.

=== Bianchi criticisms, 2011 ===
In September 2011, Ivana Maria Bianchi, a member of the Argentinian Chamber of Deputies, filed a document with the Chamber of Deputies requesting an investigation of Suárez, listing several charges against him. According to Bianchi, Suárez had “launched a powerful attack against shipping, oil and grain” to promote SOMU and Maruba; had unsettled “the waters and the rules of the local maritime sector” with the support of the government of Christina Fernández de Kirchner; had frequently boasted that “everything that moves over the water is mine”; had “carried out a prolonged assault on the fishing industry in Mar del Plata” in 2008 in an effort to force it to yield to union demands; had pressured Maruba's competitors to cede business to it; had benefited from government favoritism in matters ranging from permits to contracts; and had “loot[ed] the coffers of the National Bank” to increase Argentinian shipbuilding and heighten the Argentinian maritime presence around the globe. Bianchi noted that Maruba, formerly “a company in deep economic problems,” had quickly turned successful as a result of government support, despite owning “virtually no Argentinian vessels” and having debts in ports around the world. Bianchi called Suárez “the most visible and militant face of the merchant marine.”

=== Strike, 2012 ===
SOMU called a strike on March 6, 2012, demanding higher staffing levels. “We don’t have anything to negotiate,” said Suárez. “They either assign the number of crew members that are necessary or the coast guard can do the work.” When the strike paralyzed maritime operations in Argentina, Suárez said: “Not one ship more will enter or leave.” As a result of the strike, soy futures soared on the Chicago Board of Trade.

=== U.K. boycott, 2012 ===
In February 2012, Suárez announced that SOMU would “cease to provide services to U.K. vessels as well as those of other nations hired by U.K.-based shipping companies,” owing to escalating tensions between Argentina and the U.K. over the Falkland Islands. “As workers we are totally offended by...the militarization of the South Atlantic,” Suárez said.

== Other activities ==
Suárez has been described as being responsible for “a lush handbook of deaths, drugs, and corruption.” When Eduardo Galantini was mayor of Monte Caseros, he was reportedly “threatened with death” because the municipality held land that was “coveted by Suárez.”

Suárez reportedly played a key role in Kirchnerist businessman Cristóbal López’s development of a nationwide gambling empire.

Politician, businessman, and union leader Luis Barrionuevo reportedly financed Suárez’s “Proyecto Corrientes,” a Peronist political organization in Suárez's home province.

=== Papal visit, 2013 ===
Suárez was one of ten or so members of the delegation that accompanied Cristina Fernández de Kirchner to Rome to meet with Pope Francis in 2013.

== Relationship with the Kirchners ==
Suárez and leaders of three other unions agreed in 2006 “to unify their efforts to support and deepen the national recovery policy promoted by the government of President Néstor Kirchner.” Suárez himself stated that the four unions were “in full accordance with the national direction of economic and social policy of President Néstor Kirchner and in full service to the reconstruction of the Argentine maritime sector.” Suárez said that “the unity of the major world trade unions” was “terrible news for the nostalgia of neoliberalism” and represented a success for the economic and social strategy of President Kirchner.

Mayor Javier Iud of San Antonio said in 2007 that it was important to work closely with Suárez on local issues because Suárez is “a ‘soldier’ of Cristina” and an “unconditional ally of CGT as he was under Néstor Kirchner.”

One source wrote in 2008 that Suárez was “now identified with Kirchner to the point that in the early months of the presidential campaign, he decorated the port area…with slogans reading ‘With him or with her, Kirchner president, SOMU driving. Omar Suárez.’”

Suárez took part in a labor-union tribute to Néstor Kirchner on the first anniversary of his death.

Suárez said in May 2011 that Argentina’s “historic” maritime presence around the world was a sign of "the remarkable recovery of Argentina at the hands of our President, Cristina Fernandez de Kirchner,” and was proof that “the Argentine people need four more years of Cristina.”

Suárez stated in April 2012 that in the elections for head of the CGT, scheduled for 2013, he would vote for the Kirchner candidate, not for current CGT leader Hugo Moyano, from whom, it was reported, he had recently been maintaining a “certain distance.”

Suárez stated in March 2014 that his goal as head of SOMU is “to recover a Néstor Kirchner Argentina that is a matrix of energy and development.”

Suárez has been described as using his contacts with the Casa Rosada to obtain credit at the National Bank to purchase ships from China.

Nowadays he is in jail in Marcos Paz facility.
