= Eaismo =

Avant-garde art movement in mid-century Italy

Eaismo (lit. 'atomic era-ism' (Note: From the initials of the Italian, era atomica.)) was a 20th-century avant-garde movement born in Italy in 1948, founded by the painter, Voltolino Fontani, who was the main representative of it, with the poet Marcello Landi, the literary critic Guido Favati and the painters Angelo Sirio Pellegrini and Aldo Neri.

It was also the Italian writer Carlo Cassola, to talk about Eaismo by writing some articles for the magazine "Il Mondo".

The Manifesto of Eaismo, signed also by the painters Angelo Sirio Pellegrini and Aldo Neri, highlighted the pessimism and the optimism of the Atomic Age, but was skeptical about the supposed revolutionary power of atomic energy.

The Manifesto of Eaismo, published in 1948, was followed by the Manifesto pittura nucleare by Enrico Baj (1951), and by the Mystical Manifesto, written by Salvador Dalí (1951).
