= Assistant Secretary of Defense for Space Policy =

U.S. Department of Defense official

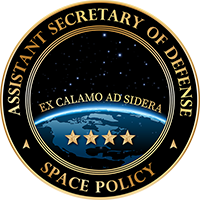
- Seal of the assistant secretary of defense for space policy

- Incumbent; Michael Gancio; Acting since September 30, 2026
- United States Department of Defense
- Abbreviation: ASD(SP)
- Reports to: Under Secretary of Defense for Policy
- Appointer: The president; with Senate advice and consent
- Term length: Appointed
- Constituting instrument: 10 U.S.C. § 138
- Formation: October 29, 2020
- First holder: John F. Plumb
- Website: Official website

The assistant secretary of defense for space policy (ASD(SP)) is a position in the United States Department of Defense responsible for the overall supervision of DoD policy for space warfighting. The officeholder reports to the under secretary of defense for policy.

== History ==
It was created by the Department of Defense on October 29, 2020 after it was mandated by the National Defense Authorization Act of 2019. Previously, there was a deputy assistant secretary for space policy position that reports to the assistant secretary of defense for homeland defense and Americas' security affairs. The acting assistant secretary of defense for space policy, Justin T. Johnson, was then appointed to perform the duties of the office.

== List of officeholders ==
=== Assistant secretaries of defense for space policy ===
No.	Assistant Secretary		Term			Ref.
No.	Portrait	Name	Took office	Left office	Term length	Ref.
Assistant Secretary of Defense for Space Policy
-	Justin T. Johnson	Justin T. Johnson; Acting	October 29, 2020	January 20, 2021	83 days	
-	John D. Hill	John D. Hill; Acting	January 20, 2021	March 7, 2022	1 year, 43 days	
1	John F. Plumb	John F. Plumb (born 1970/1971)	March 7, 2022	May 20, 2024	2 years, 77 days	
-	Vipin Narang	Vipin Narang; Acting	May 20, 2024	August 12, 2024	84 days	-
-	John D. Hill	John D. Hill; Acting	August 12, 2024	May 5, 2025	266 days	
-	Austin Dahmer	Austin Dahmer; Acting	May 5, 2025	May 22, 2025	17 days	-
-	Robert Soofer	Robert Soofer; Acting	May 22, 2025	July 10, 2025	49 days	-
-	Robert Brose	Robert Brose; Acting	July 10, 2025	January 5, 2026	179 days	-
2	Marc J. Berkowitz	Marc J. Berkowitz	January 5, 2026	September 30, 2026	268 days	-
-	Michael Gancio	Michael Gancio; Acting	September 30, 2026	Incumbent	14 days	-

=== Principal deputy assistant secretaries of defense for space policy ===
No.	PDASD		Term			Ref.
No.	Portrait	Name	Took office	Left office	Term length	Ref.
-	Gregory H. Pejic	Gregory H. Pejic; Acting	October 29, 2020	~December 20, 2020	~52 days	
1	Gregory H. Pejic	Gregory H. Pejic	~December 20, 2020	January 20, 2021	~31 days	
2	Vipin Narang	Vipin Narang	March 29, 2022	August 12, 2024	2 years, 136 days	
-	John D. Hill	John D. Hill; Acting	August 12, 2024	January 20, 2025	161 days	
-	Andrea Yaffe	Andrea Yaffe; Acting	January 20, 2025	June 12, 2025	143 days	-
-	Rachel McNeal	Rachel McNeal; Acting	June 12, 2025	August 7, 2026	1 year, 56 days	-
3	Michael Gancio	Michael Gancio	August 7, 2026	Incumbent	68 days	-

=== Deputy assistant secretaries of defense for space policy ===
No.	Deputy Assistant Secretary		Term			Ref.
No.	Portrait	Name	Took office	Left office	Term length	Ref.
Deputy Assistant Secretary of Defense for Space Policy
1	Gregory L. Schulte	Gregory L. Schulte	March 2010	~August 2012	~2 years, 153 days	
-	John F. Plumb	John F. Plumb; Acting	~August 2012	~March 2013	~212 days	
2	Douglas L. Loverro	Douglas L. Loverro	March 2013	January 20, 2017	~3 years, 311 days	
3	Stephen L. Kitay	Stephen L. Kitay	~June 13, 2017	August 21, 2020	~3 years, 69 days	
-	Justin T. Johnson	Justin T. Johnson; Acting	August 21, 2020	October 29, 2020	69 days	
