= Voltolino Fontani =

Italian painter

Voltolino Fontani (1920 in Livorno, Italia – 1976) was an Italian painter.

== Header ==
He was an artist who contributed to introduce the expression Atomic Age in the European culture. He was the founder of Eaismo, an artistic movement linking arts to Atomic Age.

In 1948, he published “Manifesto of Eaismo”, anticipating the Manifesto of Pittura nucleare by Enrico Baj (1951), and Salvador Dalí (Manifesto mistico, 1951).

== Bibliography ==
- Carlo Emanuele Bugatti, Voltolino Fontani, Bugatti editore, Ancona, 1972
- Michele Pierleoni (edited by), in collaboration with Archivio Voltolino Fontani, with contributions by Adila Fontani and Riccardo Rossi Menicagli, The vision of the landscape in Voltolino Fontani between expressionism and oneiric, catalog published by the BCC of Castagneto Carducci for the centenary of the artist's birth, Livorno, 3 October 2020
