= Sergio Dangelo =

Italian painter (1932–2022)

- Born: 19 April 1932; Milan, Italy
- Died: 4 January 2022 (aged 89); Milan, Italy
- Occupation: Painter

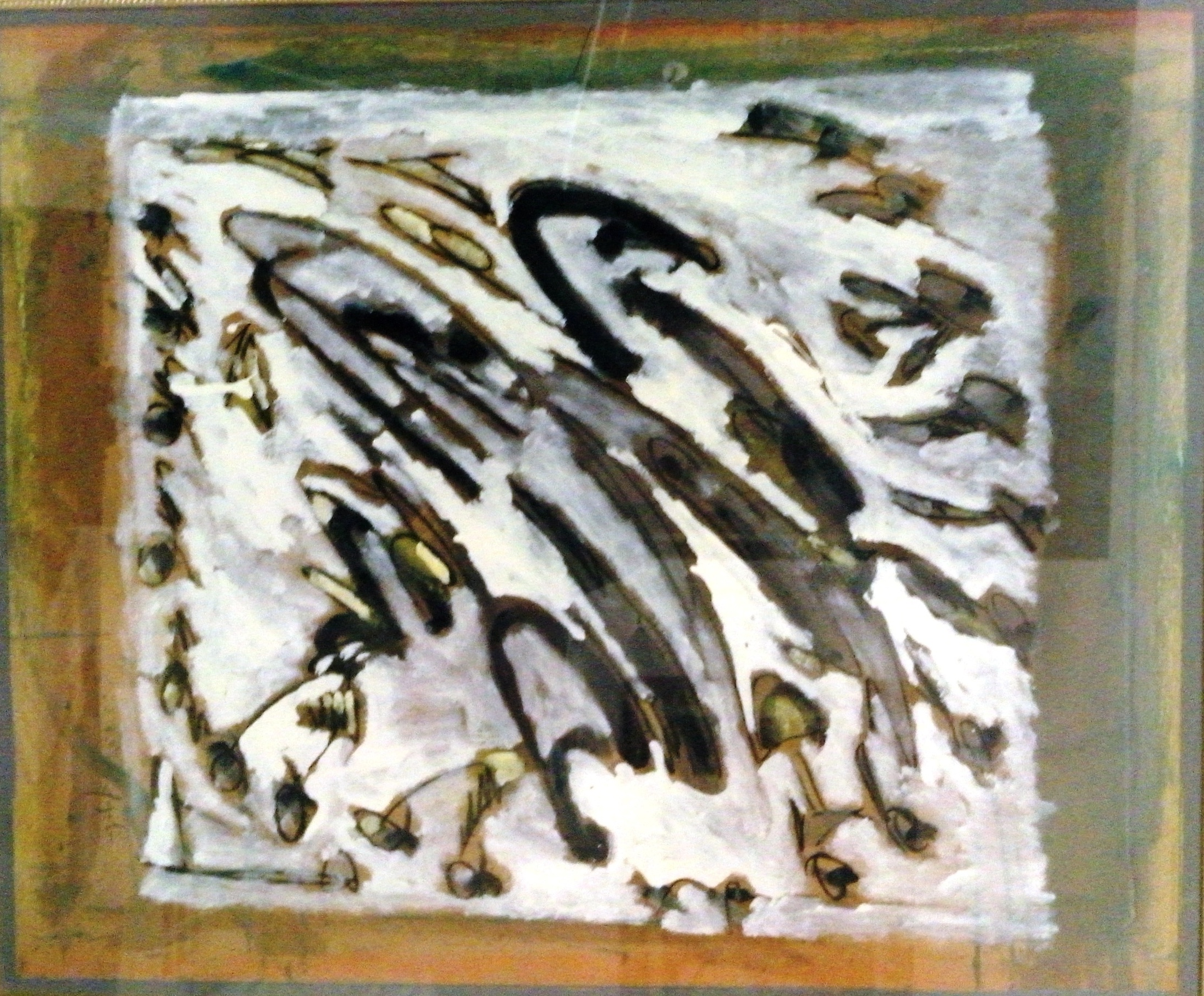
Le Vespe, 1954

Sergio Dangelo (19 April 1932 – 4 January 2022) was an Italian surrealistic painter and illustrator. He was the founder of the Arte nucleare movement, part of the nuclear art tendency, and was a co-founder of the International Movement for an Imaginist Bauhaus.

== Life and career ==
Born in Milan, Dangelo made his studies between Italy, France and Switzerland, and lived for several years in Brussels, where he got in contact with surrealist and avant-garde circles, notably the COBRA group. Back in his hometown, in 1951 Dangelo founded with Enrico Baj the Arte nucleare movement, and held his first solo exhibition at the Galleria San Fedele in Milan. In 1953 he founded with Baj and Asger Jorn the International Movement for an Imaginist Bauhaus and in 1954 he founded with them and organized in Albisola the Incontri Internazionali della Ceramica (International Meetings of Ceramics).

Besides his "nuclear paintings", Dangelo is well known for the “Hand-made” (a name given to them by Marcel Duchamp in 1960), i.e. a series of collage paintings composed of fragments of various objects and materials. His works were exposed in numerous art festivals, including the São Paulo Art Biennial, the Biennale de Paris, the Rome Quadriennale and six editions of the Venice Biennale.

Dangelo died in Milan on 4 January 2022, at the age of 89.

== Collections ==
Dangelo's work is included in the permanent collection of the National Gallery of Art in Washington DC, the Israel Museum, and in the Museo MAGA in Gallarate, Italy.
