= Vipin Narang =

American political scientist

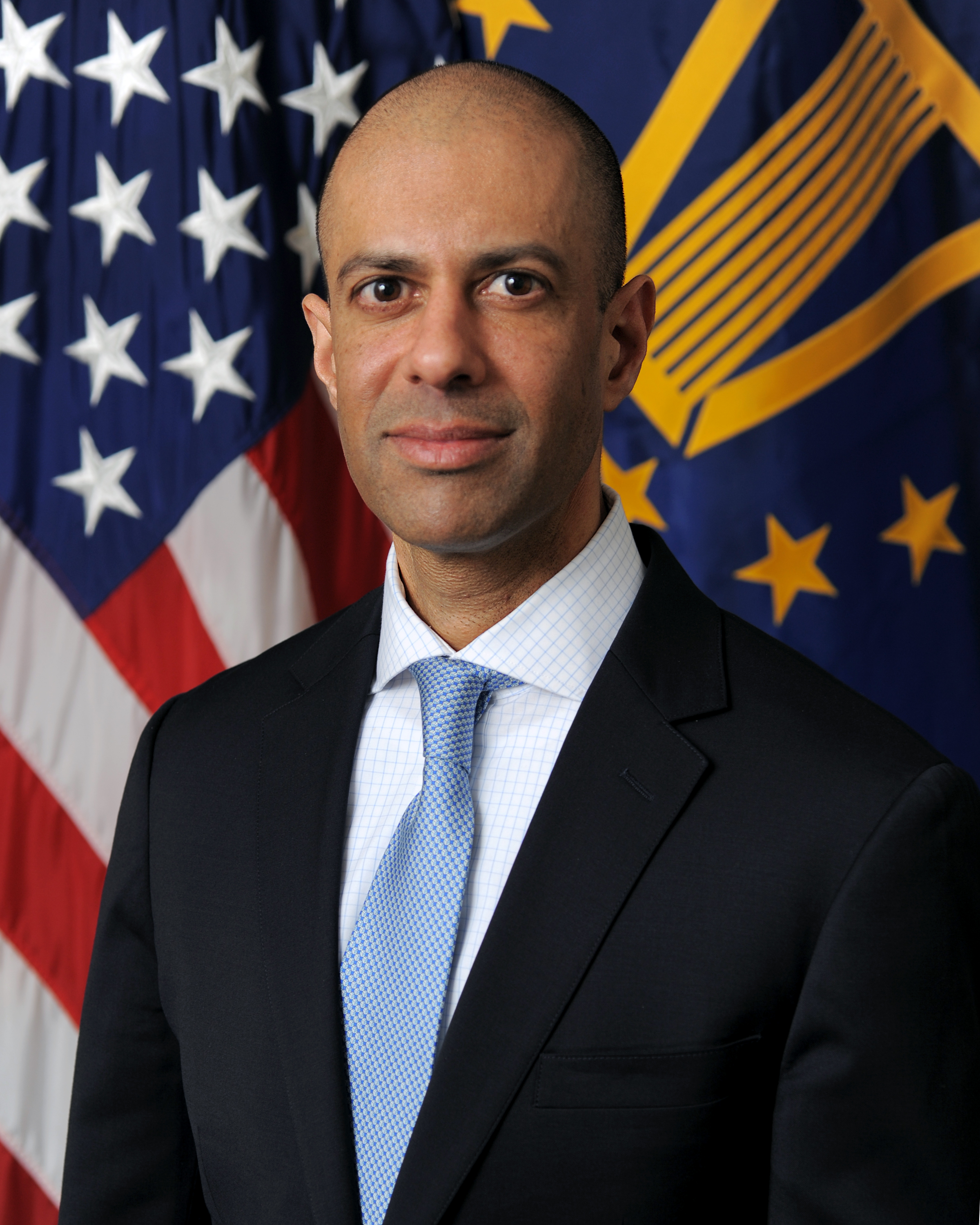
- Official portrait, 2022

Assistant Secretary of Defense for Space Policy
- Acting
- In office May 20, 2024 – August 12, 2024
- President: Joe Biden
- Preceded by: John F. Plumb
- Succeeded by: John D. Hill (Acting)

Principal Deputy Assistant Secretary of Defense for Space Policy
- In office March 29, 2022 – August 12, 2024
- President: Joe Biden
- Preceded by: Gregory H. Pejic
- Succeeded by: Michael Gancio

Personal details
- Born: Jamestown, New York, U.S.

Vipin Narang is an American political scientist who served as the Acting Assistant Secretary of Defense for Space Policy until August 2024, a portfolio that includes space and missile defense policy as well as nuclear deterrence and countering weapons of mass destruction policy. He is a Professor of Political Science at MIT. He is known for his research on nuclear weapons, conflict and proliferation. His research has shown that there are different nuclear weapons postures. These postures have implications for the likelihood of conflict between nuclear states, as well as bargaining outcomes in disputes.

He has a BS and MS in Chemical Engineering from Stanford University, as well as a M.Phil in International Relations from University of Oxford as a Marshall Scholar and a PhD. from Harvard University. He was born in the San Francisco Bay Area to parents of Indian descent.
