= Gregory Schulte =

American government official (born 1958)

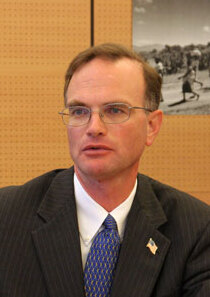
Gregory L. Schulte (2009)

Gregory L. Schulte (born 1958) was the U.S. ambassador to the International Atomic Energy Agency from July 2005 through June 2009. Schulte served as the Permanent Representative of the United States to the United Nations Office at Vienna, the International Atomic Energy Agency, and other international organizations in Vienna. Assuming his post on July 13, 2005, Schulte was charged with advancing the President's agenda in countering proliferation, terrorism, organized crime, and corruption, while promoting the peaceful use of nuclear energy.

Appointed by President George W. Bush in January 2003, Schulte served as Executive Secretary of the National Security Council (NSC) through March 2005. He was accountable to Condoleezza Rice for overseeing the NSC staff, the national security decision-making process, and the White House Situation Room.

Schulte served as Senior Director for Southeast European Affairs on the NSC staff from 2000 to 2002, overseeing U.S. diplomacy and military deployments in Bosnia and Kosovo and collaboration with the United Nations and European Union. He helped guide and coordinate interagency efforts to bring democracy to Serbia and prevent civil war in Macedonia.

From 1999 to 2000, Schulte served as Principal Director for Requirements, Plans and Counterproliferation Policy in the Office of the Secretary of Defense at The Pentagon. His duties included review of U.S. war plans and policy oversight of efforts to protect U.S. and allied forces in the face of nuclear, biological, and chemical threats.

As Special Assistant to the President for Implementation of the Dayton Peace Accords on the NSC staff from 1998 to 1999, Schulte coordinated U.S. diplomacy and support for the NATO air campaign that stopped ethnic cleansing in Kosovo. He co-chaired the NSC Executive Committee that planned for the subsequent UN and NATO missions in Kosovo.

From 1992 to 1998, Schulte was assigned to the NATO International Staff in Belgium. As Director of the Bosnia Task Force, he helped prepare NATO's first "out of area" operations and manage its relations with the United Nations, Russia, and other Partner countries. He worked with NATO political and military authorities to develop guidance for air strikes in Bosnia, deployment of IFOR, and transition to SFOR. He simultaneously served as Director for Nuclear Planning, assisting in the restructuring of NATO's nuclear weapons posture after the Cold War.

Schulte worked for the Secretary of Defense from 1985 to 1992 as Director for Strategic Forces Policy and Assistant for Theater Nuclear Forces Policy. He contributed to two nuclear weapons treaties, two Presidential Nuclear Initiatives, a Strategic Targeting Review, a Failsafe and Risk Reduction Review, and NATO's Nuclear Planning Group.

In 2020, Schulte, along with over 130 other former Republican national security officials, signed a statement that asserted that President Trump was unfit to serve another term, and "To that end, we are firmly convinced that it is in the best interest of our nation that Vice President Joe Biden be elected as the next President of the United States, and we will vote for him."
