= Joint All-Domain Command and Control =

U.S. defense initiative to connect armed forces sensors into a unified network

Joint All-Domain Command and Control, or JADC2, is a concept in active development by the United States Department of Defense to link sensors from all branches of the United States Armed Forces into a unified network powered by artificial intelligence.

Each branch of the United States Armed Forces has its own initiative that contributes directly to JADC2: the Army has Project Convergence, the Navy has Project Overmatch, the Air Force has the Advanced Battle Management System (ABMS), and the Space Force has the National Defense Space Architecture (NDSA), which is being developed by the Space Development Agency.

One primary application of JADC2 is a call for fire (CFF) request. (Note: In 2009 the US Army replaced command and control with mission command, in which the commander's intent suffices to empower subordinate unit commanders. This requires transparency of the command, and trust in the subordinates. For example, suppose the subordinate is a squad leader; A forward observer (FO) in the squad requests fires (Call for fire -CFF); the CFF is a request, not an order. The fire direction center (FDC) reads back the data in 3 parts, as the forward observer sends the request: 1. Observer identification and warning order.; 2. Target location.; 3. Description of target, method of engagement, and method of fire and control.) Combined JADC2 was prepared for deployment, pending congressional approval of FY2024 funding.

== Experimentation ==
The DoD has held at least two JADC2 exercises. The first demonstration of ABMS during an exercise in Florida in December 2019 centered on simulated threats posed by cruise missiles. Air Force and Navy aircraft (including F-22 and F-35 fighter jets), a Navy destroyer, an Army Sentinel radar system, a mobile artillery system, and commercial space and ground sensors demonstrated their ability to collect, analyze, and share data in real time to provide a more comprehensive picture of the operating environment. For more information, see JADC2 at the Army's Project Convergence experiments

In July 2020, the Department of Defense carried out a second test of the JADC2 system. During this exercise, Air Force planes communicated with naval vessels stationed in the Black Sea. Additionally, special operations personnel from eight other NATO nations collaborated in a simulated environment to deter a possible attack from Russia.

In November 2022, ABMS experiments demonstrated combined arms concepts within JADC2, according to Brig. Gen. Jeffery Valenzia, USAF CFT lead for JADC2.

== Infrastructure ==
In 2017, a joint network (Joint Enterprise Defense Infrastructure—JEDI) was proposed for the DoD, with a single contract worth $10 billion intended for one vendor. Competitive bidding was held, and an award was made, but a competitor protested the award. In 2021, the award was canceled; by 2022, a replacement network capability that would support multiple interoperable vendors through multiple awards was envisioned. This capability, the Joint Warfighting Cloud Capability (JWCC), was expected to involve $9 billion spread among vendors, with the awards scheduled for mid-December 2022. Pentagon network officials began to envision JWCC as a necessary layer for JADC2. In early December 2022, JWCC contracts were awarded to Google, Amazon, Microsoft, and Oracle.

DISA (Defense Information Systems Agency) was embarking on an upgrade to its JWICS (Joint Worldwide Intelligence Communications System), which is classified as top secret. DISA was using the same vendors as for JWCC, as well as IBM. Combining JWICS with JWCC allowed economies of scale through a cooperative project involving DISA's JWICS and DoD's JWCC. A top-secret capability is being sought.

== JADC2 Services ==
Decision superiority is an objective of CDAO. By fiscal year 2023, other Electromagnetic Battle Management System (EBMS) services had become available in JADC2. Raytheon BBN demonstrated its Robust Information Provisioning Layer (RIPL), which connects legacy links to ABMS.

A theater-level simulation tool will share data under a Cooperative Research and Development Agreement (CRADA) to visualize JADC2 scenarios.

According to the acting head of the Network CFT, Integrated Tactical Network (ITN) Capability Set '25 will implement JADC2. (Note: Call For Fire (CFF))

The Air Force's Common Tactical Edge Network brings together 9 contractors to exploit AI. Collins Aerospace demonstrated Combined JADC2 (CJADC2) in July 2022. (Note: Echelons above brigade (division, corps, and theater army) engage in a continuum of conflict. (Note: Colin Clark (18 Feb 2020) Gen. Hyten On The New American Way of War: All-Domain Operations (ADO): "A computer-coordinated fight": in the air, land, sea, space, cyber, and the electromagnetic spectrum (EMS); "forces from satellites to foot soldiers to submarines sharing battle data at machine-to-machine speed"; "it's the ability to integrate and effectively command and control all domains in a conflict or in a crisis seamlessly"—Gen. Hyten, Vice Chairman of the Joint Chiefs; All-Domain Operations (ADO) use global capabilities: "space, cyber, deterrent [the nuclear triad (for mutually assured destruction in the Cold War, an evolving concept in itself)], transportation, electromagnetic spectrum operations, missile defense".) (Note: Sydney J. Freedberg Jr. (November 22, 2019) SecArmy's Multi-Domain Kill Chain: Space-Cloud-AI Army Multi-Domain Operations Concept, December 2018 slide from TRADOC pamphlet 525-3-1 (Dec 2018).: In September 2020, an ABMS Onramp demonstrated a specific scenario, which can be illustrated by the five red numbered bullet points from the slide in TRADOC pamphlet 525-3-1: 1. Competition— No overt hostilities are yet detected. Blue bar (force projection) is in standoff against red bar (threat).; 2. Strategic Support area— National assets (blue) detect breaching of standoff by adversary (in red).; 3. Close area support— blue assets hand-off to the combatant commands, who are to create effects visible to the adversary (in red).; 4. Deep maneuver— blue combatant actions dis-integrate adversary efforts (per TRADOC pamphlet 525-3-1: "militarily compete, penetrate, dis-integrate, and exploit" the adversary); —Operational and Strategic deep fires create effects on the adversary. Adversary is further subject to defeat in detail, until adversaries perceive they are overmatched (no more red assets to expend).; 5. Adversary retreats to standoff. The populations perceive that the adversary is defeated, for now. (Compare to Perkins' cycle, 'return to competition', in which deterrence has succeeded in avoiding a total war, in favor of pushing an adversary back to standoff (the red threat bar). Blue force projection still has overmatched red threat.))) (Note: The Army's unclassified Multi-Domain Operations (MDO) concept is "the combined arms employment of capabilities from all domains that create and exploit relative advantages to defeat enemy forces, achieve objectives and consolidate gains during competition, crisis, and armed conflict".)

The Navy's Live, Virtual, and Constructive (LVC) environment is used to train Navy, Air Force, and Army personnel together for naval operations.

In Large Scale Exercise 2023, held from August 9 to August 18, the Navy will test the response of over 50 Navy commands spread across 22 time zones, using retired Navy admirals to simulate members of the Joint Staff, civilian leaders, and non-Navy personnel.
For example, aboard the aircraft carrier USS Eisenhower (CVN-69), the ship's watchstanding crew can train using events presented on the screens of the Combat Information Center (CIC), regardless of the ship's physical location during Large Scale Exercise 2023. The Navy's Project Overmatch is now installed on three carrier strike groups for Project Convergence Capstone 4 (PCC4), held in 2024.

The following material is split from Army Futures Command

Multi-domain operations (MDO); joint warfighting concept (JADC2)

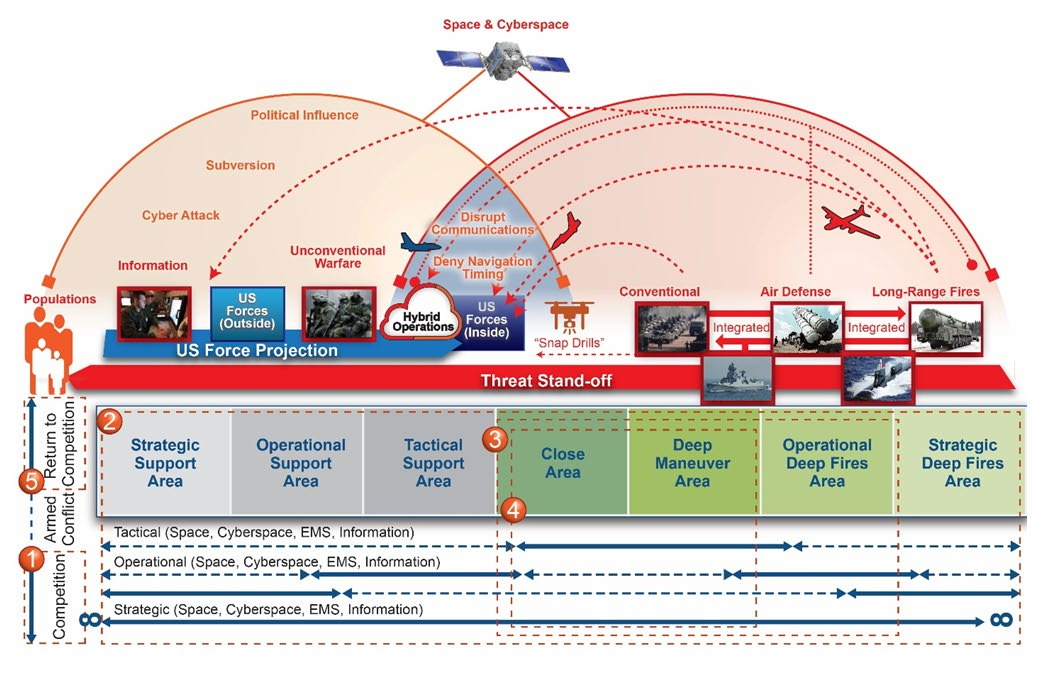
Multi-domain operations (MDO) span multiple domains: cislunar space, land, air, maritime, cyber, and populations.

Multi-Domain Operations (MDO): Joint planning and operations are also part of the DoD's impending emphasis on multi-domain operations. Multi-domain battalions, (Note: When used in multi-domain operations, I2CEWS denotes Intelligence, Information, Cyber, Electronic Warfare, and Space. See: ISR, or Intelligence, surveillance and reconnaissance, and National Geospatial-Intelligence Agency) first stood up in 2019, comprise a single unit for the air, land, space, and cyber domains. A hypersonic-based battery similar to a THAAD battery is under consideration for this type of battalion, possibly denoted a strategic fires battalion (however, I2CEWS support would likely be needed), depending on the theater. In 2019, these capabilities were analyzed as part of a series of globally integrated exercises. Using large-scale simulations, the need for a new kind of command and control (now denoted JADC2) to integrate this firepower was explored.

- The ability to punch through any standoff defense of a near-peer competitor is the goal that Futures Command is seeking. For example, the combination of F-35-based targeting coordinates, long-range precision fires, and low-Earth-orbit satellite capability overmatches the competition, according to Lt. Gen. Wesley. Critical decisions to meet this goal will be made based on the results of the Army's ongoing tests of the prototypes under development.
- For example, in Long Range Precision Fires (LRPF), the director of the LRPF CFT envisions one application as an anti-access/area denial (A2AD) probe, which would spare resources for the other services. By firing a munition with a thousand-mile range at an adversary, LRPF would force the adversary to respond, exposing the locations of its countermeasures and potentially the location of its headquarters. In that situation, an adversary's headquarters would not survive for long, and its forces would be subject to defeat in detail. However, LRPF is only one part of a combatant commander's strategy for achieving overmatch.
- In August–September 2020, at Yuma Proving Ground, the US Army conducted a five-week exercise to rapidly merge multiple-domain capabilities. The exercise prototyped a ground tactical network and pushed it to its limits of robustness. As of 2020, the network had a range of 36 miles on the ground and demonstrated a capability of 1,500 miles above ground, with kill chains measured in seconds, as part of an effort to penetrate anti-access/area denial (A2AD) defenses with long-range fires. Longer-range fires are under development, ranging from hundreds of miles to over 1,000 miles, with yearly iterations of Project Convergence planned.
  - MDO (multi-domain operations) and JADC2 (joint all-domain command and control) thus entail:
    1. Penetrate phase: satellites detect enemy shooters
    2. Dis-integrate phase: airborne assets remove enemy long-range fires
    3. Kinetic effect phase: Army shooters, using targeting data from aircraft and other sensors, fire on enemy targets.
  - Army Chief of Staff Gen. James C. McConville will discuss the combination of MDO and JADC2 with Air Force Chief of Staff Gen. Charles Q. Brown. In October 2020, the chiefs agreed that Futures Command and the Air Force's A5 office would lead a two-year collaboration "at the most 'basic levels' by defining mutual standards for data sharing and service interfacing" in the development of Combined Joint All-Domain Command and Control (CJADC2).
    - The ability of the joint services to send data from machine to machine was exercised in front of several of the Joint Chiefs of Staff in April 2021; this is a prerequisite for the convergence of MDO and JADC2.
- In July 2022, the 7th ASA(ALT), Doug Bush, called for the formation of a large office on the scale of the Joint Counter-small UAS office, but for JADC2. This would coordinate and eventually reconcile JADC2 requirements across the Army's Project Convergence, the Navy's Project Overmatch, and the Air Force's Advanced Battle Management System. See CDAO

In April 2023, Joint Warfighting Concept 3.0 (JWC 3.0) was previewed. JWC 2.0 involved fires, information, logistics, and command and control. Released on 27 August 2023, JWC 3.0 additionally involves the ability to win in contested logistics, achieve information advantage, and expand maneuver, according to ADM Christopher Grady. The employment of crewed-uncrewed teaming to 'sense and make sense' of the situation and to make that information rapidly available to commanders will be an essential part of the capability. Future Force Design is underway.

On 19 September 2023, Army Contracting Command-Aberdeen Proving Ground awarded Leidos a contract to provide an electronic platform, equipment, and services in support of JADC2.

In February 2024, the Air Force's Brig. Gen. Luke Cropsey warned that phase two of Combined JADC2, which was supposed to go forward in 2024, was not starting because continuing resolutions (CRs) did not fund new program spending. Full congressional budget approval for FY2024 was required for Combined JADC2 to proceed.

== Outernet ==
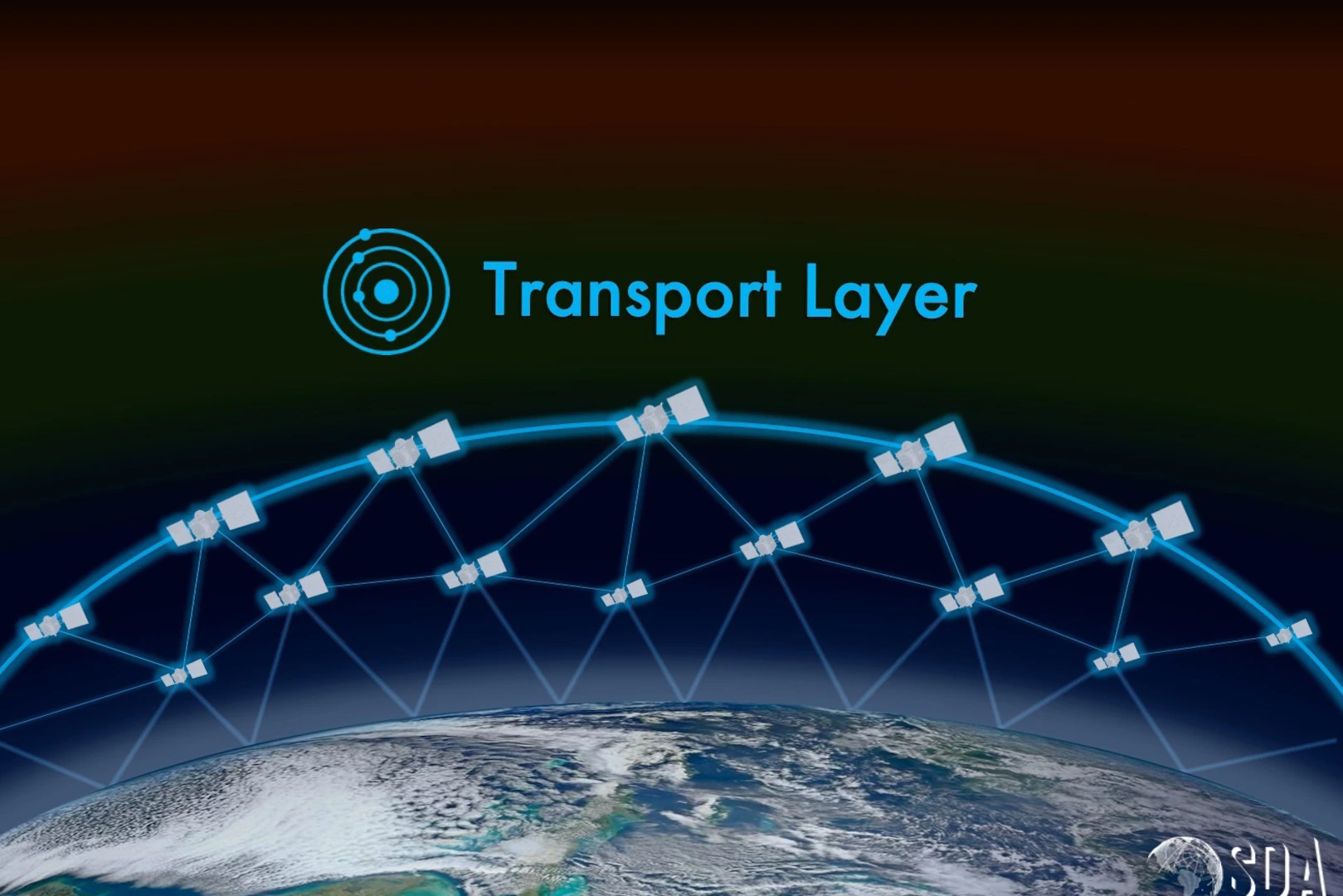
Transport layer of the National Defense Space Architecture (NDSA)

JADC2 confers on the US the capability to "move data globally at scale", according to General Chance Saltzman of the US Space Force. By year-end 2025, there will be 126 Link-16 satellites operating in orbit, transmitting data in a worldwide mesh network.

== See also ==
- C4I
- Defense Technical Information Center
