= Adolfo Navajas Artaza =

Argentine businessman and politician (1925–2022)

Minister of Social Action
- In office 22 September 1982 – 10 December 1983
- Preceded by: Carlos Lacoste
- Succeeded by: Aldo Neri (as Minister of Health and Social Action)

Governor of Corrientes Province
- In office 7 June 1969 – 11 January 1973
- Preceded by: Hugo Arnaldo Garay Sánchez
- Succeeded by: Roberto Tiscornia

Personal details
- Born: 26 May 1925; Gobernador Virasoro, Argentina
- Died: 2 August 2022 (aged 97)
- Political party: Independent
- Occupation: Businessman

Adolfo Navajas Artaza (26 May 1925 – 2 August 2022) was an Argentine businessman and politician. An independent, he served as Governor of Corrientes Province from 1969 to 1973 and was Minister of Social Action from 1982 to 1983.

Navajas died on 2 August 2022, at the age of 97.
