= John F. Plumb =

American aerospace engineer

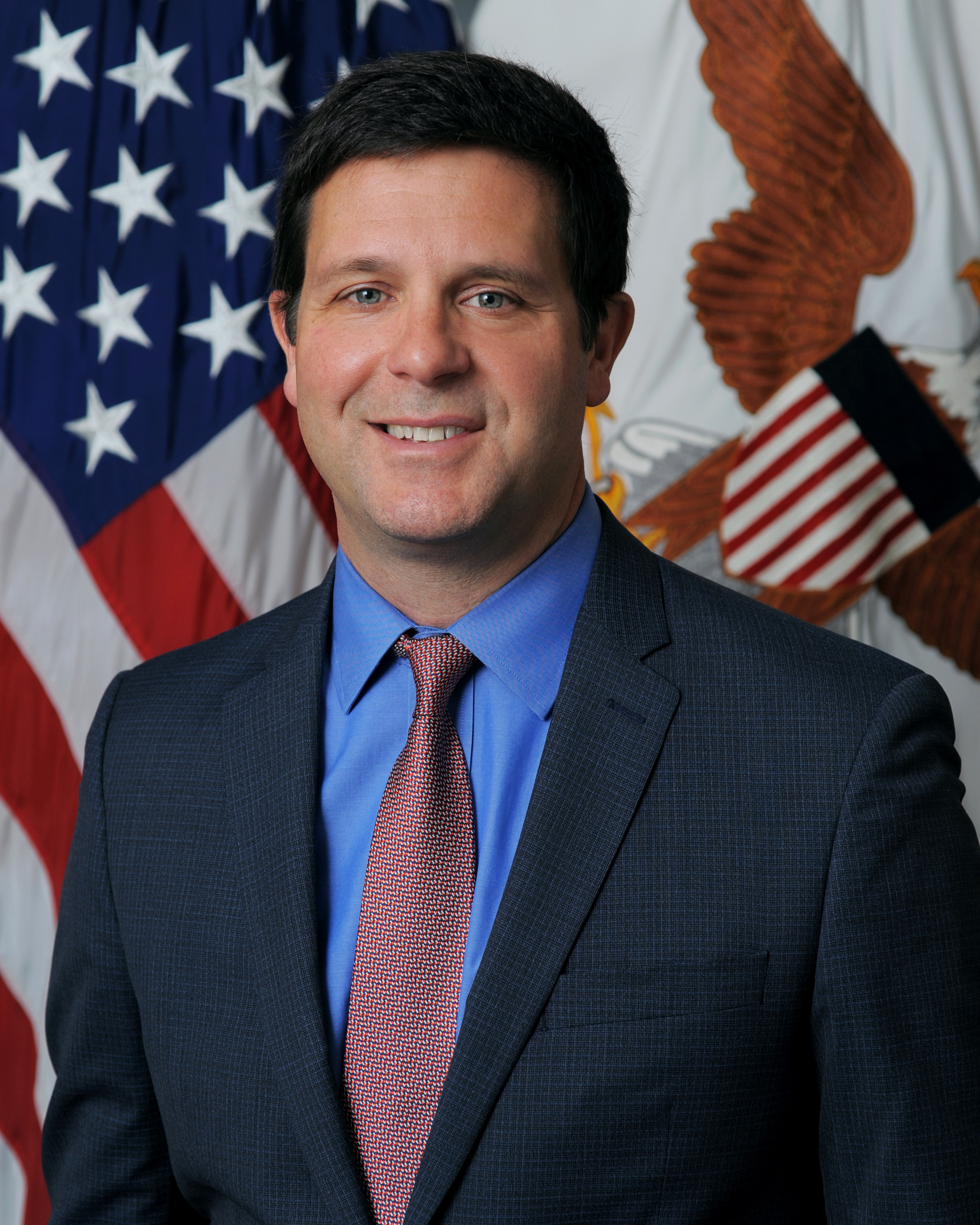
- Official portrait, 2022

Assistant Secretary of Defense for Space Policy
- In office March 7, 2022 – May 20, 2024
- President: Joe Biden
- Preceded by: Position established
- Succeeded by: Marc J. Berkowitz

Personal details
- Born: 1970 or 1971 (age 54–55) Jamestown, New York
- Party: Democratic
- Spouse: Radha Iyengar Plumb
- Education: University of Notre Dame (BS); University of Colorado Boulder (MS), (PhD)

Military service
- Allegiance: United States
- Branch: United States Navy (1993–2000); United States Navy Reserve (2000–present)
- Years of service: 1993–present
- Rank: Captain
- John F. Plumb's voice Plumb's opening statement at a House Armed Services Strategic Forces Subcommittee hearing on the FY2024 nuclear forces budget request Recorded March 28, 2023

John F. Plumb (born 1970/1971) is an American aerospace engineer, politician, and United States Navy Reserve captain who served as the first assistant secretary of defense for space policy. He was previously the chief of government relations at The Aerospace Corporation. In 2016, he unsuccessfully ran as the Democratic Party candidate for the 23rd congressional district in New York.

== Education ==
Plumb was born in Jamestown, New York. He graduated from the University of Notre Dame in 1992 with a Bachelor of Science degree in physics. He later earned a Master of Science degree in physics and a PhD in aerospace engineering from the University of Colorado Boulder.

== Career ==
Plumb has served in both active and reserve duty as a submarine officer. After graduating, Plumb was commissioned in the United States Navy in 1993 and, in 2000, he moved to the United States Navy Reserve. He holds the rank of captain and serves as the commanding officer Commander, Submarine Force, U.S. Pacific Fleet Undersea Warfare Operations Headquarters.

Plumb has worked for more than 25 years at various positions in the White House, the Pentagon, and the United States Senate. From 2004 to 2009, he worked under Colorado Senator Ken Salazar first as a congressional science and technology fellow, then as a legislative assistant. He worked for the United States Department of Defense from 2009 to 2013 on nuclear, missile defense, and space policy. In 2013, he started working for the National Security Council as director of defense policy and strategy.

Plumb left the National Security Council in 2015 to run as the Democratic Party candidate for the 23rd congressional district in New York, challenging the Republican incumbent, Tom Reed. He lost to Reed by 42,466 votes.

After losing the election, Plumb then worked for RAND Corporation as a senior engineer. In August 2020, he was hired by The Aerospace Corporation as the chief of government relations.

=== Biden administration ===
On July 29, 2021, Joe Biden nominated Plumb to serve as the first Assistant Secretary of Defense for Space Policy. He testified before the Senate Armed Services Committee on January 13, 2022, where he agreed that the space traffic-management mission of the Space Force should be transferred to a civil agency. He was confirmed by voice vote on March 1, 2022.
