= Aldo Neri =

Argentine politician (1930–2023)

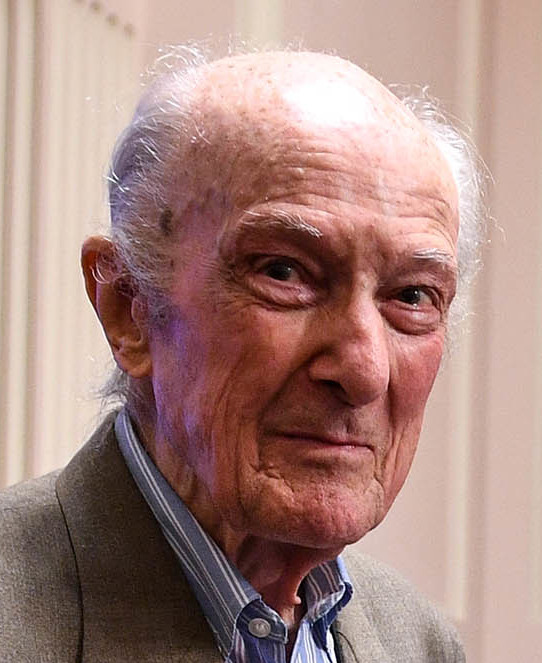
- Neri in 2019

Minister of Health and Social Action
- In office 10 December 1983 – 15 April 1986
- President: Raúl Alfonsín
- Preceded by: Horacio Rodríguez Castells (as Minister of Health); Adolfo Navajas Artaza (as Minister of Social Action)
- Succeeded by: Conrado Storani

Personal details
- Born: Aldo Carlos Neri; 19 October 1930 Bahía Blanca, Buenos Aires Province, Argentina
- Died: 21 September 2023 (aged 92) Buenos Aires, Argentina
- Party: UCR
- Education: University of Buenos Aires
- Occupation: Doctor

Aldo Carlos Neri (19 October 1930 – 21 September 2023) was an Argentine doctor and politician. A member of the Radical Civic Union, he served as Minister of Health and Social Action from 1983 to 1986.

Neri died in Buenos Aires on 21 September 2023, at the age of 92.
