= Radha Iyengar Plumb =

American government official

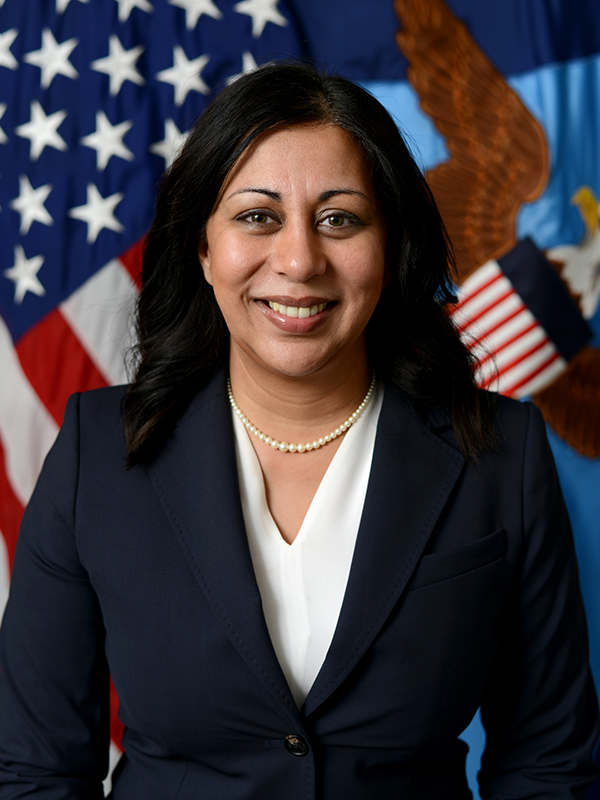
- Official portrait, 2023

Deputy Under Secretary of Defense for Acquisition and Sustainment
- In office April 21, 2023 – April 8, 2024
- President: Joe Biden
- Preceded by: Alan Shaffer

Personal details
- Party: Democratic
- Spouse: John F. Plumb
- Education: Massachusetts Institute of Technology (BS); Princeton University (MS), (PhD)

Radha Iyengar Plumb is an American government official who served as the chief digital and artificial intelligence officer in the U.S. Department of Defense. She previously served as Deputy Under Secretary of Defense for Acquisition and Sustainment. She was confirmed for that position by the U.S. Senate on April 18, 2023 and assumed office later that month.

She was formerly the chief of staff to the Deputy Secretary of Defense.

== Education ==
Plumb has a Ph.D. and MS in Economics from Princeton University and a BS from the Massachusetts Institute of Technology.

== Career ==
Plumb started her career as an assistant professor at the London School of Economics. She then became the director of research and insights for trust and safety at Google. She also worked as the global head of policy analysis at Facebook. She has been a senior economist at RAND Corporation and has also held senior staff positions at the Department of Defense, Department of Energy, and the White House National Security Council. She co-hosted the Bombshell podcast for several years along with Erin Simpson and Loren DeJonge Schulman.

=== Biden administration nomination ===
On June 15, 2022, President Joe Biden nominated Plumb to be deputy undersecretary of defense for acquisition and sustainment. Hearings were held before the Senate Armed Services Committee on July 28, 2022. During that hearing, Senator Dan Sullivan placed a hold on Plumb's nomination over a dispute with the Biden administration over a mining project in his home state of Alaska. The committee favorably reported Plumb's nomination to the Senate floor on September 28, 2022. Plumb's nomination expired at the end of the year and was returned to President Biden on January 3, 2023.

Plumb was renominated the same day. The committee favorably reported Plumb's nomination to the Senate floor on February 9, 2023.

But later in February, Sen. Tommy Tuberville, R-Alabama, placed a hold on all Defense Department nominations and general officer promotions because he disagrees with new department policies that help troops travel for abortion if they serve in states that heavily restrict abortion.

On April 17, 2023, the United States Senate invoked cloture on her nomination by a 61–26 vote. On April 18, 2023, her nomination was confirmed by a 68–30 vote.

In April 2024, Plumb resigned her deputy undersecretary position to assume the role of chief digital and artificial intelligence officer.

In September 2025, she was named a Distinguished Visiting Fellow with the World Perry House at the University of Pennsylvania.

== Personal life ==
Plumb is married to John F. Plumb, who as of 2023 served in another post within the United States Department of Defense.
