= Enrico Baj =

Italian painter, sculptor and writer (1924–2003)

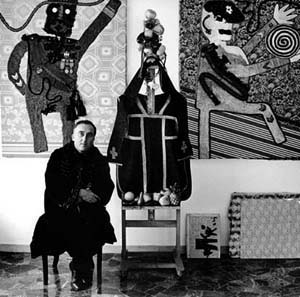
Baj in 1964

Enrico Baj (31 October 1924 – 16 June 2003) was an Italian artist and writer on art. Many of his works show an obsession with nuclear war. He created prints, and sculptures but especially collage. He was close to the surrealist and dada movements, and was later associated with CoBrA. As an author, he has been described as a leading promoter of the avant-garde. He worked with Umberto Eco among other collaborators. He had a long interest in the pseudo-philosophy 'pataphysics.

== Biography ==
He was born in Milan into a wealthy family, but left Italy in 1944 having upset the authorities and to avoid conscription. He studied at the Milan University law faculty and the Brera Academy of Art.

In 1951 he founded the arte nucleare movement with Sergio Dangelo, which unlike abstract art was overtly political. Baj himself was aligned with the anarchist movement. His most well-known pieces are probably the series of "Generals": absurd characters made from found objects such as belts or medals.

He made numerous works using motifs from other artists, from Leonardo da Vinci to Picasso. Sometimes he recreated entire works of other painters.

In 1972 the public display of a major work by Bai, The Funeral of the Anarchist Pinelli (a reference to Carlo Carrà's painting The Funeral of the Anarchist Galli of 1911), was banned after the murder of the police officer believed to be responsible for Giuseppe Pinelli's death in custody. However, his work continued to be political. In 1989 he designed thirty marionettes for Le Bleu-blanc-rouge et le noir, an opera by Italian composer Lorenzo Ferrero to a libretto by Anthony Burgess, written for the bicentenary of the French Revolution. In his last years, he created a series of paintings in protest at the election of Silvio Berlusconi. He died in 2003 in Vergiate, Italy.
