= Synthetic training environment =

Military training architecture that integrates live, virtual, and constructive (LVC) simulation

U.S. Army soldiers training in a virtual environment in 2013. Integrating legacy, standalone simulation systems into a unified environment is a central goal of the synthetic training environment.

A synthetic training environment (STE) is a military training architecture that integrates live, virtual, and constructive (LVC) simulation using virtual reality, augmented reality, mixed reality, cloud computing, and artificial intelligence within a shared operational environment. It is designed to allow forces from individual squads and crews up to brigade, division, and multi-domain echelons to rehearse collective operations and mission scenarios repeatedly without the geographic, environmental, or scheduling constraints of traditional field exercises.

The concept originated in modernization efforts by the United States Army to replace legacy training simulators and systems developed in the 1980s and 1990s that operated in isolated silos with incompatible terrain databases and software architectures. As multi-domain operations and manned-unmanned teaming became central to modern military doctrine, allied and partner armed forces—including the British Army, NATO members, and the Republic of Korea Armed Forces—initiated parallel programs to converge live maneuver training with distributed virtual and constructive simulation.

== Background ==
Traditional field training exercises remain indispensable for building tactical proficiency and unit cohesion, but modern defense planners face mounting physical, financial, and regulatory constraints. Urban encroachment around military installations, environmental protection laws, range safety restrictions, and community noise complaints have reduced the availability of large-scale live-fire and maneuver ranges. Rising costs for precision munitions, aviation fuel, and heavy vehicle maintenance further limit how frequently formations can conduct full-scale live exercises.

Concurrently, the character of warfare has expanded across land, maritime, air, space, and cyberspace domains, complicated by the proliferation of unmanned systems, loitering munitions, and artificial intelligence-enabled decision aids. Legacy training simulators—originally fielded as standalone, platform-specific trainers for tanks, helicopters, or infantry squads—relied on static, pre-built terrain boxes that took months to construct and could not easily share data across branches. Defense researchers and modeling specialists noted that overcoming these silos required a common, service-wide synthetic architecture capable of rapidly rendering any point on Earth for pre-deployment mission rehearsal.

== Architecture and components ==
U.S. Army soldiers conducting convoy training in a reconfigurable virtual trainer in 2015. Modular virtual trainers are integrated into broader synthetic architectures.

In the U.S. Army's synthetic training environment framework, core capabilities are organized around shared geospatial data, a common simulation software baseline, automated training management tools, and modular or instrumented training hardware.

Key components of the U.S. Army Synthetic Training Environment
Component	Acronym	Primary function and technical role
One World Terrain	OWT	Generates and streams automated 3D global terrain datasets—including urban interiors, vegetation, and destructible structures—from satellite, aerial, and drone imagery.
Training Simulation Software	TSS	Serves as the common simulation engine enabling distributed trainers, mission command systems, and virtual nodes to interact within a single synthetic battlespace.
Training Management Tool	TMT	Assists instructors and unit leaders in scenario authoring, exercise control, automated data capture, and after-action reviews (AAR).
Reconfigurable Virtual Collective Trainer	RVCT	Provides transportable, modular virtual crew and collective training simulators that can be reconfigured across ground combat vehicles and rotary-wing aircraft.
STE Live Training System	STE LTS	Integrates tactical engagement sensors, laser-less instrumentation, and augmented reality effects with real weapons and vehicles during live exercises.

A foundational innovation of this architecture is One World Terrain (OWT). Whereas legacy simulation workflows required roughly nine months of manual engineering to build a single high-resolution virtual training area, automated photogrammetry and sensor data pipelines reduced terrain generation timelines to approximately eight hours. Similarly, the Reconfigurable Virtual Collective Trainer (RVCT) replaces bulky, single-purpose fixed simulators with containerized or mobile frames whose controls and displays can be swapped to represent different ground vehicles or helicopters, lowering facility and lifecycle costs.

== Live, virtual, and constructive integration ==
A defining characteristic of
