= Transformation of the United States Army =

2021–present reorganization of forces

The transformation of the United States Army aims to integrate cyberspace, space satellite operations, land, maritime, and air operations more closely together ("multi-domain operations." (MDO)). Multi-domain operations is the "employment of capabilities from all domains that create and exploit relative advantages to defeat enemy forces, achieve objectives and consolidate gains during competition, crisis, and armed conflict."

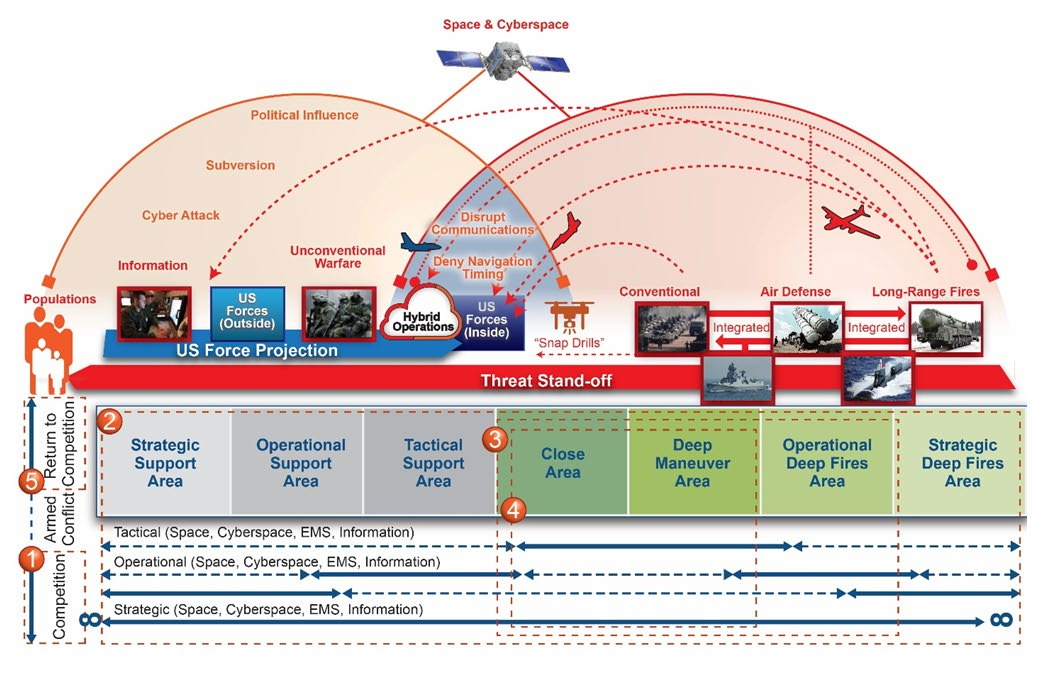
Multi-domain operations (MDO) span multiple domains: outer space, land, air, maritime, cyber, and populations.

United States Army Futures Command had considerable initial involvement. (Note: In Force modernization, Deputy Chiefs of Staff G-8 and G-3/5/7 sit on the Army Requirements Oversight Council (AROC), to advise the Chief of Staff of the Army (CSA). The commander, AFC is responsible for Force design.: The Army's Force management model begins with a projection of the Future operating environment, in terms of resources: political, military, economic, social, information, infrastructure, physical environment, and the time available to bring the Current army to bear on the situation.; The AROC serves as a discussion forum of these factors.; The relevant strategy is provided by the Army's leadership.; A DOTMLPF analysis models the factors necessary to change the Current force into a relevant Future force.; A JCIDS process identifies the gaps in capability between Current and Future force.; A Force design to meet the materiel gaps is underway.; An organization with the desired capabilities (manpower, materiel, training) is brought to bear on each gap.; AR 5-22(pdf) lists the Force modernization proponent for each Army branch, which can be a CoE or Branch proponent leader.; Staff uses a Synchronization meeting before seeking approval —HTAR Force Management 3-2b: "Managing change in any large, complex organization requires the synchronization of many interrelated processes".; A budget request is submitted to Congress.; The resources are "dictated by Congress".; Approved requests then await resource deliveries which then become available to the combatant commanders.)

In 2019, planning re-emphazised large scale ground combat ("LSCO") using divisions, corps, or even larger forces, rather than the counter-insurgency which had taken much time since 2003.

In 2020, the Army's 40th Chief of Staff, Gen. James C. McConville, was calling for transformational change, rather than incremental change by the Army. In 2021, McConville laid out Aimpoint 2035, a direction for the Army to achieve Corps-level "large-scale combat operations" (LSCO) by 2035, with Waypoints from 2021 to 2028. In fall 2018, Army Strategy for the next ten years was articulated listing four Lines of Effort to be implemented. By August 2023, the Army's 41st Chief of Staff Gen. Randy A. George could lay out his priorities. The priorities are:

1. Warfighting capability;
2. Ready combat formations;
3. Continuous transformation;
4. Strengthening the profession of arms.

In 2009 an "ongoing campaign of learning" was the capstone concept for force commanders, meant to carry the Army from 2016 to 2028.

== New capabilities ==
This planned Joint capability was demonstrated to the Combatant commanders (who are the "customers" for the capability) and the Joint Chiefs (who advise the government on the importance of this effort) at White Sands Missile Range in September 2020, in an ongoing campaign for achieving integrated deterrence. By 2020 Project Convergence, a campaign of learning, was pressed into service at Yuma Proving Ground, in the Army's campaign to modernize, by experimental prototype and demonstration of a networking concept; Project Convergence 2021 (PC21) was then a vehicle for the entire DoD, in its Joint Warfighting Concept (JWC) demonstration of Joint All-Domain Command and Control (JADC2). Project Convergence 2022 (PC22) now has a website for candidate entries, even as PC21 was underway in 2021. Analysis is underway in FY2022 to balance modernization and readiness going forward.

== Command headquarters ==
Divisions will operate as plug-and-play headquarters commands (similar to corps) instead of fixed formations with permanently assigned units. Any combination of brigades may be allocated to a division command for a particular mission, up to a maximum of four combat brigades. For instance, the 3rd Infantry Division headquarters could be assigned two armoured brigades and two infantry brigades based on the expected requirements of a given mission. On its next deployment, the same division may have one Stryker brigade and two armor brigades assigned to it. The same modus operandi holds true for support units. The goal of reorganization with regard to logistics is to streamline the logistics command structure so that combat service support can fulfill its support mission more efficiently.

The division headquarters itself has also been redesigned as a modular unit that can be assigned an array of units and serve in many different operational environments. The new term for this headquarters is the UEx (or Unit of Employment, X). The headquarters is designed to be able to operate as part of a joint force, command joint forces with augmentation, and command at the operational level of warfare (not just the tactical level). It will include organic security personnel and signal capability plus liaison elements. As of March 2015, nine of the ten regular Army division headquarters, and two national guard division headquarters are committed in support of combatant commands.

When not deployed, the division will have responsibility for the training and readiness of a certain number of modular brigades units. For instance, the 3rd Infantry Division headquarters module based at Fort Stewart, GA is responsible for the readiness of its combat brigades and other units of the division (that is, 3rd ID is responsible for administrative control —ADCON of its downtrace units), assuming they have not been deployed separately under a different division.

The re-designed headquarters comprises around 1,000 soldiers including over 200 officers. It includes:

- A Main Command Post where mission planning and analysis are conducted
- A mobile command group for commanding while on the move
- (2) Tactical Command Posts to exercise control of brigades
- Liaison elements
- A special troops battalion with a security company and signal company

Divisions will continue to be commanded by major generals, unless coalition requirements require otherwise. Regional army commands (e.g. 3rd Army, 7th Army, 8th Army) will remain in use in the future but with changes to the organization of their headquarters designed to make the commands more integrated and relevant in the structure of the reorganized Army, as the chain of command for a deployed division headquarters now runs directly to an Army service component command (ASCC), or to FORSCOM.

In January 2017, examples of pared-down tactical operations centers, suitable for brigades and divisions, were demonstrated at a command post huddle at Fort Bliss. The huddle of the commanders of FORSCOM, United States Army Reserve Command, First Army, I and III Corps, 9 of the Active Army divisions, and other formations discussed standardized solutions for streamlining command posts. The Army is paring-down the tactical operations centers, and making them more agile, to increase their survivability. By July 2019 battalion command posts have demonstrated jump times of just over 3 hours, at the combat training centers, repeated 90 to 120 times in a rotation. The C5ISR center of CCDC ran a series of experiments (Network Modernization Experiment 2020 — NetModX 20) whether using LTE for connecting nodes in a distributed Command post environment was feasible, from July to October 2020.

== Four Army commands ==
In the summer of 2018, the U.S. Army Futures Command (AFC),

- Army Directive 2017–33: Enabling the Army Modernization Task Force</ref> a new Army command for modernization was activated. The modernization effort, coordinated with FORSCOM, US Army Materiel Command (AMC), and US Army Training and Doctrine Command (TRADOC), addresses the long lead times for introducing new materiel and capabilities into the brigades of the Army.

United States Army Futures Command (AFC) grew, from 12 people at headquarters in 2018 to 24,000 in 25 states and 15 countries in 2019. More rapid modernization for conflict with near-peers is the reason for AFC. AFC was to be focused on achieving clear overmatch in six areas — long-range precision fires, next-generation combat vehicle, future vertical lift platforms, a mobile & expeditionary Army network, air & missile defense capabilities, and soldier lethality (i.e. artillery, armor, aviation, signal, air defense artillery, and infantry).

In a break with Army custom, AFC headquarters was placed in a downtown property of the University of Texas System, and project-driven soldiers and Army civilians with entrepreneurs/innovators in tech hubs. AFC was activated on 24 August 2018, in Austin, Texas; AFC soldiers were to blend into Austin by not wearing their uniforms to work side by side with civilians in the tech hubs.

The Program Executive Offices (PEOs) of the United States Assistant Secretary of the Army for Acquisition, Logistics, and Technology (ASA (ALT) were to have a dotted-line relationship with Futures Command.

Eight cross-functional teams (CFTs) were transferred from the other three major commands to Futures Command. United States Army Research, Development and Engineering Command and the United States Army Capabilities Integration Center will report to the new command. ATEC retains its direct reporting relationship to the Chief of Staff of the Army.

The first tranche of transfers into AFC included: Capabilities Integration Center (ARCIC), Capability Development and Integration Directorates (CDIDs), and TRADOC Analysis Center (TRAC) from TRADOC, and RDECOM (including the six research, development and engineering centers (RDECs), and the U.S. Army Research Laboratory (ARL), and Army Materiel Systems Analysis Activity (AMSAA), from AMC, as announced by Secretary Esper on 4 June 2018. TRADOC's new role is amended accordingly. The Principal Military Deputy to the ASA(ALT) was also to become deputy commanding general for Combat Systems, Army Futures Command, while leading the PEOs; he has directed each PEO who does not have a CFT to coordinate with, to immediately form one, at least informally. General Murray has announced that AFC intends to be a global command, in its search for disruptive technologies. 39th Army Chief of Staff Milley was looking for AFC to attain full operational capability (FOC) by August 2019, a goal since met.

As this modernized materiel is fielded to the brigades, the scheme is to equip the units with the highest levels of readiness for deployment with upgraded equipment earliest, while continuing to train the remaining units to attain their full mission capability.

== Multi-domain operations (MDO) ==
Conflict continuum: competition short of conflict, conflict itself, and the return to competition, possibly via deterrence —Gen. David G. Perkins

In 2017, TRADOC formulated the concept of multi-domain battle (MDB). The Army sought joint approval for MDB from the other services; instead, the Air Force recommended multi-domain operations (MDO). Multi-domain operations cover integrated operation of cyberspace, space (meaning satellite operations, from the Army's perspective), land, maritime, and air.

The 1st Multi-Domain Task Force was stood up in 2018 in I Corps for the Pacific, built around 17th Field Artillery Brigade. MDO in the Pacific has to involve maritime operations. Multi-domain battalions, first stood up in 2019, comprise a single unit for air, land, space, and cyber domains to ensure integration of cyber/EW, space, and information operations in more levels of command.

To me, ARCIC's [MDO] analysis means the Army's got to be able to sink ships, neutralize satellites, shoot down missiles, and deny the enemy the ability to command and control its forces.

— Adm. Harry B. Harris Jr.

Expansion of Army MDO activities to Europe was planned for 2020.

By 2020 the Army's programs for modernization were now framed as a decades-long process of cooperation with allies and partners, for competition with potential adversaries who historically have blurred the distinction between peace and war, and who have been operating within the continuum (the gray zone) between peace, cooperation, competition, crisis, and conflict instead. When meeting a crisis, the Army's preference is deterrence. (Note: (22 Mar 2022) See, for example the ongoing thread of Prof. Paul Poast) The need for deterrence against ballistic missiles is shifting to the need to deter or defend against attack by hypersonic weapons.

=== Multi-domain task forces (MDTFs) ===
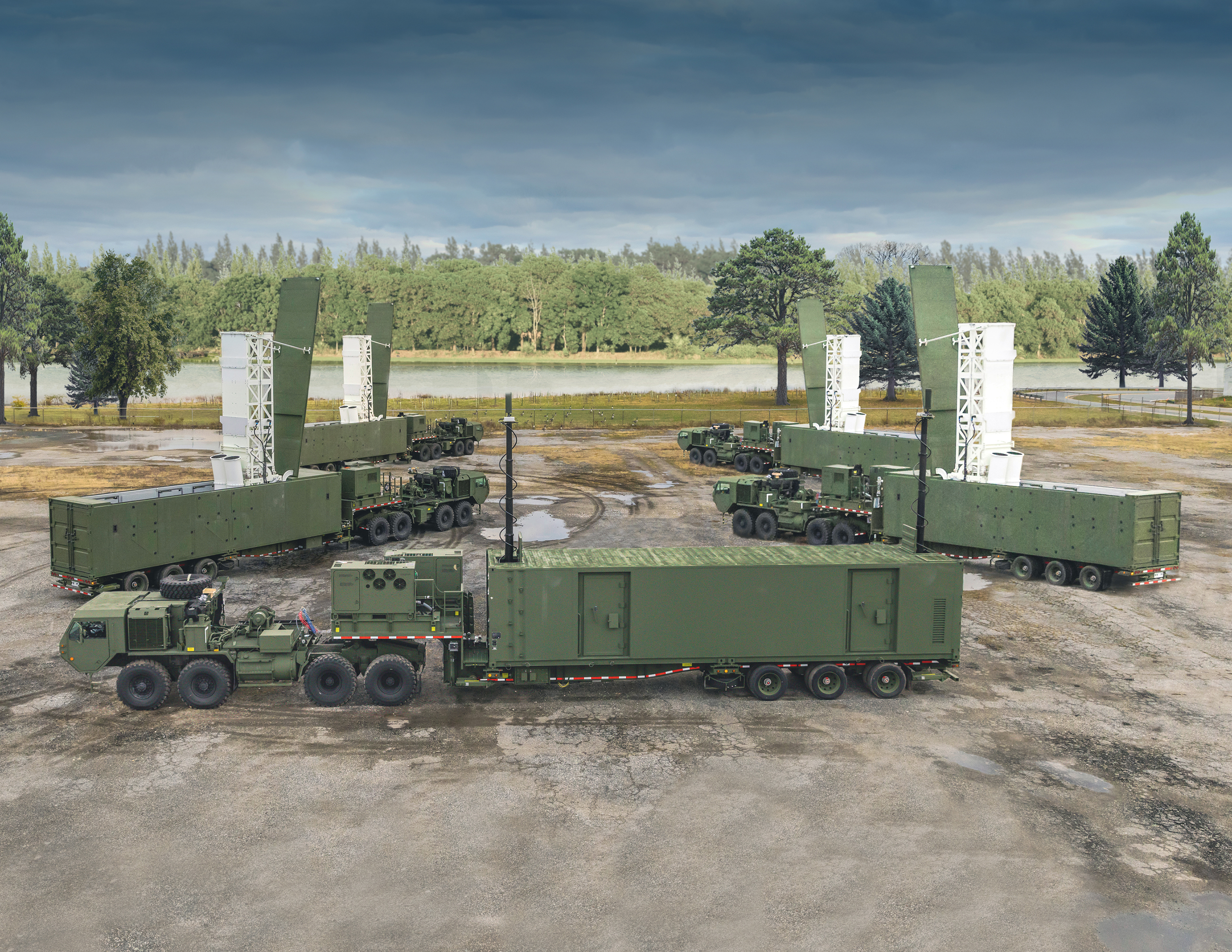
Typhon missile system

MDTF is a brigade-sized theater-level unit designed to synchronize precision effects and precision fires in all domains against adversary anti-access/area denial (A2/AD) networks in all domains. A MDTF includes two batteries of long-range missiles. One battery, called Mid-Range Capability (MRC), which can fire further than 1,100 miles, has Typhon missile system. The other battery should have the new Long-Range Hypersonic Weapon, whose classified range is likely several thousand miles. A MDTF also includes a HIMARS battery plus air defense battalion, Intelligence, Information, Cyber, Electronic Warfare and Space battalion and support battalion

The Army established 1st Multidomain Task Force at Joint Base Lewis-McChord, Washington, in 2017. U.S. Indo-Pacific Command theater exercises with this MDTF participation helped inform the Army's Multi-Domain Operations warfighting concept, which has now evolved into doctrine. 2nd Multi-Domain Task Force was established in Mainz-Kastel, Germany in 2021 and 3rd Multi-Domain Task Force was established at Fort Shafter, Hawaii in 2022.

The first MDTF was an experimental brigade-sized unit which was tailored to its theater; MDTFs are to operate subordinate to a Theater fires command, or to a corps, or division headquarters, jointly or independently, depending on the mission. These MDTFs increase the "capability to connect with national assets" in space and cyber, with "the capacity to penetrate with long range fires, with the ability to integrate all domains". —This is integrated deterrence: taking existing capabilities, as well as building on new capabilities, which have been deployed in new and networked ways, (Note: See Sydney J. Freedberg Jr. (November 22, 2019) SecArmy's Multi-Domain Kill Chain: Space-Cloud-AI Army Multi-Domain Operations Concept, December 2018 slide from TRADOC pamphlet 525-3-1 (Dec 2018).: In September 2020 an ABMS Onramp demonstrated a § specific scenario, which can be illustrated by the 5 red numbered bullet points from the slide in TRADOC pamphlet 525-3-1: 1. Competition— No overt hostilities are yet detected. Blue bar (force projection) is in standoff against red bar (threat).; 2. Strategic Support area— National assets (blue) detect breaching of standoff by adversary (in red).; 3. Close area support— blue assets hand-off to the combatant commands, who are to create effects visible to the adversary (in red).; 4. Deep maneuver— blue combatant actions dis-integrate adversary efforts (per TRADOC pamphlet 525-3-1: "militarily compete, penetrate, dis-integrate, and exploit" the adversary); —Operational and Strategic deep fires create effects on the adversary. Adversary is further subject to defeat in detail, until adversaries perceive they are overmatched (no more red assets to expend).; 5. Adversary retreats to standoff. The populations perceive that the adversary is defeated, for now. (Compare to Perkins' cycle, 'return to competition', in which deterrence has succeeded in avoiding a total war, in favor of pushing an adversary back to standoff (the red threat bar). Blue force projection still has overmatched red threat.) all tailored to the security landscape of the respective regions, in order to deter the antagonists.

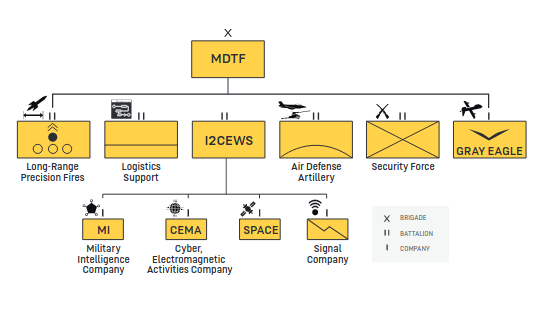
Multi-domain task force (MDTF), a brigade-sized formation. Five MDTFs are planned: (Note: When used in multi-domain operations, I2CEWS denotes Intelligence, Information, Cyber, Electronic Warfare, and Space. See: ISR, or Intelligence, surveillance and reconnaissance, and National Geospatial-Intelligence Agency) 3 for INDOPACOM, 1 for EUCOM, 1 formerly for the Arctic (but now the 3rd MDTF in INDOPACOM), and 1 for global response, each tailored for the needs of the Joint force commander. (Note: The Army (21 Jun 2022) has released a "programmatic environmental assessment (PEA) and draft finding of no significant impact (FONSI) regarding the stationing of a multi-domain task force (MDTF)". Two configurations were considered: 1) a full MDTF of 3,000 troops, and 2) a base MDTF of 400 with headquarters.) An MDTF can simultaneously operate across multiple stages of the conflict continuum, and engage antagonists at thousands of miles, for sustained periods.

By 2028, the fifth MDTF is expected to be in full operation.

=== Deterrence ===
In the decade from 2009 to 2019 the Army was transitioning its brigade-based counterinsurgency effort to modernization of the echelons above brigade; by 2021 integrated deterrence was underway (a campaign operating across domains, by a single commander to meet the objective of the Joint and Allied Force —the concept is scalable, assigning one objective per task force commander) against possible adversaries, as part of the Joint force's campaign of learning.

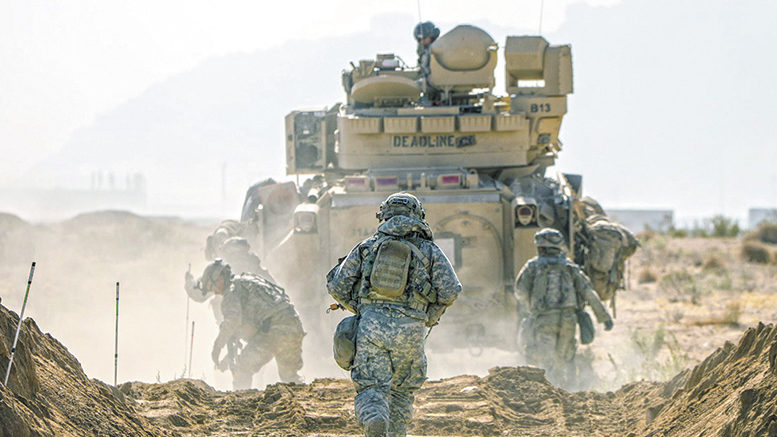
JWA 19, Yakima Training Center, Wash., May 6, 2019. Soldiers of 1st Battalion, 17th Infantry Regiment, 2nd Stryker Brigade Combat Team, 2nd Infantry Division heading toward their mission objective.

TRADOC designed exercises for Joint warfighter assessments —JWA 19, at Fort Lewis, to clarify the jumps for Command Posts, to ensure their survivability during future operations. In 2019, there was a new focus on planning for large-scale ground combat operations (LSCO), "that will require echelons above brigade, all of which will solve unique and distinct problems that a given BCT can't solve by itself."— LTG Eric Wesley. Computer simulations of unit survivability rates, were then compared with the interaction strategies, tactics and operations of JWA 19, a highly contested environment. JWA 19 occurred at multiple operational speeds, in multiple domains served by multiple services (cyber: operating in milliseconds; air: operations at 500 miles per hour; maritime: 30 knots; and ground: 2 miles per hour). JWA 19 involved the militaries of the US, the United Kingdom, New Zealand, Canada, France, Australia and Singapore. (Note: Michael Lundy (Sep 2018) The U.S. Army Concept for Multi-Domain Combined Arms Operations at Echelons Above Brigade 2025–2040 Echelons Above Brigade (EAB), as cited by Scott McKean) (Note: In 2018 new cyber authorities were granted under National Security Presidential Memorandum (NSPM) 13; persistent cyber engagements at Cyber command are the new norm for cyber operations.) (Note: Army Futures Command (AFC) has initiated planning for Multi-domain operations (MDO) which will extend beyond the Active component (the Regular Army) to include the Reserve component: Army Reserve or National Guard (ARNG) units. AFC's Futures and Concepts DCG, Lt. General Eric J. Wesley, is clear that troops from both Active and Reserve components will be interoperating, and that no troops will be lost from the Reserve (ARNG) component, but that there would be flow between Active and Reserve components. The subject is still fluid, including the relation between the services; the Army, Marines, and Air Force, at least are 'on the same page'.)

Mesh networking is in play for the Mobile, Expeditionary Network: In Fiscal Year 2019, the network CFT, PEO 3CT, and PEO Soldier used Network Integration Evaluation 18.2 for experiments with brigade level scalability. Among the takeaways was to avoid overspecifying the requirements (in ITN Information Systems Initial Capabilities Document) to meet operational needs, such as interoperability with other networks. ITN —Integrated Tactical Network is being fielded to four brigades in 2021. Up through 2028, every two years the Army will insert new capability sets for ITN (Capability sets '21, '23, '25, etc.).

On 25 September 2020 Army Chief of Staff Gen. James C. McConville discussed the combination of Multi-domain operations (MDO) and Joint All-Domain Command and Control (JADC2) with Air Force Chief of Staff Gen. Charles Q. Brown.

On 2 October 2020 the 40th Chief of Staff of the Army and the 22nd Chief of Staff of the Air Force signed a Memorandum of understanding (MOU) on Combined Joint All-Domain Command and Control (CJADC2) of the two services, a two-year agreement. Their staffs met again after 60 days to show their progress on connecting the Army's Project Convergence and the Air Force's ABMS into a data fabric in 2021.

In February 2024 the Air Force's Brig. Gen. Luke Cropsey warned that phase two of Combined JADC2, which was supposed to go forward in 2024 is not starting because Continuing Resolutions (CRs) do not fund new program spending —full Congressional budget approval for FY2024 is required for Combined JADC2 to go forward in 2024.

=== Conflict ===
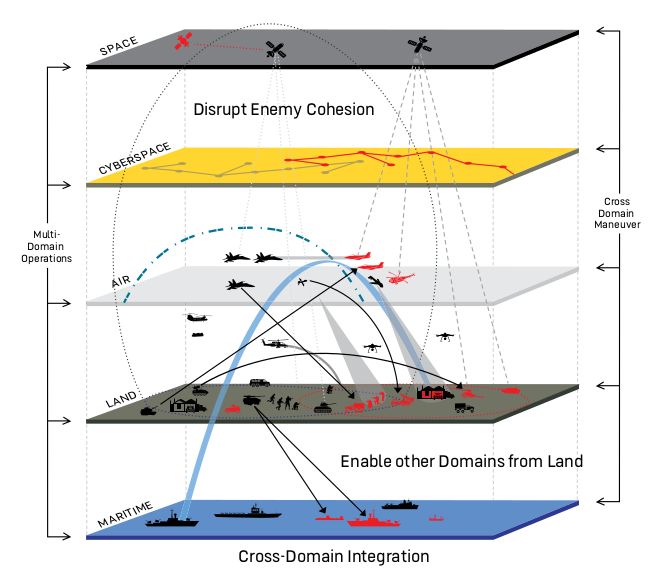
In a conflict, friendly forces (denoted in black) work as an integrated force against adversaries (denoted in red). The force operates in Multi-domains (gray, yellow, light gray, dark gray, and dark blue) —Space, Cyber, Air, Land, and Maritime respectively— severally and simultaneously cooperating across domains. (Note: On 5 June 2023 Army Capabilities Development Command Ground Vehicle Systems Center awarded contracts to close down the autonomous vehicle leader-follower program in favor of a competitive commercial autonomy package.) These operations will disrupt the adversaries, and present them multiple simultaneous dilemmas. The operations are designed to encourage adversaries to learn the advantages of a return to competition, rather than continuing a conflict.

If you want to rapidly integrate all domains in order to take advantage of opportunities on a very lethal battlefield, you need a different type of C2 [command and control] structure. —Lt. Gen. Eric J. Wesley

=== Competition ===
In September and November 2019 the Department of Defense (DoD) "scheduled a series of globally integrated exercises with participation from across the US government interagency to refine.. plans." This exercise was designed to help 27th Secretary of Defense Mark Esper develop new plans, in the face of a change in chairmanship of the Joint Chiefs of Staff.

What was missing in 2019 was a joint concept shared at the appropriate operational speed between the several domains, among the respective services, when fighting a peer adversary. Note the referenced LRHW graphic depicting a 2019 scenario—

Greater threats from large-scale peer adversaries necessitate a return to Divisions, Corps, and Field Armies, rather than operations at the brigade level. The aim is to force adversaries to return to competition, rather than continue conflict; kill chains were formed within seconds, by live-fire demonstration, as of September 2020.

In the Army of 2030 a division would be the Unit of Action, rather than a brigade. Artillery, engineer, and intelligence units would mass at the division echelon; brigades would become smaller to become more maneuverable. A corps would sustain the brigades' endurance for the longer fight; the higher echelons (field army, corps, and division) would gain the resources they would need for the duration of an operation.

By 2021 the Department of Defense could train using capabilities it had developed jointly among its military departments, using concepts it had settled upon experimentally, beginning in 2019:

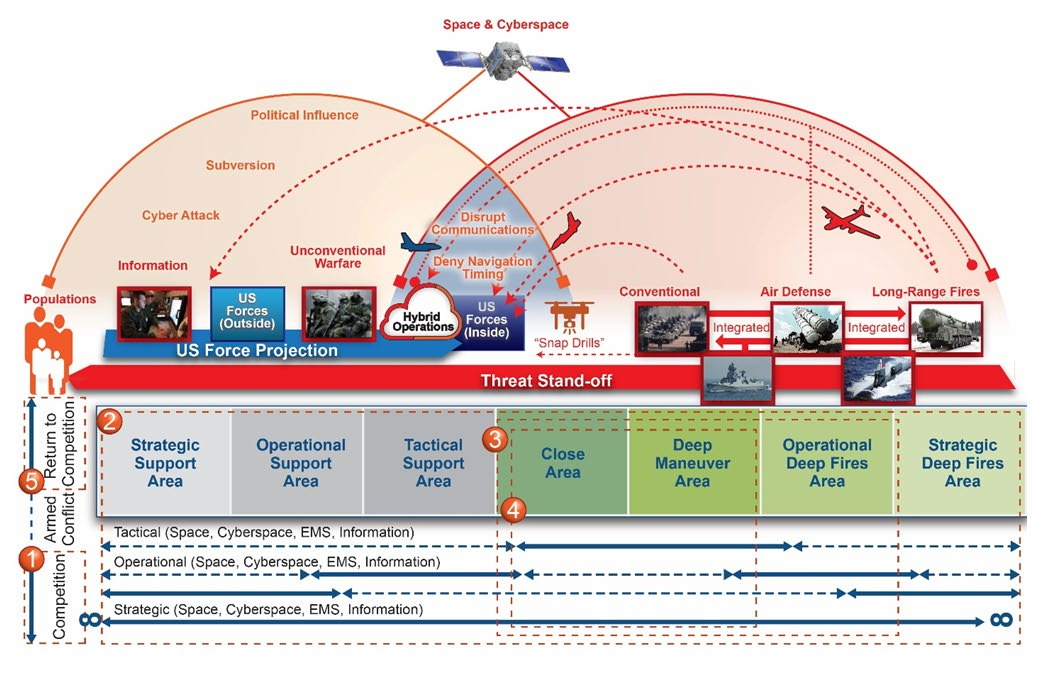
Multi-domain operations (MDO) span multiple domains: outer space, land, air, maritime, cyber, and populations. Echelons above brigade (division, corps, and theater army) engage in a continuum of conflict. (Note: Colin Clark (18 Feb 2020) Gen. Hyten On The New American Way of War: All-Domain Operations (ADO): "A computer-coordinated fight": in the air, land, sea, space, cyber, and the electromagnetic spectrum (EMS); "forces from satellites to foot soldiers to submarines sharing battle data at machine-to-machine speed"; "it's the ability to integrate and effectively command and control all domains in a conflict or in a crisis seamlessly"—Gen. Hyten, Vice Chairman of the Joint Chiefs; All-Domain Operations (ADO) use global capabilities: "space, cyber, deterrent [the nuclear triad (for mutually assured destruction in the Cold War, an evolving concept in itself)], transportation, electromagnetic spectrum operations, missile defense") —This illustration is from The MDO Concept, TRADOC pamphlet 525-3-1.

Note: the following training scenario, to gain relative advantage, is only one of the possible paths suggested by following the 5 red numbered bullet points in the illustration.

1. Competition— No overt hostilities are yet detected. Blue bar (force projection) is in standoff against red bar (threat).
2. Strategic Support area— National assets (blue) detect breaching of standoff by adversary (in red).
3. Close area support— blue assets hand-off to the combatant commands, who are to create effects visible to the adversary (in red).
4. Deep maneuver— blue combatant actions dis-integrate adversary efforts (per TRADOC pamphlet 525-3-1: "militarily compete, penetrate, dis-integrate, and exploit" the adversary); —Operational and Strategic deep fires create effects on the adversary. Adversary is further subject to defeat in detail, until adversaries perceive they are overmatched (no more red assets to expend).
5. Adversary retreats to standoff. The populations perceive that the adversary is defeated, for now. (Compare to Perkins' cycle, 'return to competition', in which deterrence has succeeded in avoiding a total war, in favor of pushing an adversary back to standoff (the red threat bar). Blue force projection still has overmatched red threat.)

In 2019 the 27th Secretary of Defense ordered the four services and the Joint staff to create a new joint warfighting concept for All-domain operations (ADO), operating simultaneously in the air, land, sea, space, cyber, and the electromagnetic spectrum (EMS). In 2021 the 28th Secretary of Defense approved the Joint warfighting concept (JWC), which remains classified.

The 20th Chairman of the Joint Chiefs of Staff has allocated roles to each of the services in concept development for Joint All-Domain Operations (JADO);

- the Air Force takes the lead for command and control (C2). The Joint services each have a C2 concept to be scaled —for the Army, C2 requires thousands of connections with the sensors and shooters, (Note: Blue force tracking—The Army now has technology to keep track of its warfighters, down to the squad level position, or even individual soldier position.) as compared with hundreds of connections with the sensors and shooters for the Air Force Advanced Battle Management System (ABMS);
- the Navy will lead concept development in Joint fires: its newest equipment (the newer Littoral Combat Ships, the MQ-8C, and the Naval Strike Missile) provides standoff for the Navy against its near-peers. In February 2020, voices at the tactical level were supporting cross-domain, cross-role, cross-service interoperation: "Any sensor should be able to link to any shooter and any command and control node". The combination of F-35-based targeting coordinates, Long range precision fires, and Low-earth-orbit satellite capability overmatches the competition, according to Lt. Gen. Eric Wesley. A Space sensor layer of satellites (at 1200 miles above earth) would position hundreds of Low-earth-orbit sensors for tracking hypersonic vehicles. This tracking layer would provide guidance information to the interceptors in the missile defense system.
- the Army will lead concept development for contested logistics.
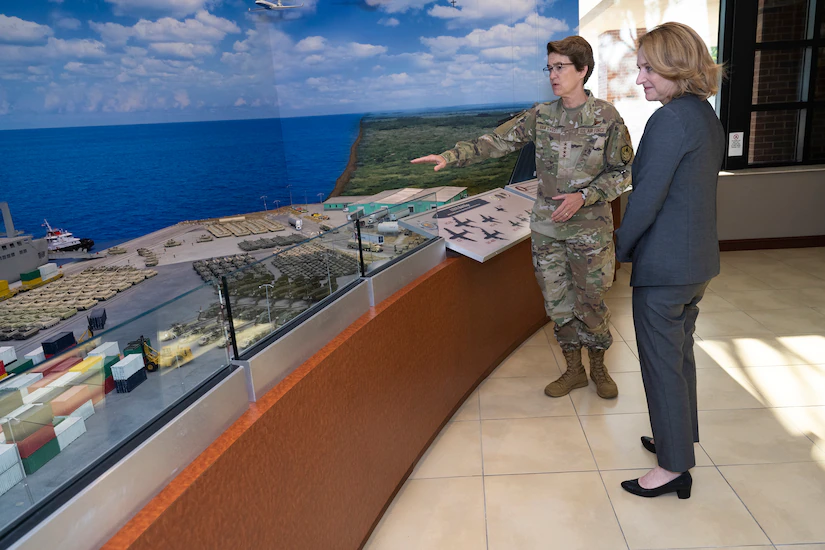
  Gen. Van Ovost, commander of United States Transportation Command briefs Kathleen Hicks, 35th United States Deputy Secretary of Defense about the mission of her combatant command
  (Note: In 2023 a new cross-functional team (CFT) was stood up for Contested Logistics.)
- the service to lead concept development in 'Information advantage' is not yet determined by the Joint Staff J-7 as of 16 September 2020. Build a kill chain faster than the adversary's OODA loop. (Note: See Fog of war) AI is one such initiative.
- By 11 August 2021, the Joint requirements oversight council (JROC) identified a 5th functional capability— Integrated air and missile defense (IAMD). JROC will now issue a directive to evaluate the capability gaps in the Missile defense review of C2BMC as well as the Nuclear Posture Review.

In late December 2019, the Air Force, Army, and Navy ran a Joint all-domain command and control (JADC2) connection exercise of Advanced Battle Management System (ABMS) for the first time. This exercise is denoted ABMS Onramp, and will occur at four month intervals. JADC2 is a joint multi-domain operation (MDO); the exercise will involve the Army's Long range fires, ground-based troops, and Sentinel radar. The Air Force contributes F-22s and F-35s, while the Navy is bringing F-35Cs and a destroyer to ABMS Onramp. The December 2019 exercise used a NORTHCOM scenario.

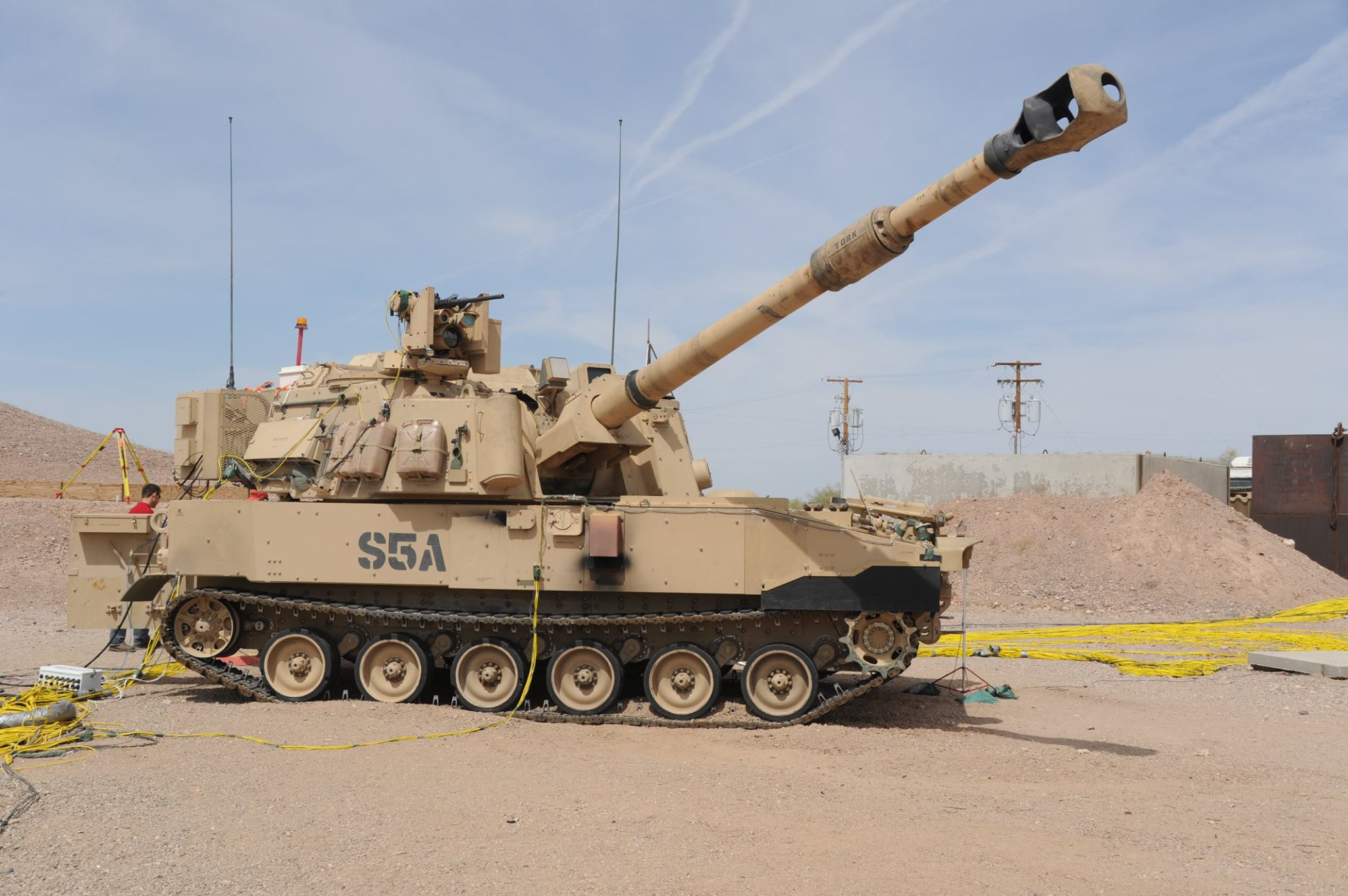
An M109A7 self-propelled howitzer at Yuma Proving Ground

The April 2020 test of ABMS was delayed by the COVID-19 pandemic. The test was to have spanned bases from Eglin AFB to Nellis AFB; from Yuma Proving Ground to White Sands Missile Range— in this test, a simulated attack was to take place on 3 geographic commands: on Space Command, on Northern Command, and on Strategic Command's nuclear command, control, and communications.

JADC2 is to ensure continuity of commander's intent. The concept was exercised September 2020. Integrated Air and Missile Defense Battle Command System (IBCS) engaged in a Limited user test in August–September 2020 as preparation for the Milestone C acquisition decision. IBCS is a critical building block for JADC2; the ABMS test is a separate project. Thirty-three different hardware platforms, some using 5G, 70 industry teams, and 65 government teams (Note: Theresa Hitchens (25 August 2020) More Ambitious ABMS Demo Uses 5G: Roper: AFWERX (25 August 2020) Dr. Will Roper ABMS 'Ask Me Anything' 1:30:33 ABMS (Advanced battle management system) requires Internet of Military Things.; 5:00 Foundational IoT: Containerized software systems, forming the connective tissue between domains, devices, platforms, populations.; 16:15 There is not going to be one machine-to-machine system in the future force, but rather a set of machine-to-machine data-exchanges (in publishable, understandable, communicable, discoverable formats).; 22:50 A new kind of requirements process (horizontal (modernize seamlessly over time) rather than vertical, top-down processes for hardware). If a standard exists, such as 5G, or APIs, use it.; 27:50 A culture change, elevating data in importance, over bullets, will be required to win wars. Simplification of the ABMS user interface will be necessary, in order to present the relevant mission-dependent data to the Soldier, or Combatant commander.; 31:30 There will be so much happening, that phone calls will be seen as the obstacle they are, during ABMS Onramp, just like the COVID-19 data needs.; 35:00 deviceONE operates on SIPRNET tablets today. Portions of ABMS are operational today (25 August 2020).; 39:50 a devOps mentality will be required; X as a Service (XaaS) is needed for Developer's adaptability and agility in the face of uncertain threats --an OODA loop with 4-month cycles. Agility and adaptability are needed for the Onramps. A set of Use cases are the targets to be sought during the development process.; 49:20 70 industry team offerings are welcome, include 50%-solutions as well.; 52:00 There is no way the Acquisition process can have a lead Systems Integrator to serve as Prime Contractor for a program— Replace this with a tool, a common infrastructure (tech stack) with full authorities (IRAD, Design Reviews, -- DoD has to be good at IT).; 56:10 for the Army, ABMS means National-level situation awareness, that is tuned, relevant to the mission— from the Soldier on the ground, or to the Combatant Commander.; 1:00:00 Use robotic agents (drones as wingmen or battle-buddies) to absorb threats at the tip of the spear; 1:06:00 pull people back from the tip of the spear, in favor of robots. Have people make the calls/commands to direct the strikes; this will not replace the warfighter.; 1:14:00 ABMS scale-up — If we fail, this won't be tried again for years.) participated in this ABMS Onramp, the first week in September 2020. By 13 May 2021 the 28th Secretary of Defense had approved the JADC2 strategy. On 11 August 2021 JROC had identified a 5th functional capability (Integrated air and missile defense —IAMD) in addition to the 4 functional battle efforts, or competitive advantages already identified.

In August 2020 a Large force test event (LFTE) was completed at Nellis AFB; the test event demonstrated the ability of F-35s to orchestrate SEAD (Suppression of Enemy Air Defense) using F-22s, F-15Es, E/A-18Gs, B-2s, and RQ-170s. In addition the ability of F-35s to direct Multi-Domain Operations (MDO) was demonstrated during the 2020 Orange Flag event at Edwards AFB (Orange Flag showed the ability of an F-35A to collect targeting data, relay that data to an airborne communications node, as well as to a simulated Integrated Air and Missile Defense Battle Command System or IBCS station).

==== Project Convergence (PC20) ====
In fall 2020, Futures Command is testing the data links between the Army's AI task force and its helicopters —Future Vertical Lift (FVL), its long-range missile launchers —Long range precision fires (LRPF), and its combat vehicles —(NGCV); in fall 2021 and going forward, the links between ABMS and Multi-domain operations are invited when the Army's Air and Missile Defense capabilities (AMD's IBCS and MSHORAD —Maneuver short-range air defense) have undergone further testing.

In September 2020, an ABMS Demonstration at WSMR (White Sands Missile Range) shot down cruise missile surrogates with hypervelocity (speeds of Mach 5) projectiles jointly developed by the Army and Navy. The Army interceptor stems from an XM109 Paladin howitzer; the Navy interceptor stems from a deck gun. The data feeds used both 4G and 5G, as well as cloud-based AI feeds, to form the kill chains. The kill chains directing the intercepts were developed from 60 data feeds, and took seconds to develop, as opposed to the minutes which previous processes took. Other 'sensor-to-shooter' kill chains included AIM-9 missiles launched from F-16s and MQ-9s, as well as a ground-launched AIM-9 missile (which was designed to be an air-to-air munition). Four National Test Ranges were involved in the demonstration, as well as five combatant commands. In October 2020 the DoD Acquisition chief completed an extensive redesign of the Adaptive acquisition framework (AAF) including software acquisition, middle-tier acquisition, defense business systems, acquisition of services, urgent capability acquisition and major capability acquisition. AAF now adheres to the updated DoD 5000.01 policy approved in September 2020 by her lead, the Deputy Defense Secretary.

==== PC21 ====
In March 2021, XVIII Airborne Corps hosted a Project Maven (DoD AI-based) live-fire experiment which shares targeting data among F-35s, A-10s, HIMARS, and satellites.

In June 2021 the 28th secretary of defense issued a classified memorandum directing the Services to engage in more joint experimentation and prototyping, in support of the All-domain operations (JADO) concept (the Joint warfighting concept). In fall 2021, a Joint Force (Army, Navy, Air Force, Marine Corps, and Special Operations) used Project Convergence 2021 (PC21) to simulate the distances in the First island chain of the Pacific Ocean, which Army Long-Range Precision Fires (LRPF) are to cover. A Multi-domain task force (MDTF), and Special Forces took the lead during the Competition phase of the exercise. In June 2021 the 35th Deputy secretary of defense announced

1. the RDER (Rapid defense experimentation reserve, "Raider") to fund those defense organizations which successfully institutionalize experiments to exercise joint warfighting capability. (Note: RDER will fund the Combatant Commander's experiments in Joint Warfighting Concepts: °advanced fires, °command and control, °information advantage, and °contested logistics; the Concepts' exercise coordination and execution cell will be funded from RDER.)
  - One example might be, say an end-to-end flow of data, say in a kill chain from an intelligence, surveillance and reconnaissance detection of an enemy hypersonic weapons launch, to interdiction of the threat, to battle damage assessment.
  - Note that exercises to deepen a service silo have a disadvantage in a competition for RDER funding.
2. an AI and data acceleration initiative (Note: $76.79 million is requested for FY23.) to help the 11 combatant commands apply their new capabilities; teams of specialists are to assist the combatant commanders to automate the data flows of what are currently manual exercises in the respective command posts. The most effective processes are to be left in place after the exercises. (Note: Global Information Dominance Experiments are the vehicle for this effort.)
3. § The DoD is seeking AI technology to gain a relative advantage in § competition.
4. DoD is attempting to fund 8 CHIPS hubs.

Integrated Air and Missile Defense Battle Command System (IBCS), an IAMD Battle Command System, is an Army project which unifies its disparate anti-missile systems (such as the THAAD, and MIM-104 Patriot missiles) and their radars/sensors (such as THAAD's AN/TPY-2 radar, AN/MPQ-64 Sentinel, and Patriot AN/MPQ-65 radars). IBCS was exercised in Fall 2021 (Project Convergence 2021) to experiment with its connection to JADC2 and ABMS. JROC is appending IAMD capability (IAMD interoperability) to the JWC (Joint warfighting concept) (Monte Carlo simulations of hundreds of thousands of IBCS missile data tracks were generated by an Army Air Defense Artillery battalion exercising IBCS in 2020; The test created terabytes of data to be queried. i.e., "connect any sensor to any shooter and any command and control node" —Eric Wesley)

In a review of Project Convergence 2021 (PC2021) the director of the Network Cross-functional team (CFT) was able to state 5 takeaways for the Integrated Tactical Network:

1. "the importance of a data fabric"—
2. "a significant improvement in coverage from resilient wide-band satellite communications"—
3. "the importance of an aerial tier to the network to improve the resiliency and range"
4. extending edge mesh networking
5. "the need for a joint operational common picture"– ("provide commanders with a single pane of glass [on a computer screen]")

In August 2023 the Navy's § Live, Virtual, and Constructive environment simulated joint operation across multiple domains. This involved 22 global time zones, and simulated Joint Staff, civilian leaders, and non-navy personnel.

=== Crisis ===
By September 2020 the joint modernization efforts to retain overmatch in a crisis were visible in the press reports covering the joint level (DoD and the military departments).

In the view of John Hyten, 11th Vice Chairman of the Joint Chiefs, in a crisis, each force is to have both a self-defense capability, and a deep strike capability, operating under a unified command and control structure, simultaneously across the domains, against the enemy. The potential capability exposed by the use of AI in September 2020 posed a choice for the combatant commanders, who needed to select their top priority, by answering "What do you want and how do we do it?" in November 2020. Hyten then had an opportunity to shape the operation of the Joint requirements oversight council, by providing a common operational picture to the combatant commanders and their forces in the respective domains, to get to a position of relative advantage very quickly (faster than the enemy's OODA loop).

In FY2021, TITAN (Tactical Intelligence Targeting Access Node) (Note: Tactical Intelligence Targeting Access Node (TITAN) is a ground station for integrating the data feed between "sensors and shooters".) was to undergo an Analysis of Alternatives (AOA). TITAN is part of the network to integrate sensors and shooters in Multi-domain operations (MDO), in seconds. By FY2022 TITAN was meant to be a Program of Record, for CJADC2; additional Soldier touchpoints will assess capabilities of two prototype satellite ground stations for downselect in 14 months by FY2023, and follow-on phases III and IV.

=== Return to competition ===
By 2020 the Joint all-domain concept was converging on the need for the allies and partners to convince the adversary that it is in everyone's interest to return to competition, well short of conflict between near-peer adversaries. In 2021 the 40th Chief of Staff of the Army described the Army's role in the Continuum of military competition, a Joint concept. (Note: Saltzman's theory is 1) avoid operational surprise, 2) deny first-mover advantage, and 3) confront malign activity. —Gen. Chance Saltzman (Jan 2024), "Competitive Endurance: A Proposed Theory of Success for the Space Force". 6 pages. The Army is drafting a theory of victory.)

Great power competition does not mean great power conflict. —40th Army Chief of Staff James C. McConville

=== Army Transformation Initiative ===
In May 2025, the United States Secretary of the Army directed the Army to begin the "Army Transformation Initiative." It "will reexamine all requirements and eliminate unnecessary ones, ruthlessly prioritize fighting formations to directly contribute to lethality, and empower leaders at echelon to make hard calls to ensure resources align with strategic objectives." It is planned that long-range missiles will be aquirred and modernized UAS into formations formed, the M1E3 and MV-75 fielded and the Counter-UAS gap be closed. United States Army Futures Command and United States Army Training and Doctrine Command will merge into a single formation. Likewise, United States Army Forces Command, United States Army North, and United States Army South will merge into a Western Hemisphere Command. The number of general officers will be trimmed.

One Aerial Cavalry Squadron per active Combat Aviation Brigade (CAB) will be reduced, and all IBCTs will restructure as Mobile Brigade Combat Teams equipped with the M1301 infantry squad vehicle to enhance mobility.

== Alliances and partnerships ==
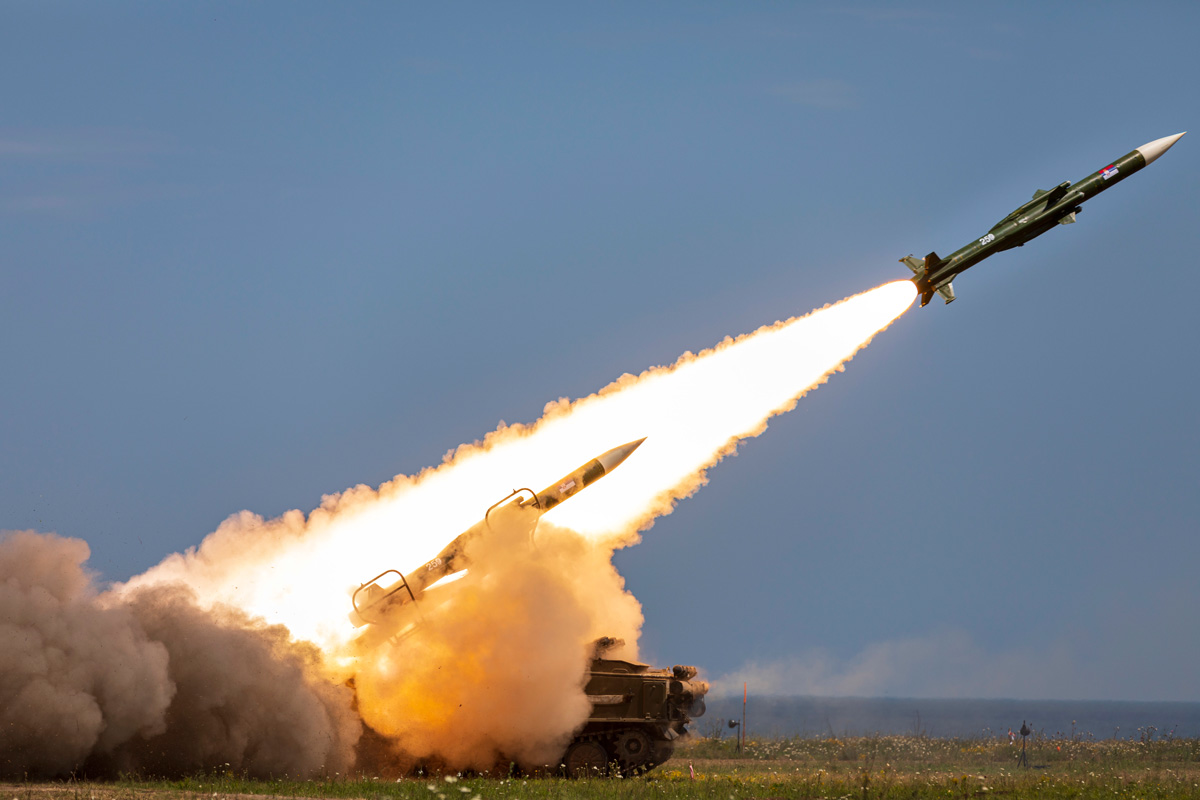
A 2K12 Kub surface-to-air missile system fired during the multinational live-fire training exercise which included 10th Army Air and Missile Defense Command U.S. Army Europe, in Bulgaria June 2019

An ongoing series of programs to strengthen relationships between the Army and its allies and partners is being implemented. These programs include demonstrations of cooperation, interoperability, and preparedness of its partners. For example, in 2019 the Army uses DoD's State Partnership Program, to link 22 National Guard Bilateral Affairs Officers (BAOs) with 22 allies or partners in the 54 countries in European Command's area to facilitate common defense interests with the US. In all, 89 partnerships now exist.

DoD's Joint Artificial Intelligence Center (JAIC) has convened 100 online participants from 13 countries to discuss how to use AI in a way that is consonant with their national ethical principles, termed the 'AI Partnership for Defense' in 2020. For example, the US has a policy of human permission needed in order to trigger the automatic kill chains. In 2021 the 28th Secretary of defense committed to the department's ethical use of AI capabilities in a "responsible, equitable, traceable, reliable, and governable" way.

In 2019 the 27th Secretary of Defense Mark Esper identified the Indo-Pacific Theater as the priority theater for the United States. A multi-domain task force for the Indo-Pacific Theater is planned for a Defender exercise. However, in light of the DoD 60-day travel ban due to the COVID-19 pandemic, the number of CONUS-based troops participating in Defender Europe 2020 was reduced to those troops already in Europe.

COVID-19 has been a 'wake up call to DoD' —Matthew Donovan

In 2020 the Army lost 3 NTC training rotations to COVID-19.

JWA 20 was intended to exercise Multi-domain operations, and multinational forces, in EUCOM for 2020. (Note: See: Vostok 2018) EUCOM's Multi-domain task force is to be smaller than the Pacific's task force. It is expected that the task forces are to be employed in the Defender exercises in both EUCOM and the Pacific. Defender Europe 2020 was to test the ability to deploy 20,000 Soldiers across Europe, for a 37,000-member exercise.

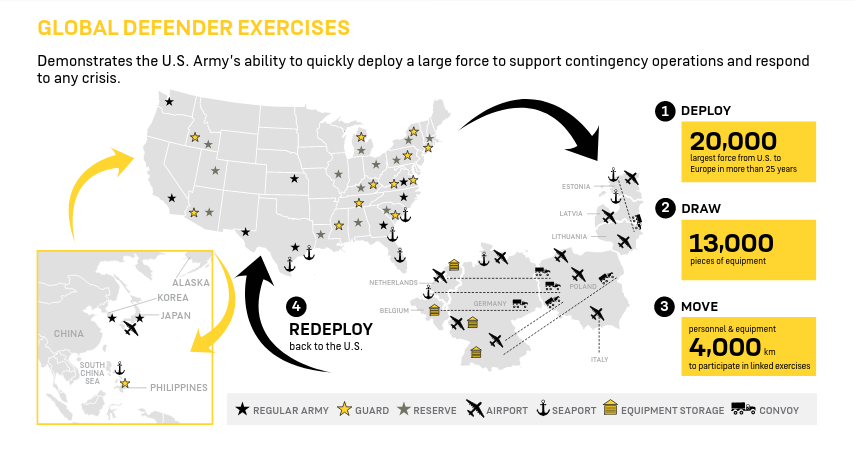
Defender Europe 2020, a division-sized exercise was cancelled during the COVID-19 pandemic.

- Elements of the 1st Cavalry, 82nd Airborne, 1st Armored, 1st Infantry, and 3rd Infantry Divisions, 11 National Guard states and seven Army Reserve units were to rapidly deploy.
  1. Reception, staging, onward movement and integration (RSOI) of a division-sized formation in EUCOM. A National Guard Brigade was to draw from pre-positioned stocks in EUCOM.
  2. An immediate response force from 82nd Airborne Division was to conduct joint forcible entries. (Note: 82nd Airborne (with 18,000 troops) has an 18-hour readiness status (after the first phone call))
  3. A division command post spread across Europe was to conduct JWA 20, to test multi-domain operations (MDO) and other Futures Command capabilities, such as an initial prototype of Tactical Intelligence Targeting Access Node (TITAN), a ground station for integrating the data feed between "sensors and shooters".
    - While in Europe, the units were to spread out across the region for separate exercises with allies and partners to participate in their annual exercises.
  4. A river crossing (see M1074 Joint Assault Bridge), forward passages of lines (one unit passes through a position held by another unit), and a maritime off-load mission was to have been conducted.
  5. Army forces were to clear the training areas, return pre-positioned stocks, consolidate, and redeploy (in this case, to home station). Returning troops were ordered to quarantine for two weeks without experiencing any flu-like symptoms. Social distancing, masks, and other protective measures were employed, in response to the COVID-19 pandemic.
- Defender Europe 2021 ran from March til June 2021, involving dozens of operations, using 28,000 troops from 26 countries, from the Baltic nations to Morocco. Defender Europe 2021 integrated a V Corps command post exercise in preparation for operations with a multi-national division. Allies and partners were to participate in the chain of command, as well.{{efn|name=defEu21 |1=

DEFENDER Europe 21 was a large-scale U.S. Army-led, multinational, joint exercise designed to build readiness and interoperability between U.S., NATO and partner militaries. DEFENDER Europe 21 included a greater number of NATO ally and partner nations conducting activities over a wider area than what was planned for in 2020, which was severely restricted due to the COVID-19 pandemic. More than 28,000 multinational forces from 26 nations conducted near-simultaneous operations across more than 30 training areas in a dozen countries. DEFENDER Europe 21 also included significant involvement of the U.S. Air Force and U.S. Navy. The exercise utilized key ground and maritime routes bridging Europe, Asia and Africa. The exercise incorporated new or high-end capabilities including air and missile defense assets, as well as assets from the U.S. Army Security Force Assistance Brigades and the recently reactivated V Corps. Defender Europe 21 was one of the largest U.S.-Army, NATO-led military exercises in Europe in decades. The exercise began in mid-March and lasted until June 2021. It included "nearly simultaneous operations across more than 30 training areas" in Estonia, Bulgaria, Romania, Kosovo and other countries. Gen. Christopher G. Cavoli, commanding general of the United States Army Europe and Africa, said that "While we are closely monitoring the COVID situation, we've proven we have the capability to train safely despite the pandemic." Russian Defense Minister Sergey Shoigu said that Russia has deployed troops to its western borders for "combat training exercises" in response to NATO "military activities that threaten Russia."

In April 2019 Germany's 1st Panzer Division took the role of exercise High Command (HICON) at Hohenfels Training Area, primarily for German 21st Armored Brigade, the Lithuanian Iron Wolf Brigade, and their subordinate units; 5,630 participants from 15 nations took part in this Joint multinational exercise, which rotates the lead among the coalition partners. The German division already had Dutch, British and Polish officers within its ranks. The Army's 2nd Battalion, 34th Armored Regiment, took part in the exercise. Six engineering advisor teams from 1st Security Force Assistance Brigade provided hands-on experience and testing of secure communications between NATO allies and partners.

A reciprocal exchange of general officers between France and the US is taking place in 2019, under the U.S. Army Military Personnel Exchange Program (MPEP). Such programs with the UK, Australia, and Canada have already existed with the US. A reciprocal pact for US and UK capabilities in Future Vertical Lift aircraft and Long Range Precision Fires artillery was signed in July 2020. The UK and Australia are planning to participate in the US Army's Project Convergence 2022.

In April 2021, the Army announced that EUCOM's Multi-domain task force (MDTF), and a Theater Fires Command, 56th Artillery Command to control it, are to deploy to the European Theater, and are based in Wiesbaden, Germany. The Fires command is a headquarters to coordinate Long range fires (for ranges from 300 miles to thousands of miles) for the European theater. The 2nd MDTF (initially consisting of a headquarters element; an intelligence, cyberspace, electronic warfare, and space detachment; and a brigade support company) was activated at Clay Kaserne in Wiesbaden on September 16, 2021. On 10 July 2024, it was announced that the United States will begin episodic deployments of the long-range fires capabilities of its MDTF in Germany in 2026. When fully developed, they will include SM-6, Tomahawk, and developmental hypersonic weapons

In April 2021, 3000 headquarters-level troops, including UK 3rd Division and French 3rd Division, came to Fort Hood to exercise Corps-level and Division-level staffs on Large-scale combat operations (LSCO). The Mission Command Center of Excellence (MCCoE) provided Opposing forces (OPFOR) and multiple dilemmas for the Warfighters to train on. III Armored Corps commander Pat White stated "the key goal of the exercise, to build international partnerships and increase interoperability, was realized". British and French commanders noted the need to further develop electronic warfare and signals intelligence capabilities.

In May 2021, 7th Army Training Command led Dynamic Front 21 (DF21), a USAEUR-AF exercise in integrating joint fires for artillery units from 15 nations. The exercise was meant to increase the readiness, lethality, and interoperability for nearly 1800 artillery troops from the 15 nations at Camp Aachen, Germany. Later locations for DF21 included Vilseck Army Air Field, Germany, Grafenwoehr Training Area, Germany, and Torun, Poland.

=== V Corps FOC ===
In October 2021 V Corps attained Full operational capability (FOC) by completing Warfighter exercise 22-1 (WFX 22-1), in a series of command post exercises in Large scale combat operations (LSCO). The operations involved a combatant command, Active Army, Reserve and National Guard components, a Theater training command, and a sustainment command, as well as multi-national partners. V Corps was slated to lead the Defender Europe 22, as of October 2021.

In 2020 the Secretary of the Army announced 5-month extended rotations to United States Indo-Pacific Command countries such as Thailand, the Philippines, and Papua New Guinea. Multi-Domain Operations (MDO) task forces in the region have already been engaging in MDO-like exercises in concert with the armed forces of Japan, Thailand, and Singapore.

Two Multi-domain task forces are being requested for Indo-Pacom for 2021. 5th Security Force Assistance Brigade is regionally aligned with USINDOPACOM, and plans to keep one-third of the brigade's advisor teams there at all times, while the other teams train at home station (JBLM), for their assignments in the region. The third and fourth ABMS Onramp exercises of Joint all-domain command and control (JADC2) are being planned in 2020, and 2021 for INDOPACOM, and EUCOM respectively. This is meant to bring key US allies into the planning for the Joint All-Domain Operations Concept, thereby enabling their "participation in planning, execution and then debrief" after a coalition exercise in overmatching the adversary, and maintaining a Common Operating Picture (COP), to review measured responses, both kinetic and nonkinetic. The COVID-19 pandemic actually provided the impetus for rapid fielding of a DoD technology for separating Top secret, Secret, and Unclassified messaging, a necessary function for the Intelligence community. (Note: In 2021 an MDTF exercised its sensor-to-shooter capabilities in operational vignettes at Joint Systems Integration Lab (JSIL, Aberdeen MD).) The JSIL connection of experimental networks with Army battle labs is a way to determine the bandwidth needed for these vignettes, to prepare Project Convergence 2021 for Joint All-Domain Command and Control (JADC2).

Defender Pacific 2021 focuses on the southwest Pacific region. The Army was to draw from a pre-positioned stock for its units, exercise its watercraft and an MDTF's long range precision fires. In 2021 the 28th Secretary of Defense, Lloyd Austin, stated he expected to "review our posture in the Pacific from all aspects including presence, capabilities, logistics, exercises, infrastructure, and capacity building and cooperation with allies and partners" during his questioning by the Senate Armed Services Committee. Integrated deterrence is the objective of the 28th Secretary of defense, in joint exercises in Australian waters, with HMS Queen Elizabeth (R08) in the South China Sea, and by US Special Forces soldiers (Green Berets) with Japan's Self-defense force (JGSDF) parachuting onto Guam. On 15 September 2021 the ministers of defense, and foreign affairs, and the secretaries of defense, and state for Australia, and the US, respectively, namely Peter Dutton, Marise Payne, Lloyd Austin, and Antony Blinken signed statements of intent to jointly build nuclear submarines, and share National Reconnaissance Office (NRO) data, as well as a space framework. See AUKUS. On 24 September 2021 the heads of state of Australia, India, Japan, and the US (the Quadrilateral Security Dialog) met face-to-face to discuss cybersecurity, and fix supply chain vulnerabilities, such as electronic chip, and 5G technology. FY2021 marks the end of the Army's manpower expansion, in its effort to modernize.

=== Arctic strategy ===
In January 2021 the Army announced its arctic strategy, for arctic, extreme cold, and mountainous environments, which affect the NORTHCOM, EUCOM, and INDOPACOM combatant commands. Combined Arms Doctrine is being updated for the Arctic regions in 2024. A two-star multi-domain-enabled operational headquarters was established for the Arctic. Soldiers will be receiving extra support for adapting to the Alaskan Arctic, beginning in 2022 and going forward. The BCTs of US Army Alaska reflagged as of 6 June 2022, from 1st SBCT/25th ID, and 4th IBCT (Abn)/25th ID, to 1st IBCT/11th Abn Div, and 2nd IBCT (Abn)/11th Abn Div respectively; US Army Alaska is now 11th Airborne Division as of 6 June 2022. The Bundeswehr is thinking of training in Alaska. An Arctic Multi-domain task force (MDTF) was planned, to balance the interests of the 8 partners of the Arctic Council, which include Russia, and China as an observer nation.

=== Defender Europe 2022 ===
Defender Europe 2022 started 3 May 2022, under the command and control of V Corps, which has had a forward-deployed Headquarters in Europe since 2021. The exercises will involve 11 allied and partner nations, including Denmark, Estonia, Germany, France, Latvia, Lithuania, Netherlands, Poland, Slovakia, Sweden, and Great Britain. Defender Europe 2022 had been previously planned, on a longer timescale than the wartime events of 2022, such as the 2022 Russian invasion of Ukraine. (Note: As part of the Warfighter exercises 22-1, which completed in October 2021, V Corps attained Full operational capability. The Army alternates its annual Defender exercises between the Pacific and Europe. Thus V Corps was preparing for the Eucom exercises of 2022 in 2021. The COVID pandemic disrupted the 2020 European exercises, however.) For example, a float ribbon bridge was erected by troops from Fort Hood, Texas who are deploying to Europe. The bridge came from pre-positioned stocks drawn from APS-2, located in Europe.

=== PC22 ===
Australia, New Zealand, the UK, Canada, and other allies and partners (such as universities) expect they will bring experiments or prototype capabilities to Project Convergence 2022. PC22 will require connection of the allies and partners; the connections were exercised during COMMEX 1B in June. Global defender 2022 (GD22) will culminate with Project Convergence 2022 (PC22). In the week of 6 Jun 2022 planning for PC22 at Fort Bliss was finalized. The UK and Australian planners were added to the PC22 experiment; their concepts join the 100 technologies incorporated by USAF, Navy, Marines, and Space Force planners. The commander of AFC's Futures and Concepts Lieutenant Gen. Scott McKean, and peers for the services and allies took this opportunity to mutually review their plans for the FY2022 event.

The Synthetic Training Environment's One World Terrain (OWT) data sets are beginning to be used as operational planning tools, for example by V corps, and at PC20, and at PC21. As virtual maps, rather than paper maps, they can project scenarios which will also be used at PC22 in October and November 2022.

In October 2022, the experiments from the previous Project Convergence were scaled up, from just Army in PC21 to joint and international exercises in PC22. AI was utilized not just for autonomous flight, but also for predicting where logistics would be needed in contested environments. PC22 experimented with some 300 technologies. Scenarios during PC22 included Tomahawk, SM-6, and LRHW missiles. 82nd Airborne participated in the PC22 experiments, using newly developed equipment.

In November 2022, at PC22, the use of an uncrewed Black Hawk helicopter under autonomous control was demonstrated in a contested logistics exercise.

=== Defender 2023 ===
In April 2023 Defender 23, a logistics exercise of US Army Europe and Africa was transported to Naval Station Rota, Spain. Spain was the host nation for 5-159th GSAB (5th Battalion, a general support aviation battalion of the 159th Aviation Regiment). 5th Battalion is an Army Reserve unit out of Fort Eustis, Virginia. The aviation materiel included CH-47s, Sikorsky UH-60 Black Hawks, and supporting equipment.

=== PC24 ===
Project Convergence co-locates from WSMR and YPG (the hub), to allies and partners. PC24 could occur by spring 2024. Project Convergence Capstone 4, or PC-C4 occurs from 23 February 2024 to 20 March 2024 at Camp Pendleton and Fort Irwin. Project Overmatch is now installed on three carrier strike groups for PC-C4 (2024).

By 7 March 2024 Project Convergence was realizing messaging/ targeting times of seconds, down from several-minute intervals.

=== Steadfast Defender 2024 ===
Steadfast Defender 2024 is planned from February through May 2024 in Europe, involving 90,000 NATO troops.

=== Project Convergence Capstone 5 ===
Project Convergence Capstone 5 (PC-C5) will be the earliest opportunity to see Next Generation Command and Control (NGC2) operation of the Integrated Tactical Network. PC-C5 exercises will take place in the March and April 2025 time frame; a summary press conference is scheduled in May 2025.

At Project Convergence Capstone 6 (PC-C6), in 2026 the Next Generation Command and Control's (NGC2) integrated data layer will be operating at the division+ level, meaning at a level ready for the staff of a corps.

== Dynamic force employment ==
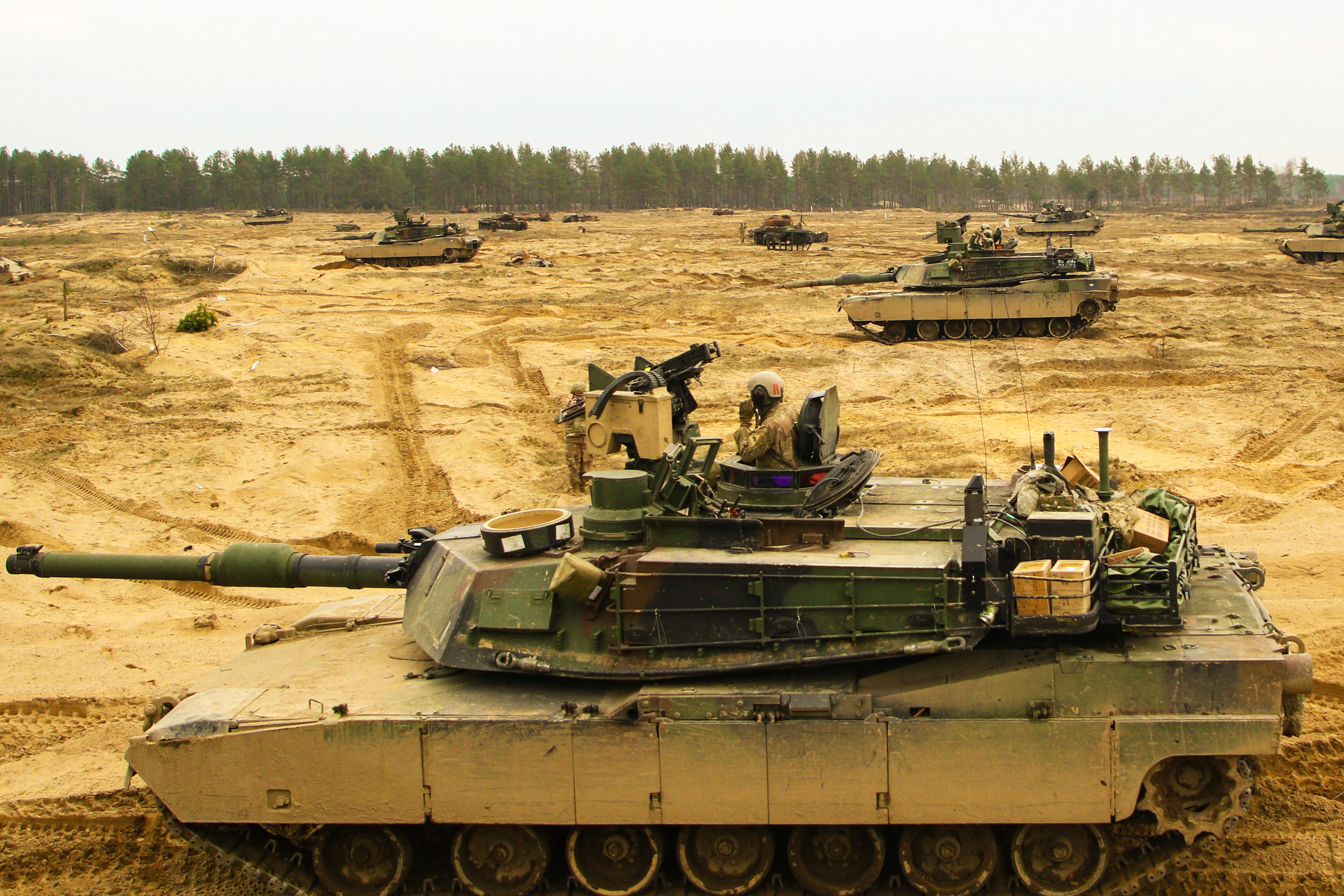
2nd Armored Brigade Combat Team (ABCT), 1st Armored Division (2/1AD) element in a snap deployment from Fort Bliss to Drawsko Pomorskie training area, Poland, 29 March 2019

This initiative, designed by then-DoD-Secretary James Mattis, exercises the ability of selected BCTs to rapidly surge combat-ready forces into a theater, such as EUCOM, on short notice. In several such cases, at the direction of the Secretary of Defense in March 2019, troops were rapidly alerted, recalled and deployed to a forward position, under (simulated) emergency conditions, to prove a capability (such as an ABCT, and a THAAD battery) against near-peers. The ABCT element next participated in a joint live-fire exercise with Polish troops of the 12th Mechanized Brigade, 12th Mechanised Division (Poland) in Drawsko Pomorskie Training Area, Poland. (A Mission Command element of TRADOC served in the role of echelon-above-brigade for the maneuver and interoperability of the joint multi-national armored brigades.) In September 2018, the 278th Armored Cavalry Regiment had already assumed a forward deployment in Poland. Poland and the US are planning for regular rotations going forward. A Combat Aviation Brigade element, an Armored Combat Brigade element, and a Division Headquarters element will rotate in.

Similar initiatives are planned for other alliances.

In August 2020 Poland agreed to pay almost all costs associated with US presence in the country; a forward command post for V Corps in Poland has been codified in an Enhanced Defense Cooperation Agreement between the US and Poland. Poland is buying 250 M1A2 Abrams tanks as of 14 July 2021. Poland ordered an additional 116 used M1A1 Abrams tanks, with faster delivery dates on 15 July 2022. The first 14 of an expected 42 M1A1 Abrams tanks arrived in Poland on 28 June 2023; the 42 will comprise one tank battalion; the 42 tanks are to be the 2023 tranche of 116 M1A1 tanks for Poland.

In addition to tanks, Poland is buying attack helicopters, Patriot missiles, HIMARS, and F-35s. Poland is buying 96 AH-64E Apaches (to equip six squadrons). Naval Strike Missiles, and LTAMDS missile defense radars. Poland is seeking more HIMARS rockets and launchers, with an eye toward local rocket production in the future. In July 2022, six IBCS Engagement Operations Centers attained basic operational capability in Poland, and are a component for JADC2.

FORSCOM exercised its Emergency deployment readiness exercises (EDREs) in 2019 by sending 2nd Brigade Combat Team, 10th Mountain Division to the Joint Readiness Training Center in Fort Polk, Louisiana, by sealift, simultaneously exercising the logistics planners at Fort Drum, the seaports in Philadelphia, Pennsylvania, and Port Arthur, Texas, as well as 2nd BCT. Through the EDRE program, 20 of the ports have been exercised to ready them for sealift deployments. A division-sized move of 20,000 pieces of equipment from the US to Europe began a month-long process in January 2020. In 2020 the pre-COVID-19 plan was "wide-spanning maneuvers will focus on the Baltic States, Poland, and Georgia" (at the time) which would have involved 36,000 troops from 11 countries ranging from the Baltic to the Black Seas, a number still in flux. A number of the Defender-2020 objectives were met in 2020, despite a 60-day travel ban by DoD.

By 2020 the 27th Secretary of Defense signaled that ABMS, its Internet of Military Things, and JADC2 were important parts for Dynamic force employment (DFE) in the Joint All-domain Operations Concept. The Combatant commanders at Eucom, and at IndoPacom sought the AGM-183A (ARRW) hypersonic weapon on the bomber fleet for Dynamic force employment.

In light of the 2022 Russian invasion of Ukraine, thousands more troops have posted or rotated to Europe. As of February 2023 the US is planning a HIMARS training center in Poland. In order to get 31 Abrams tanks to Ukraine, the Army is weighing options with the fastest delivery times, none of which are sooner than year-end 2023. (Note: Poland, Australia, Egypt, Iraq, Kuwait, Saudi Arabia, Morocco, and Taiwan are M1 Abrams customers.) The production of 155mm artillery shells is being ramped up in the US' organic industrial base as well.

In 2024 elements of the 11th Airborne Division, and two Multi-domain Task Forces (the 1st MDTF, and the 3rd MDTF) were rapidly deployed to Shemya Island, Alaska in the western Aleutian island chain, in response to Russian air and maritime activity. See § Arctic strategy

=== Force structure changes ===
On 27 February 2024 the Army announced that its Active-Component's authorized force structure would decrease from 494,000 to 470,000 soldiers by FY2029. The change includes an increase of 7500 soldiers for high-priority formations such as Multi-domain task forces (MDTFs), Indirect fire protection capability (IFPC) battalions, which includes counter-small unmanned aerial systems (C-sUAS) batteries, and the Maneuver Short-Range Air Defense (M-SHORAD) battalions. There will be a decrease of 32,000 positions which are currently unfilled or overstaffed, such as in Special Operations Forces. No soldiers will be asked to leave the Force. The Army will continue to recruit more soldiers. (Note: The current authorized force level is 445,000 but the force design was for 494,000.)

=== ISR and drone warfare ===
In 2020 the Second Nagorno-Karabakh War and the Russo-Ukrainian War had influenced planning for the Army of 2030, but funding pressure led to cancellation of the US Army's Future Attack Reconnaissance Aircraft (FARA) on 8 February 2024.

=== Space Force Futures Command ===
In February 2024 the department of the Air Force announced its intention to create the Space Futures Command.

=== NATO support in 2024 ===
An increase in NATO defense spending is expected in 2024.

== See also ==
- 1st Multi-Domain Task Force, at Joint Base Lewis–McChord (WA)
- 2nd Multi-Domain Task Force, in Mainz Kastel (Germany) (assigned to Multi-Domain Command Europe)
- 3rd Multi-Domain Task Force, at Fort Shafter (HI)
- 4th Multi-Domain Task Force, at Fort Carson (CO)
- 5th Multi-Domain Task Force, Fort Bragg (NC) (FY28)
