= 3rd Multi-Domain Task Force =

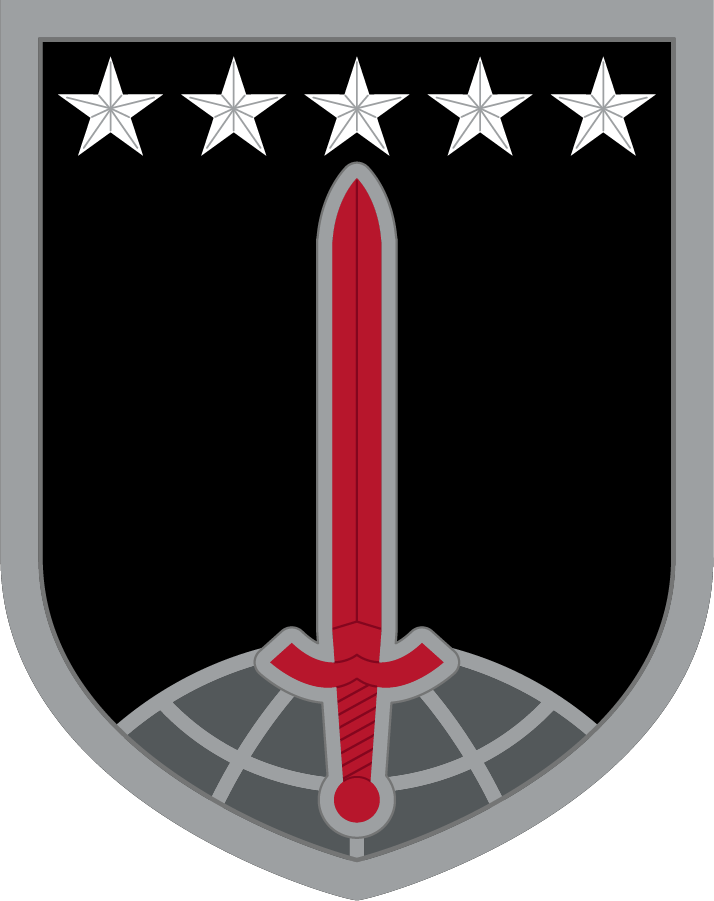
- Active: 2022 - present
- Country: United States
- Branch: United States Army
- Type: Task Force
- Part of: US Army Pacific
- Garrison/HQ: Fort Shafter, Hawaii
- Motto: Hunt Forward

Commanders
- Current commander: Col. Wade A. Germann

Insignia
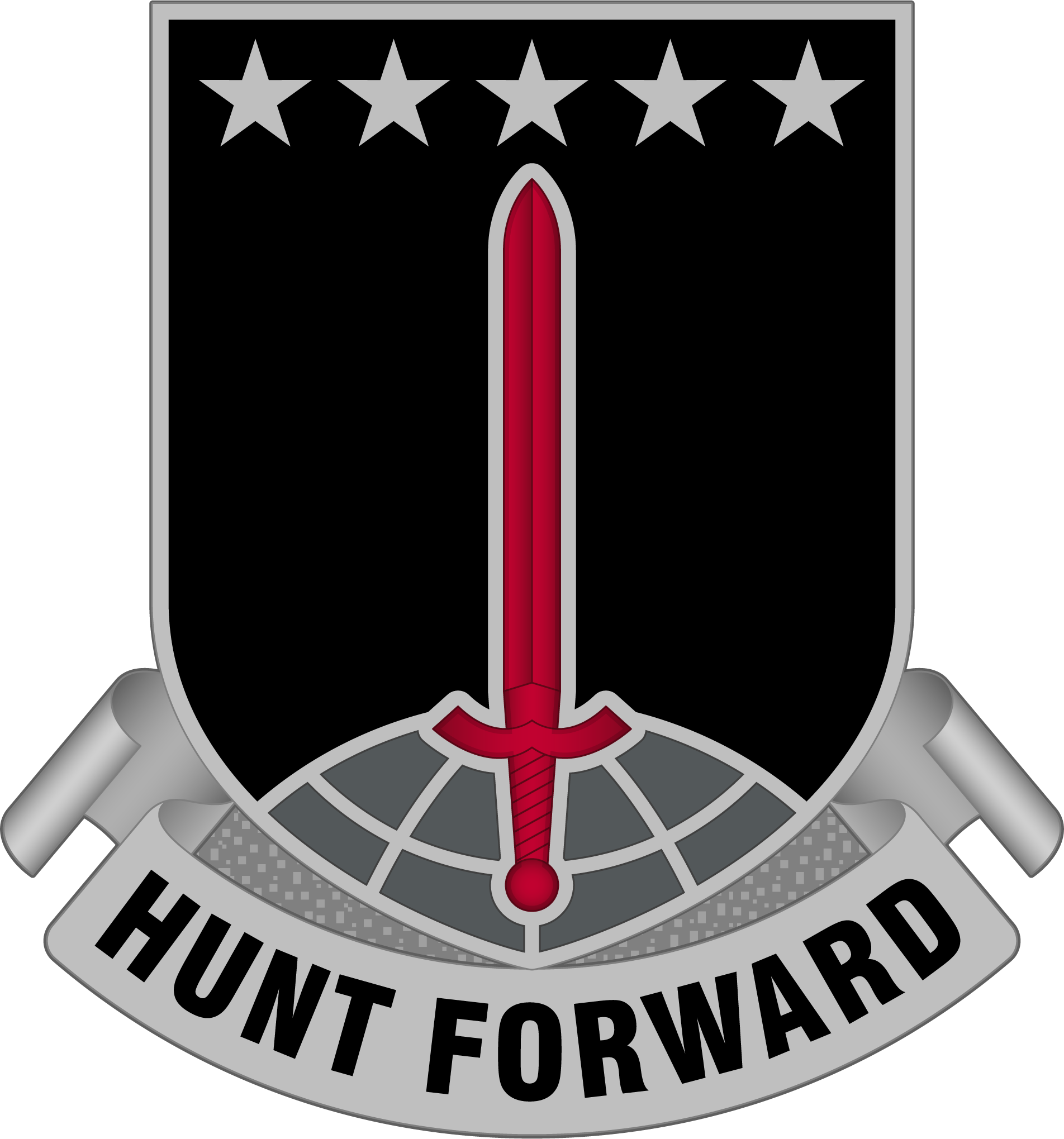
- 3rd Multi-Domain Task Force DUI

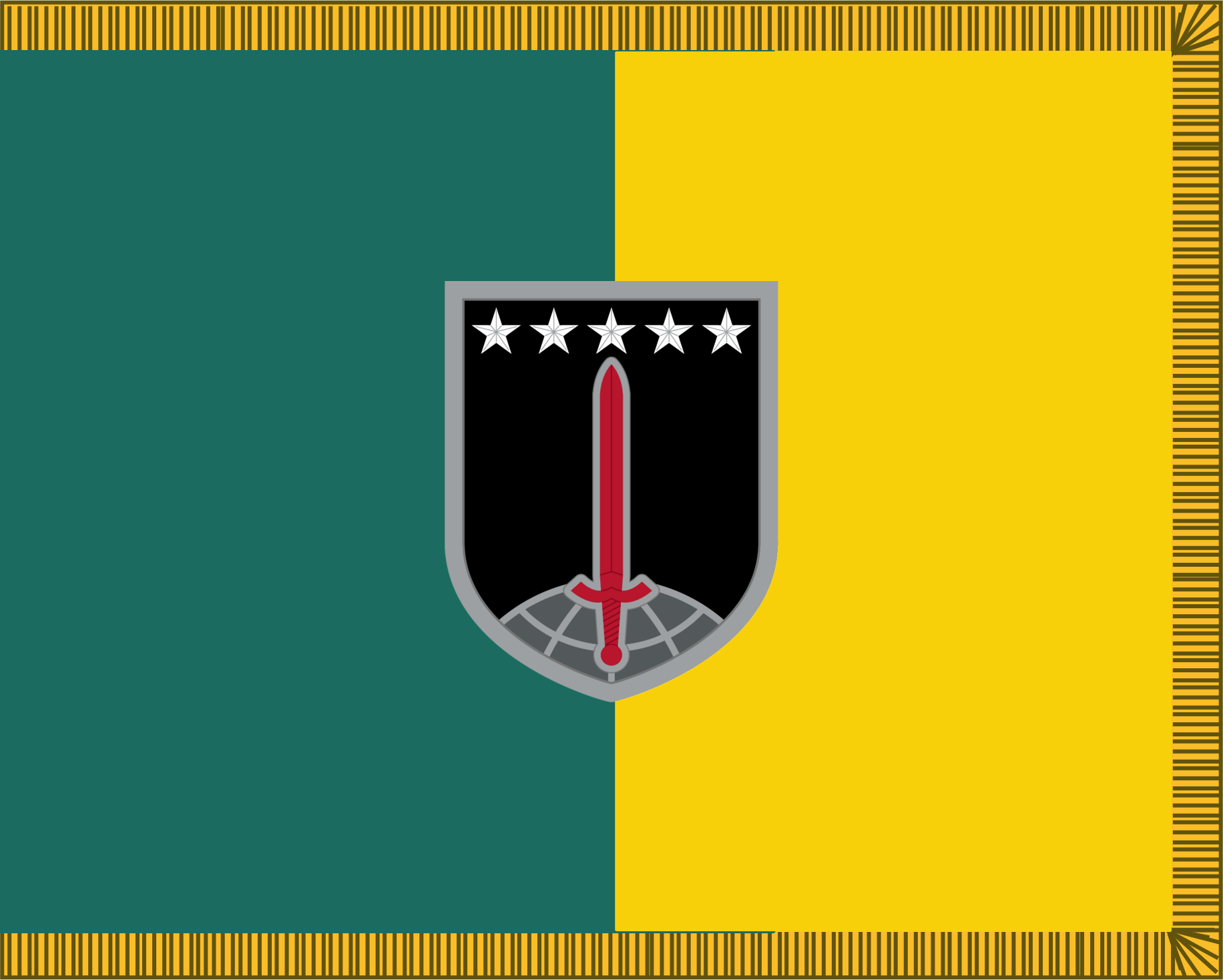
- 3rd Multi Domain Task Force Flag

The 3rd Multi-Domain Task Force (3MDTF) is a US Army multi-domain operations unit that will integrate cyberspace, space, land, sea, and air operations into one fighting unit as part of the Transformation of the Army / Aimpoint 2035. The unit was activated in 2022 at Fort Shafter, Hawaii. The 3MDTF capabilities include Autonomous Multi-Domain Launchers (AML), Precision Strike Missiles (PrSM), high-altitude balloons (HABs) and the Vanilla Ultra-Long Endurance Unmanned Aircraft System. The 3MDTF has deployed the LRHW (Long-Range Hypersonic Weapon) "Dark Eagle," Tomahawk Land Attack Missiles, as well as the SM-6 Typhon missile system in August 2025.

== Organization ==
- 3rd Multi-Domain Task Force
  - Headquarters and Headquarters Battalion
  - 3rd Multi-Domain Effects Battalion
  - 1st Battalion, 17th Field Artillery Regiment (Long-Range Fires Battalion (1-17 LRFB) equipped with M142 HIMARS and Long-Range Hypersonic Weapon)
  - Indirect Fire Protection Capability Battalion (IFPC) (to be formed)
  - Task Force Sustainment Battalion (to be formed)
    - 560th Brigade Support Company

== See also ==
- 1st Multi-Domain Task Force
- 2nd Multi-Domain Task Force
- 4th Multi-Domain Task Force
