= 10th Field Artillery Regiment =

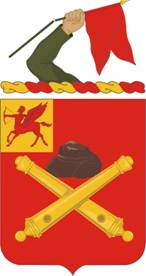
- Coat of arms
- Active: 1916 — 2015; 2026 —
- Country: United States
- Branch: Army
- Type: Field artillery
- Size: Approx 320
- Patron: Saint Barbara
- Motto: "The Rock’s Support"
- Branch color: Scarlet

Insignia
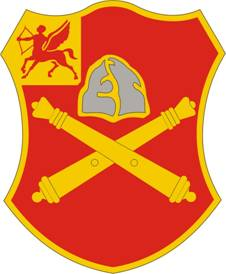
- Distinctive unit insignia

The 10th Field Artillery Regiment was a Field Artillery regiment of the United States Army first formed in 1916. Due to the inactivation of the Third Armored Brigade Combat Team, 3rd Infantry Division, the last active battalion (1st battalion) of the 10th Field Artillery Regiment was inactivated in December 2015. The 1st Battalion, 10th Field Artillery Regiment was reactivated on 8 October 2028 as the Long-Range Fires Battalion of the 4th Multi-Domain Task Force.

== History ==
The 10th Field Artillery Regiment was formed at Camp Douglas in 1916. It served in France during World War I, specifically in the Champagne-Marne, St. Mihiel, Meuse-Argonne and Champagne-Marne campaigns. Its motto "The Rock's Support" was bestowed on it due to its support of the 3rd Division ("The Rock of the Marne") at the Second Battle of the Marne.

The organization was redesignated the 10th Field Artillery Battalion in 1940 and served in ten European campaigns of World War II and eight in Korea.

Reorganized to the 1st Battalion 10th Field Artillery, it was assigned to 3rd Infantry Division Artillery at Kelley Hill, Fort Benning Ga. In this configuration it saw service in Kosovo, Kuwait, and Iraq.

At various points in regimental history, the 1st, 2nd, 4th, 5th and 6th Battalions were active. 1st Battalion is now inactive.

== Distinctive unit insignia ==
- Description

A Gold metal and enamel device 1 inch (2.54 cm) in height consisting of a shield blazoned: Gules, a rock Proper resting on two cannons in saltire Or. On a canton of the last a winged centaur courant holding a bent bow and arrow of the field (for the 6th Field Artillery).

- Symbolism

The shield is red for Artillery, the parent organization being shown by its crest placed on the canton. The 38th Infantry earned the sobriquet of "The Rock of the Marne" and this regiment is therefore entitled to the motto "The Rock’s Support," and it is shown by the two cannons supporting a rock.

- Background

The distinctive unit insignia was originally approved for the 10th Field Artillery Regiment on 16 April 1923. It was redesignated for the 10th Field Artillery Battalion on 15 December 1942. The insignia was redesignated for the 10th Artillery Regiment on 22 January 1958. It was again redesignated for the 10th Field Artillery Regiment on 2 December 1971.

== Coat of arms ==
- Blazon
  - Shield: Gules, a rock Proper resting on two cannons in saltire Or. On a canton of the last a winged centaur courant holding a bent bow and arrow of the field (for the 6th Field Artillery). And for unofficial use pendant to escutcheon a French Croix de Guerre with gilt star Proper.
  - Crest: On a wreath of the colors Or and Gules a dexter arm embowed habited in Olive Drab grasping a Red guidon on a broken staff all Proper.
  - Motto: The Rock's Support.
- Symbolism
  - Shield: The shield is red for Artillery, the parent organization being shown by its crest placed on the canton. The 38th Infantry earned the sobriquet of "The Rock of the Marne" and this regiment is therefore entitled to the motto "The Rock’s Support," and it is shown by the two cannons supporting a rock.
  - Crest: The crest symbolizes the honorable loss and recapture of its guns.
- Background

The coat of arms was originally approved for the 10th Field Artillery Regiment on 6 June 1921. It was amended to include history on 13 September 1923. The insignia was redesignated for the 10th Field Artillery Battalion on 15 December 1942. It was again redesignated for the 10th Artillery Regiment on 22 January 1958. The coat of arms was redesignated for the 10th Field Artillery Regiment on 2 December 1971.
