= 2nd Multi-Domain Task Force =

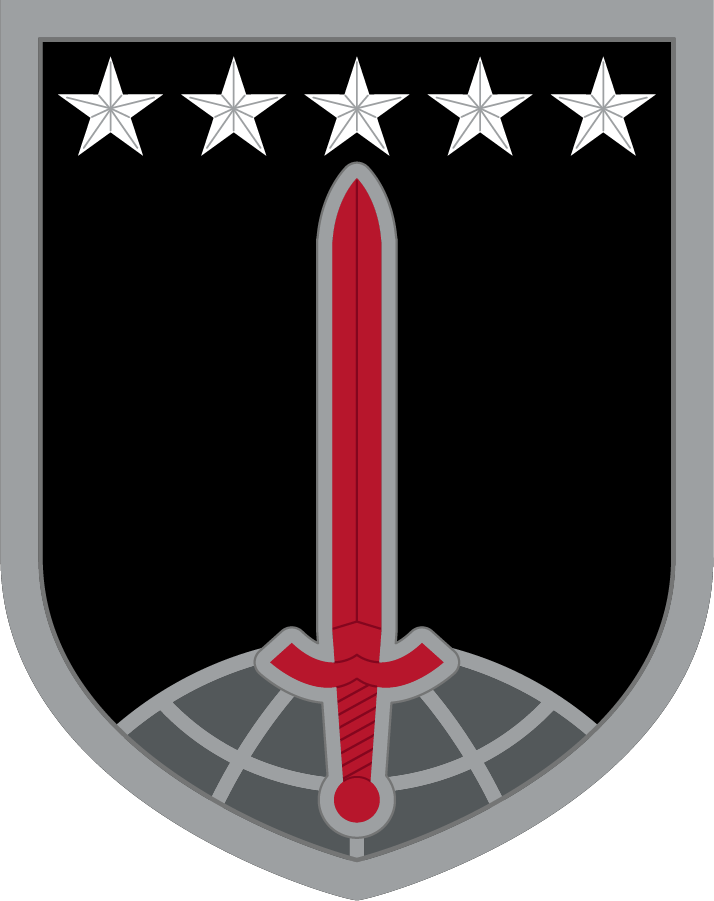
- Active: 2021 - present
- Country: United States
- Branch: United States Army
- Type: Task Force
- Part of: Multi-Domain Command Europe
- Garrison/HQ: Mainz-Kastel, Germany
- Mottos: Sword and Shield
- Website: https://www.56ac.army.mil/2d-Multi-Domain-Task-Force/

Commanders
- Current commander: Col. Jeffery W. Pickler
- Command Sergeant Major: CSM Tyler E. Bell

Insignia
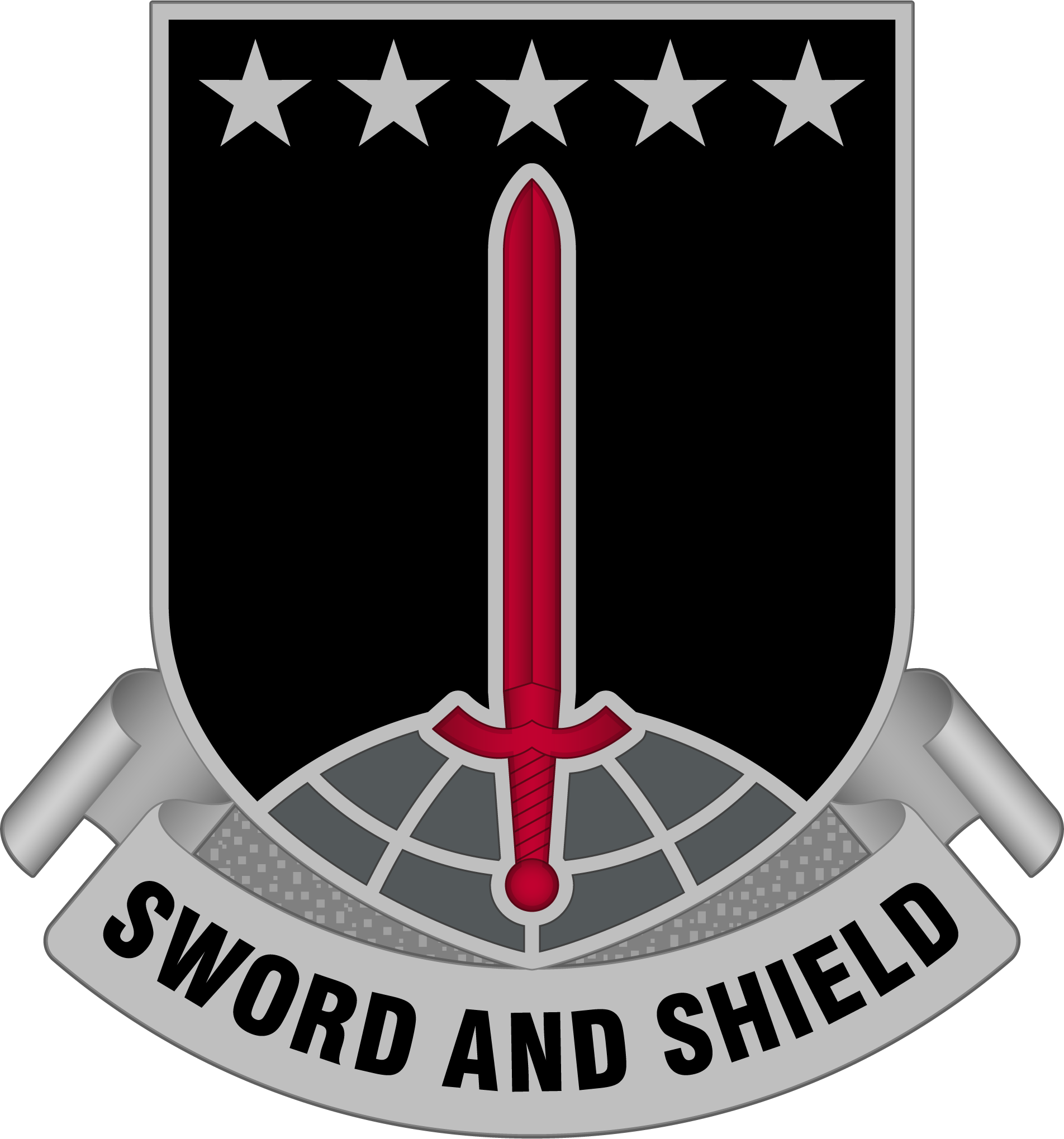
- 2nd Multi-Domain Task Force DUI

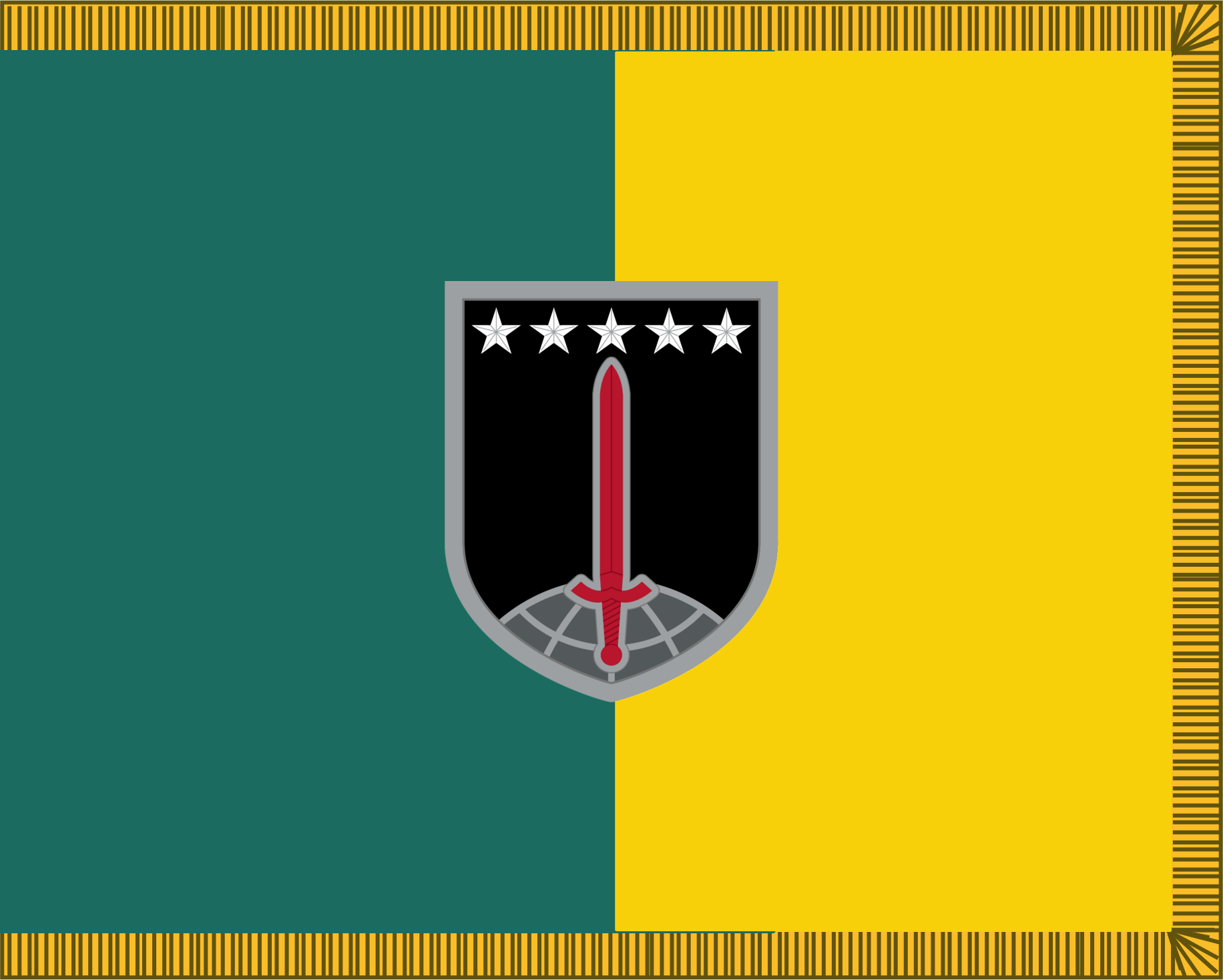
- 2nd Multi Domain Task Force Flag

The 2nd Multi-Domain Task Force (2MDTF) is a US Army multi-domain operations unit that will integrate cyberspace, space, land, sea, and air operations into one fighting unit as part of the Transformation of the Army / Aimpoint 2035. The unit was activated in 2021 in Mainz-Kastel, Germany. The 2MDTF capabilities include aerostat unmanned sensors, High Altitude Balloons (HAB), unmanned aerial surveillance drones (UAS) and will have Tomahawks and hypersonic missiles in 2026.

The Army created MDTFs to respond to Congress' desire to have forces that can oppose near-peer adversaries in Europe and Asia and provide A2/AD "Anti-Access is any action, activity, or capability designed to prevent an advancing military force from entering an operational area." In 2025, the 2MDTF experimented with 3D printed drones in keeping with Secretary of Defense Pete Hegseth and Army Secretary Dan Driscoll's push for modernization of acquisition.

== Organization ==
- 2nd Multi-Domain Task Force, in Mainz-Kastel, Germany
  - Headquarters and Headquarters Battalion
  - 2nd Multi-Domain Effects Battalion
    - Headquarters and Headquarters Company
    - Signal Company
    - Extended Range Sensing and Effects Company
    - Information Defense Company
    - Military Intelligence Company
    - Space Company
  - 3rd Battalion, 12th Field Artillery Regiment (Long-Range Fires Battalion (1-17 LRFB) at Fort Drum (NY) and equipped with M142 HIMARS and Long-Range Hypersonic Weapon)
  - Indirect Fire Protection Capability Battalion (IFPC) (to be formed)
  - Task Force Sustainment Battalion (to be formed)
    - 228th Brigade Support Company

== See also ==
- 1st Multi-Domain Task Force
- 3rd Multi-Domain Task Force
- 4th Multi-Domain Task Force
