= 1st Multi-Domain Task Force =

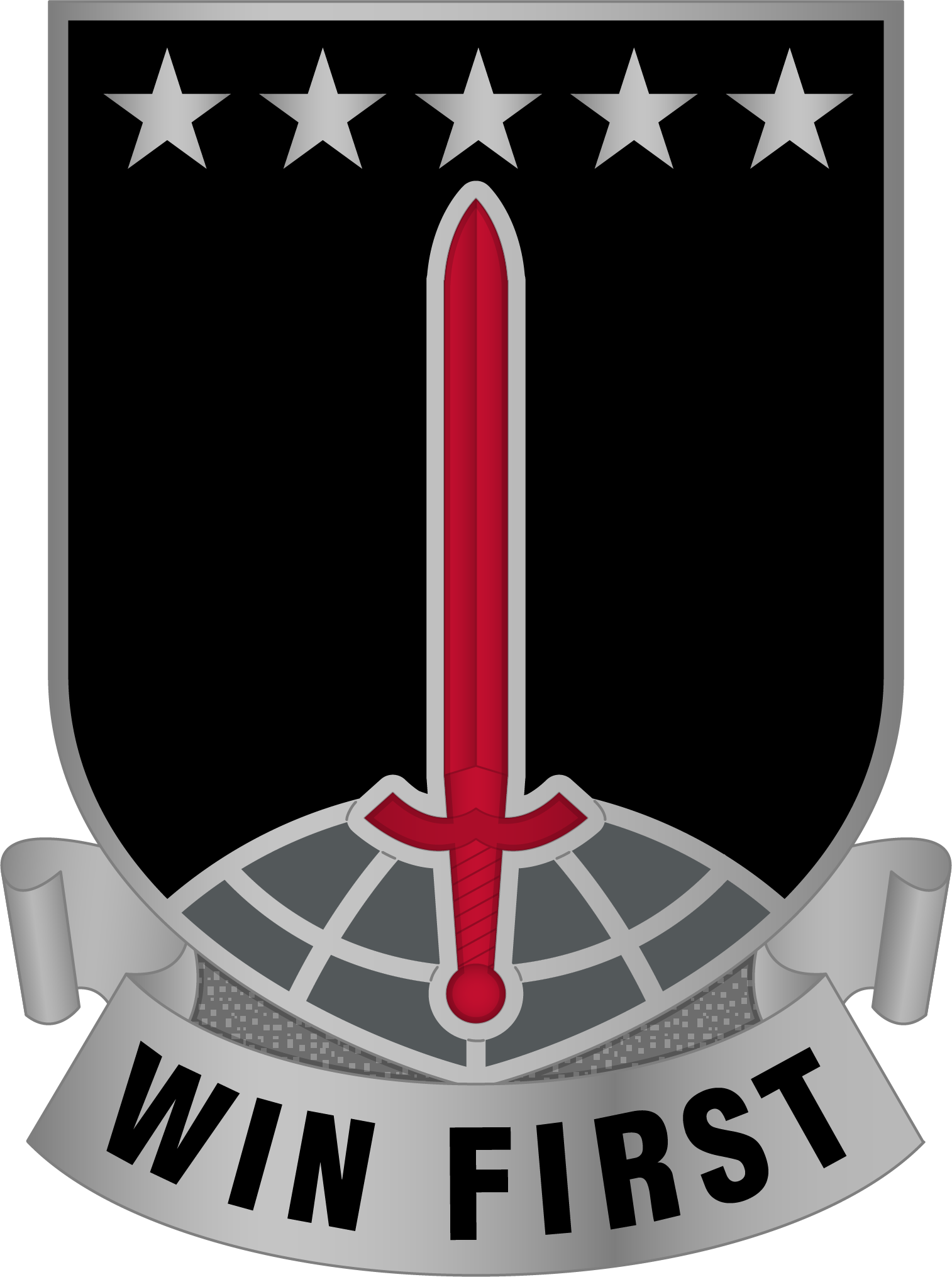
- Former 1MDTF Distinctive Unit Insignia
- Active: 2017 - 2026
- Country: United States
- Branch: United States Army
- Type: Task Force
- Size: 1,700
- Part of: 7th Infantry Division (MDC-PAC)
- Garrison/HQ: Joint Base Lewis–McChord, WA
- Motto: Win First
- Equipment: HIMARS (High Mobility Artillery Rocket System)

Insignia
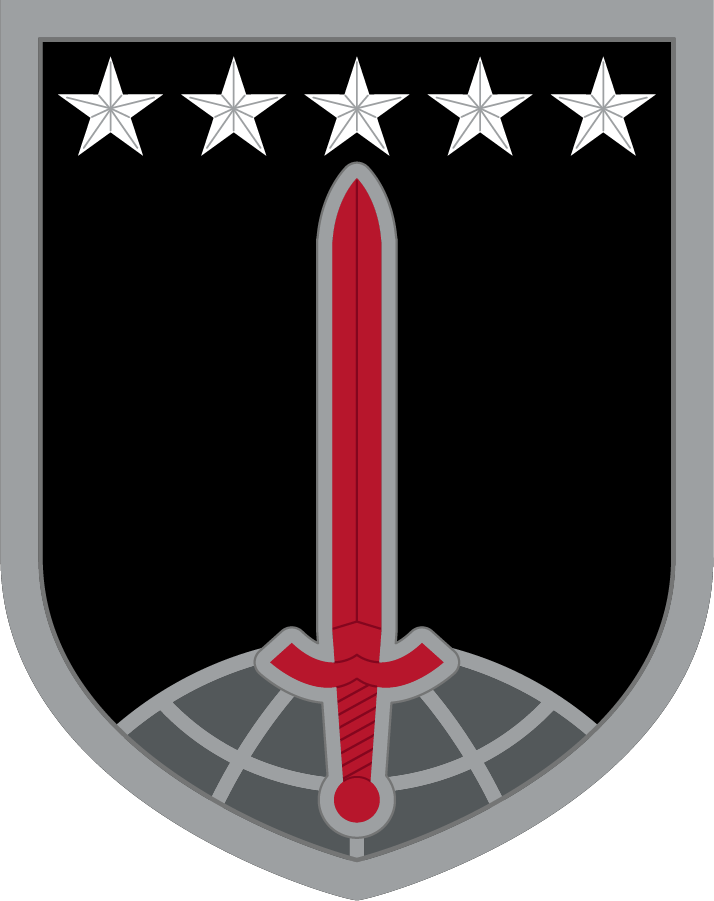
- Multi-Domain Task Force Shoulder Sleeve Insignia

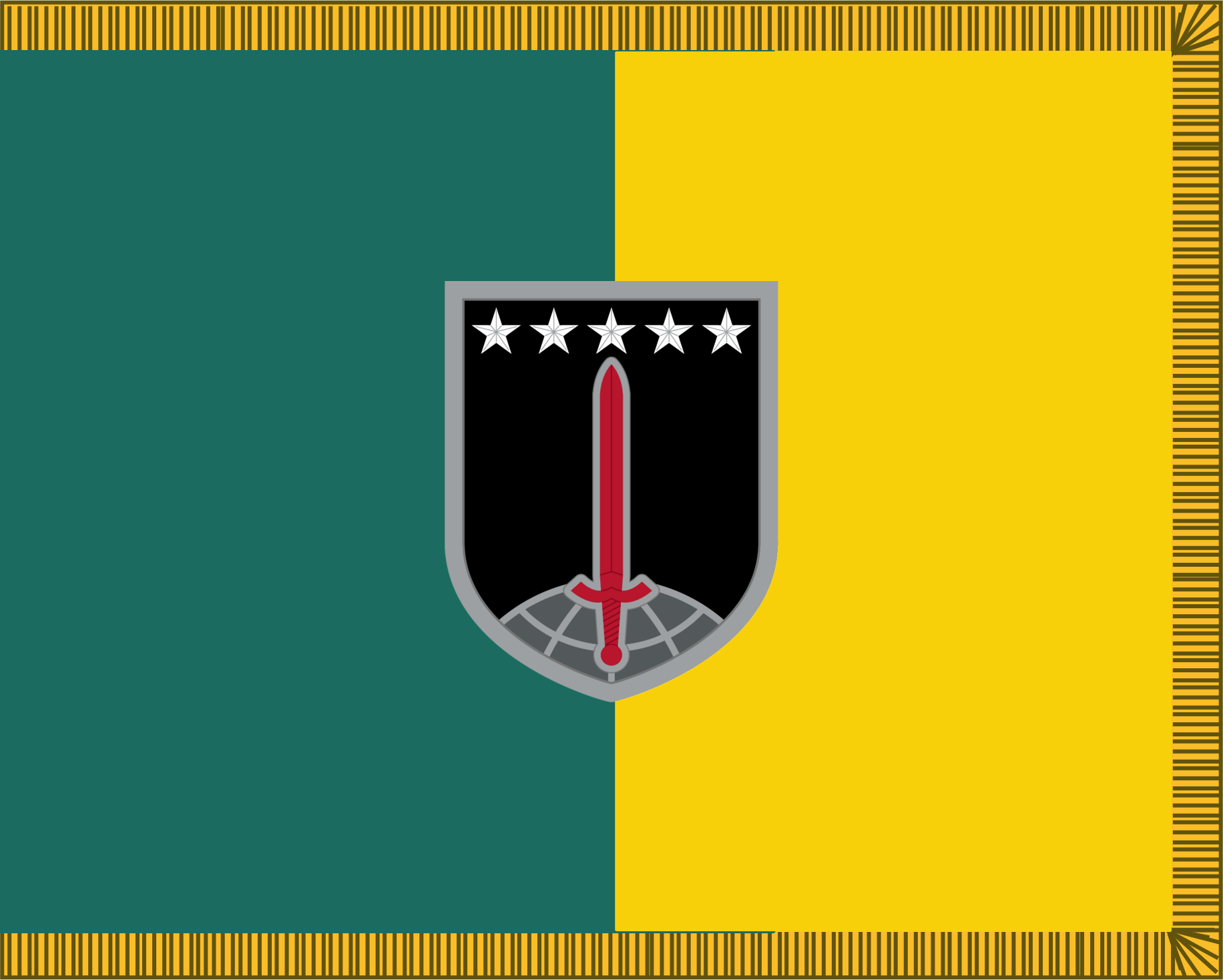
- Multi-Domain Task Force Flag

The 1st Multi-Domain Task Force (1MDTF) was the first US Army multi-domain operations unit that integrates cyberspace, space, land, sea, and air operations into one fighting unit as part of the Transformation of the Army / Aimpoint 2035. The unit was stood up in 2017 at Joint Base Lewis–McChord. In 2026, the task force was merged with the 7th Infantry Division to become the 7th Infantry Division (Multi-Domain Command Pacific). The 1MDTF capabilities included anti-access and area denial networks and long range hypersonic missiles.

The Army created MDTFs to respond to Congress' desire to have forces that can oppose near-peer adversaries in Europe and Asia and provide Anti-Access/Area Denial (A2/AD) "Anti-Access is any action, activity, or capability designed to prevent an advancing military force from entering an operational area."

As of July 2025, the 1MDTF was employing the M142 High Mobility Artillery Rocket System (HIMARS) in live fire exercises at Fort Magsaysay Military Reservation in the Philippines.

Units in 2025 included:

- Headquarters and Headquarters Battalion
- 1st Multi-Domain Effects Battalion
- 5th Battalion, 3rd Field Artillery Regiment (Long-Range Fires Battalion equipped with M142 HIMARS and Long-Range Hypersonic Weapon)
- 1st Battalion, 51st Air Defense Artillery Regiment (Indirect Fire Protection Capability Battalion)
- 1163rd Task Force Support Battalion

== See also ==
- 2nd Multi-Domain Task Force
- 3rd Multi-Domain Task Force
- 4th Multi-Domain Task Force
