= 4th Multi-Domain Task Force =

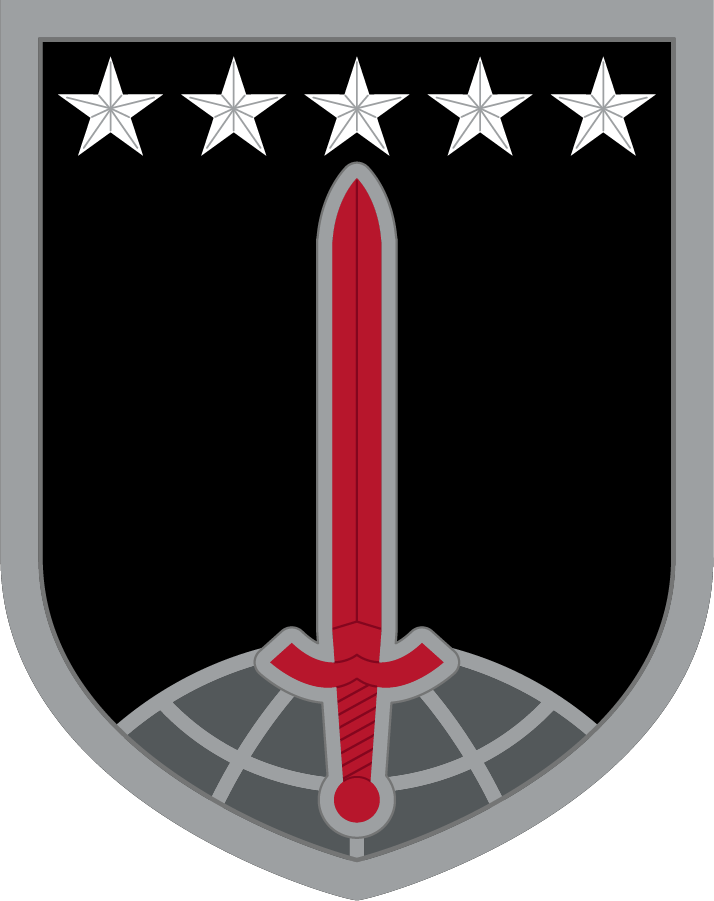
- Active: 8 October 2026 – Present
- Country: United States
- Role: Multi-Domain Operations
- Part of: 7th Infantry Division
- Garrison/HQ: Fort Carson

Commanders
- Current commander: Col. Hugh W. A. Jones
- Command Sergeant Major: CSM Garry Pruitt

The 4th Multi-Domain Task Force (4MDTF) is a US Army multi-domain operations unit that will integrate cyberspace, space, land, sea, and air operations into one fighting unit as part of the Transformation of the Army / Aimpoint 2035. The unit was activated 8 October 2026 at Fort Carson, Colorado. The unit will eventually have four battalions including long-range fires battalion (High Mobility Artillery Rocket Systems and hypersonic missiles), cyber warfare and signal intelligence battalion, an air defense battalion and a sustainment battalion.

The Army created MDTFs to respond to Congress' desire to have forces that can oppose near-peer adversaries in Europe and Asia and provide Anti-Access/Area Denial (A2/AD) "Anti-Access is any action, activity, or capability designed to prevent an advancing military force from entering an operational area."

The 4MDTF will focus on the Pacific Theater and will be a part of the 7th Infantry Division/Multi-Domain Command-Pacific. Its first commander is Col. Hugh W. A. Jones.

- 4th Multi-Domain Task Force, at Fort Carson (CO)
  - Headquarters and Headquarters Battalion
  - 4th Multi-Domain Effects Battalion
  - 1st Battalion, 10th Field Artillery Regiment (Long-Range Fires Battalion equipped with M142 HIMARS and Long-Range Hypersonic Weapon)
  - Indirect Fire Protection Capability Battalion (IFPC) (to be formed)
  - Task Force Sustainment Battalion (to be formed)

== See also ==
- 1st Multi-Domain Task Force
- 2nd Multi-Domain Task Force
- 3rd Multi-Domain Task Force
