= Multi-Domain Operations =

US Army's concept of operations

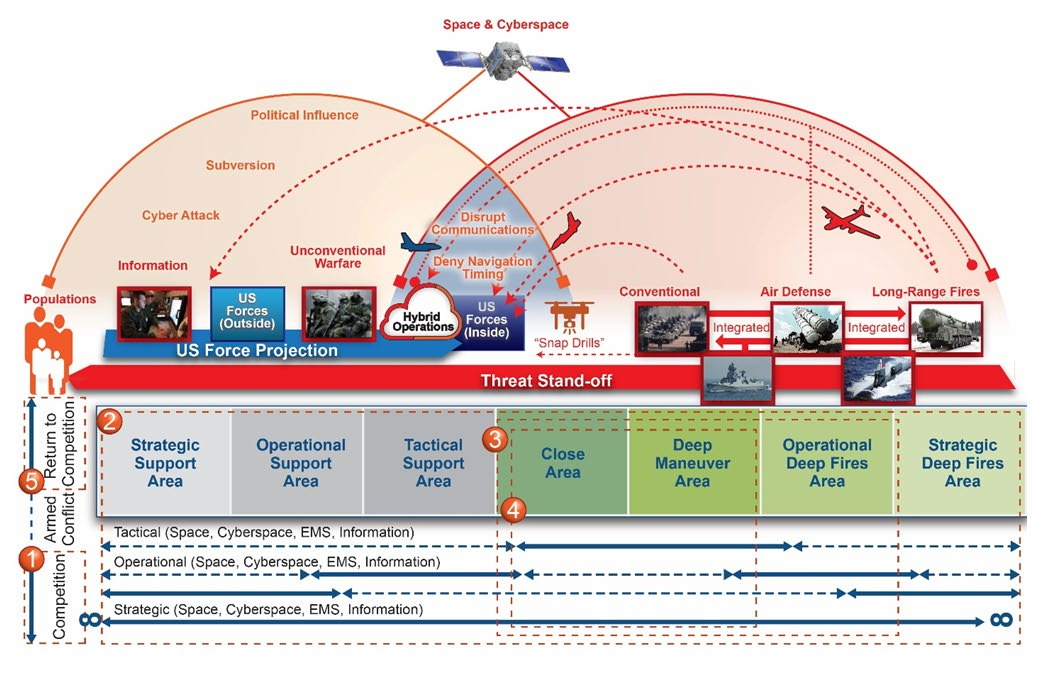
Multi-domain operations (MDO) span multiple domains: cislunar space, land, air, maritime, cyber, and populations.

Multi-Domain Operations (MDO) is the United States Army's and NATO's transformational concept of operations. It was created to reflect the 2018 National Defense Strategy, which shifted the previous focus of U.S. national security from countering violent extremists worldwide to confronting revisionist powers—primarily Russia and China. MDO's should not be confused with joint operations which promote coordination with other armed services, while MDOs go beyond that to include military and non-military assets. The concept goes by several different names including Multi-Domain Integration (MDI) (United Kingdom), Multi-Domain Maneuver (Israel), Multi-Domain Deterrence (Taiwan) and Multidimensionalität or Multidimensionality (Germany).

"Multi-Domain Operations are the combined arms employment of joint and Army capabilities to create and exploit relative advantages that achieve objectives, defeat enemy forces, and consolidate gains on behalf of joint force commanders. Employing Army and joint capabilities makes use of all available combat power from each domain to accomplish missions at least cost. Multi-Domain Operations are the Army’s contribution to joint campaigns, spanning the competition continuum," said the Army's Field Manual Operations of October 1, 2022.

== Multi-Domain Command (MDC) ==
In 2025, the Army created its first Multi-Domain Command in Europe with plans to create more in Japan, the Pacific and a geographically undesignated MDC-Army. The Army believed that it needed to create the MDCs to give them a higher level of command with a major general commander.

== Multi-Domain Task Force (MDTF) ==
The Army began with Multi-Domain Task Forces in 2017 with the 1st Multi-Domain Task Force (MDTF). It expanded to Multi-Domain Effects Battalions, Commands and Platoons. The Army hopes to have its fourth and fifth MDTFs established by 2028. NATO and U.S. Army multi-domain units are planned to operate in the land, maritime, air, space, cyberspace and electronic warfare domains in carrying out counter anti-access and area denial (A2/AD) operations. MDTFs are commanded by a colonel, equal to a brigade commander.

== Multi-Domain Effects Battalion (MDEB) ==
The MDEB's role is to use reconnaissance satellites, orbital sensors, unmanned aerial systems (UAS), and over-the-horizon radar to detect enemy movements, collect signals intelligence and military intelligence. Its goal is to disrupt enemy operations through electronic jamming, cyberattack, and psychological operations.

== Multi-Domain Effects Platoon (MDEP) ==
The MDEP is a designed to bring multi-domain effects to the brigade level. Its job would be rapid detection and destruction of threats in the electromagnetic spectrum (EMS), cyber, and physical domains. This unit allows existing brigades to add MDO capabilities to their arsenal. The DDEP would contain dismounted electronic warfare teams, mounted EW systems, aerial electronic warfare and sensors and long-range reconnaissance and loitering munitions.

== Israeli Defense Force ==
- Refaim Unit (Hebrew: יחידת רפאים, lit. 'Ghost Unit')

== Royal Air Force ==
- No. 11 Group RAF

== United States Army ==
As of May 2025, the U.S. Army plans to stand up four Multi-Domain Commands, starting with MDC-E.

- Multi Domain Command Europe (MDC-E)
  - 2nd Multi-Domain Task Force (2MDTF)
- Multi Domain Command Pacific
  - 1st Multi-Domain Task Force (1MDTF)
  - 3rd Multi-Domain Task Force (3MDTF)
- Multi Domain Command Japan
  - 4th Multi-Domain Task Force
- Multi Domain Command Army

== Countries Developing MDOs ==
- Denmark
- France
- Germany
- Pakistan
- Taiwan

== See also ==
- AirLand Battle
- China–United States relations
- Combined arms
- Full-spectrum dominance
- IDF
- NATO
- Russia–United States relations
