= Saeed Blacknall =

American football player (born 1996)

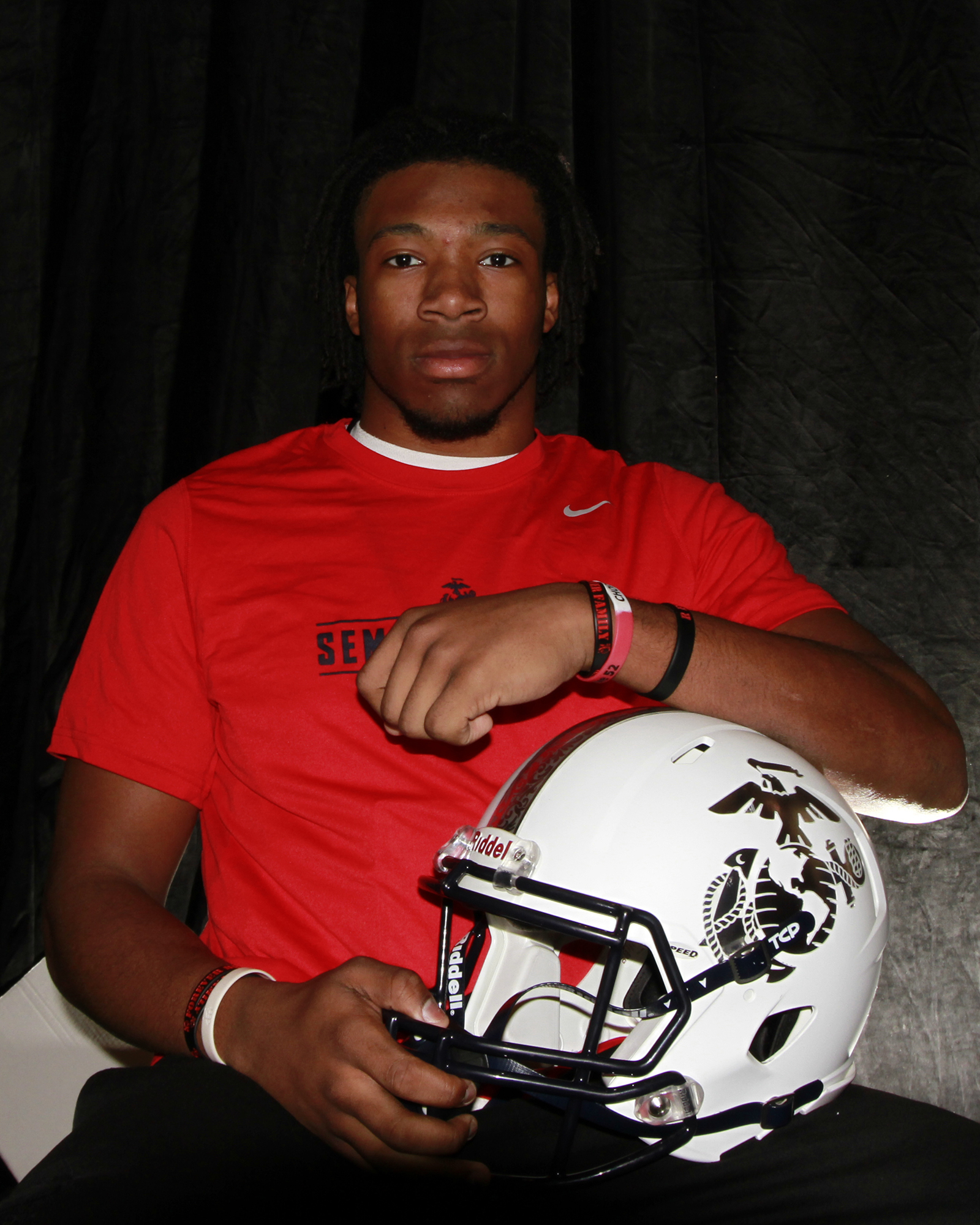
- Blacknall c. 2014

No. 80
- Position: Wide receiver

Personal information
- Born: March 17, 1996 (age 30); Long Branch, New Jersey, U.S.
- Listed height: 6 ft 2 in (1.88 m)
- Listed weight: 225 lb (102 kg)

Career information
- High school: Manalapan (Englishtown, New Jersey)
- College: Penn State
- NFL draft: 2018: undrafted

Career history
- Oakland Raiders (2018); Miami Dolphins (2019)*; Arizona Cardinals (2019)*; Los Angeles Wildcats (2020); Pittsburgh Steelers (2020)*; Vegas Vipers (2023)
- * Offseason or practice squad member only

Career NFL statistics
- Games played: 1
- Stats at Pro Football Reference

Saeed Raashad Blacknall (born March 17, 1996) is an American coach and former professional football player who was a wide receiver for the National Football League (NFL). He played college football for the Penn State Nittany Lions.

== Early life ==
Blacknall attended high school at Manalapan High School in Englishtown, New Jersey, where he also lettered in running track and field other than football accolades. While playing football at Manalapan he helped his team to a combined 32–5 record during final three seasons and compiled nearly 2,000 receiving yards and 35 touchdowns. During his senior year, he won the Central Jersey Group IV State Sectional Championship in the 55m dash competing on the school's indoor track & field team. Blacknall was selected to the "All-Americans – Junior All-Americans" and was named "Player of the Game" four times by MaxPreps.

Blacknall was ranked the fifth senior prospect of New Jersey by The Ledger 50 and was a Second Team All-State selection.

Blacknall was rated as a four-star recruit and committed to Penn State University to play college football. He originally committed to Rutgers before changing to Penn State.

During his high school career, Blacknall was named a two-time all-state selection, while earning first-team all-region, all-district and All-Shore Conference honors for three-straight years.

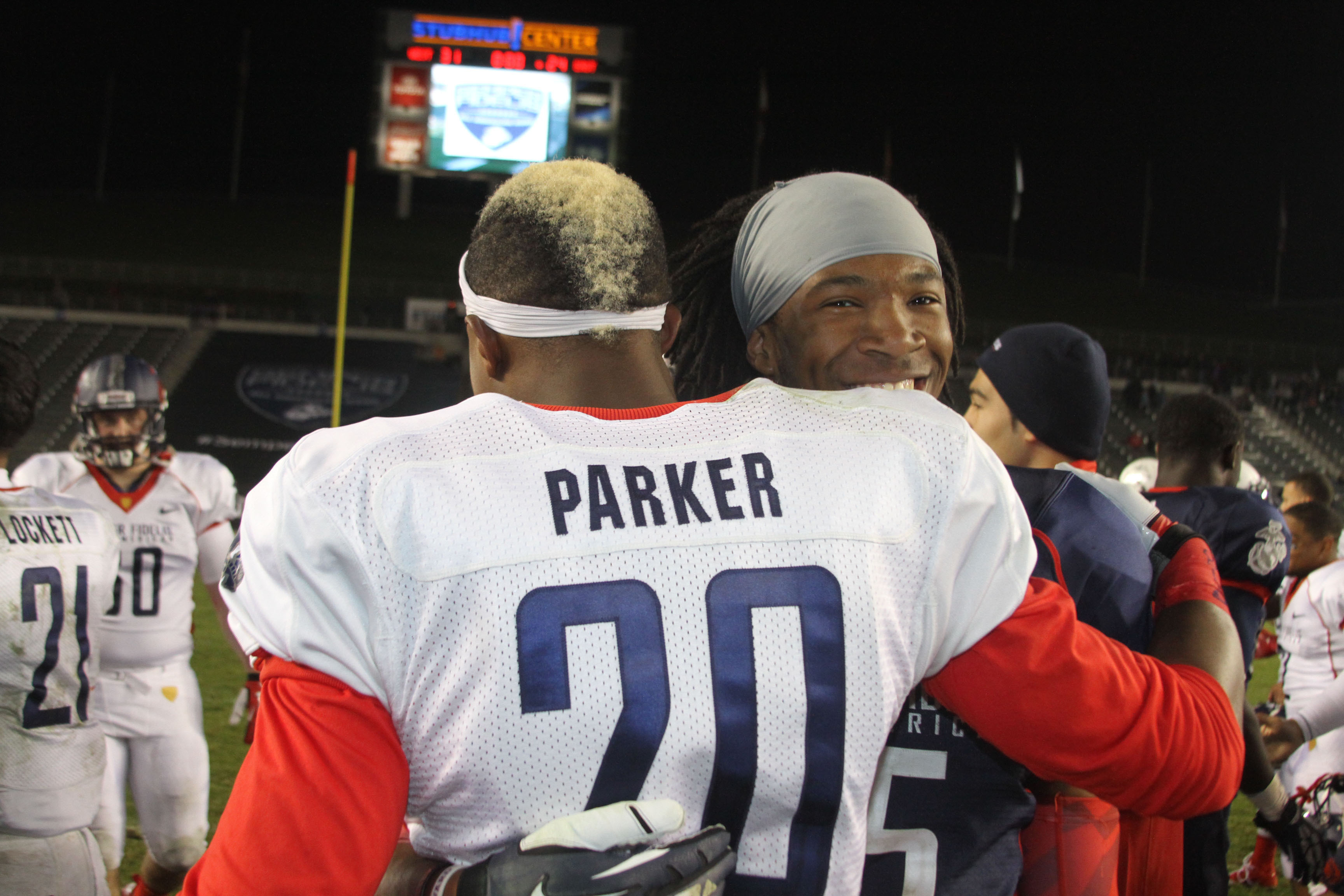
Blacknall congratulates Steven Parker at 2014 Semper Fidelis All-American Bowl

He was also selected to play in the Semper Fidelis All-American Bowl on January 5, 2014 and the USA U-19 All-American Game as a member of U.S. Under-19 National Team roster.

He was rated a four-star recruit by all four major recruiting services (ESPN, Rivals, Scout and 247Sports). ESPN.com, Scout.com and 247Sports.com ranked him among the top-150 recruits nationally. ESPN.com rated him a top-five recruit in New Jersey at (No. 3), Rivals.com (No. 4) and 247Sports.com (No. 3).

College recruiting
Name	Hometown	School	Height	Weight	40^{‡}	Commit date
Saeed Blacknall; WR	Long Branch, NJ	Manalapan HS	6 ft 2 in (1.88 m)	210 lb (95 kg)	4.39	Jan 26, 2014
Saeed Blacknall; WR	Recruit ratings: Scout: Rivals: 247Sports: (83)					
Overall recruit ranking:
‡ Refers to 40-yard dash; Note: In many cases, Scout, Rivals, 247Sports, On3, and ESPN may conflict in their listings of height, weight and 40 time.; In these cases, the average was taken. ESPN grades are on a 100-point scale.; Sources: "2014 Team Ranking". Rivals.com.

== College career ==
Blacknall played four seasons for the Nittany Lions, playing in 48 games and starting 15 games, under the guidance of James Franklin.

Blacknall appeared in the first four seasons (2014–2017) of Unrivaled: The Penn State Football Story, presented by Pepsi, a weekly 30-minute preview show that debuted on Thursday, August 28, two days before the Nittany Lions met UCF in the Croke Park Classic.

Preceded by Penn State Football 2013 – The Next Chapter, it aired on WPSU-TV including several other outlets and became nominated for several Mid-Atlantic Emmy Awards.

On January 8, 2020, Blacknall received an Honorable Mention as one of the top Penn State wide receivers of the 2010s decade on RoarLionsRoar.com.

=== Freshman season ===
As a freshman, he appeared in 13 games with one start. He scored 11 catches for 112 yards and one touchdown. He made his collegiate debut against UCF in only the fifth football game to be held in the Emerald Isle Classic (Croke Park Classic) at the Croke Park in Dublin, Ireland since its first game in 1988 during the 2014 NCAA Division I football season. He had his first career catch against UMass. He made his first-career start at Michigan Stadium against Michigan Wolverines where he had four catches. Penn State chipped the Buckeyes' lead to 17–14 early in the fourth quarter on a touchdown pass from Christian Hackenberg to Blacknall who scored a 24-yard touchdown against Ohio State Buckeyes. Also in 2014, Nittany Lions participated in the fifth annual Pinstripe Bowl against Boston Eagles at Yankee Stadium during the Non-CFP bowl games.

=== Sophomore season ===
As a sophomore, he played in 13 games with three starts. He gained eight catches for 248 yards and one touchdown. He totaled four catches for 101 yards against San Diego Aztecs on September 26 at Beaver Stadium where he hauled in a 46-yard pass. Blacknall gained a 25-yard touchdown reception again against Michigan Wolverines and recorded a 59-yard catch. As a sophomore, he spent time on the field as a running back and sometimes a safety.

=== Junior season ===
As a junior, Blacknall participated in 9 games with 7 starts and totaled 15 catches for a career-high 347 yards (23.1 avg.) with three touchdowns thus achieving six catches of 20-or-more yards. Blacknall had a 42-yard catch against the Purdue Boilermakers at Ross–Ade Stadium. He garnered a 19-yard TD pass while playing against the Iowa Hawkeyes. He caught a 43-yard pass against the Indiana Hoosiers on November 12 at Memorial Stadium. On December 3, 2016, the sixth annual Big Ten Championship Game took place. During the game, Blacknall set a record by gaining six receptions for 155 yards and two touchdowns in the 2016 Big Ten Football Championship Game against the Wisconsin Badgers at Lucas Oil Stadium and hauled in a 40-yard touchdown pass in the second quarter and a career-long 70-yard catch-and-run for a touch down in the third quarter. His yardage total broke the Big Ten Championship Game record and 70-yard catch became the third-longest in Big Ten Championship Game history. Blacknall held the receiving yards record for six years until it was broken by Charlie Jones at the 2022 Big Ten Football Championship Game by gaining 13 receptions on 16 targets for 162 yards. In August 2020, the 2016 game was listed as No. 1 by BlackShoeDiaries.com on its Best Penn State Football Games of the Last Decade list. As a junior, Blacknall racked up 1,359 all-purpose yards with 16 touchdowns. Blacknall was the Red Worrell award winner as the most improved player of the spring on offense.

=== Senior season ===
As a senior, he appeared in all 13 games with four starts and recorded a career-high 17 receptions for 289 yards and two touchdowns. He had three catches for 64 yards with a 35-yard TD reception against Georgia Panthers on September 16. He made his first start of the season and had an 18-yard reception against Indiana Hoosiers and scored four passes in one game with 74 yards against Northwestern Wildcats at Ryan Field, helping his team earn Pro Football Focus Big Ten Team of the Week honors. A 27-yard touchdown reception was recorded in a game against the Michigan State Spartans at Spartan Stadium. Blacknall made his first-career special teams tackle against Pittsburgh Panthers on September 9. As a senior, he totaled 52 receptions for 707 yards and 15 touchdowns. However, Blacknall didn't play at the 2017 Rose Bowl due to suspension for an undisclosed violation of team rules.

By the end of his college career, Blacknall had totaled 50 career receptions for 979 yards (19.6 avg.) with seven touchdowns. He had become a three-time Academic All-Big Ten selection. During his college career he had caught 40 passes for 743 yards, recorded 10 carries for 114 yards and returned kicks for 502 yards. Blacknall was awarded the Quarterback Club Award at the annual team banquet, the award for seniors whom deserve special recognition.

=== College statistics ===
Year	Team	GP	Receiving				Rushing				Scrimmage			
Year	Team	GP	Rec	Yds	Avg	TD	Att	Yds	Avg	TD	Plays	Yds	Avg	TD
2014	Penn State	6	10	95	9.5	1	1	−1	−1.0	0	11	94	8.5	1
2015	Penn State	5	8	248	31.0	1	0	0	0.0	0	8	248	31.0	1
2016	Penn State	7	15	347	23.1	3	0	0	0.0	0	15	347	23.1	3
2017	Penn State	12	17	289	17.0	2	0	0	0.0	0	17	289	17.0	2
Total		30	50	979	19.6	7	1	−1	−1.0	0	51	978	19.2	7

=== Awards and honors ===
- Croke Park Classic Champion — 2014
- Pinstripe Bowl Champion — 2014
- Big Ten Champion — 2016
- Fiesta Bowl Champion — 2017

== Professional career ==
Pre-draft measurables
Height	Weight	Arm length	Hand span	40-yard dash	20-yard shuttle	Vertical jump	Broad jump	Bench press
6 ft 2 in (1.88 m)	210 lb (95 kg)	33 3/8 in (0.85 m)	9 7/8 in (0.25 m)	4.39 s	4.15 s	32.5 in (0.83 m)	10 ft 7 in (3.23 m)	21 reps

=== Oakland Raiders ===
After going undrafted in the 2018 NFL draft, Blacknall signed with the Oakland Raiders as an undrafted free agent on May 4, 2018, along with Penn State teammate Jason Cabinda. He made a catch and sprinted up the sideline 21 yards against the Detroit Lions in the first week of the 2018 Raiders preseason. Thus making his pro debut. He scored a 45-yard touchdown in the fourth week during the preseason against the Seattle Seahawks at CenturyLink Field. He was waived on September 1, 2018, and was signed to the practice squad. He was promoted to the active roster on November 14, 2018. Blacknall made his regular season debut on November 18 against the Arizona Cardinals at State Farm Stadium, playing 16 snaps on offense while not being targeted any. He was waived on November 19, 2018, and re-signed to the practice squad. He signed a reserve/future contract with the Raiders on January 1, 2019. It was reported that Blacknall would appear in HBO's Hard Knocks, featuring the Oakland Raiders. Although, he was waived on July 18, 2019, before the 2019 season premiering on August 6.

=== Miami Dolphins ===
On July 19, 2019, Blacknall was claimed off waivers by the Miami Dolphins. He played in the first two games with the team during its 2019 preseason where he caught two passes for 39 yards. He was waived on August 20, 2019, with an injury designation. He was placed on injured reserve after clearing waivers the next day, then was waived with an injury settlement on August 25. The Green Bay Packers hosted Blacknall for a workout on September 16.

=== Arizona Cardinals ===
Blacknall was signed to the Arizona Cardinals practice squad on December 4, 2019. His practice squad contract with the team expired on January 6, 2020.

=== Los Angeles Wildcats ===
Blacknall was selected by the Los Angeles Wildcats in the 2020 XFL Supplemental Draft held on November 22, 2019. He signed with the team on January 6, 2020.

During the 2020 XFL season, Blacknall scored his first pro touchdown during a regular football season with a 42-yard touchdown with a pass from Josh Johnson on February 29 against New York Guardians during the second half of the game at MetLife Stadium. The game was broadcast on ABC and was seen by 1.5 million viewers. Blacknall scored a 17-yard touchdown with another pass from Josh Johnson on March 8 against Tampa Bay Vipers at Dignity Health Sports Park. He totaled four receptions for 120 yards and two touchdowns on 14 targets in three games during the season. He had his contract terminated when the league suspended operations on April 10, 2020.

=== Pittsburgh Steelers ===
On April 13, 2020, Blacknall signed with the Pittsburgh Steelers. He was waived on August 21, 2020. Blacknall had a tryout with the Carolina Panthers on August 23. He re-signed with the Steelers on August 28, 2020, but was waived again before the start of the regular season on September 5, 2020.

=== Vegas Vipers ===
In November 2022, Blacknall was selected in round ten as number seventy-six by the Vegas Vipers of the 2023 XFL draft held on November 16, 2022. He was drafted to the team for the 2023 XFL season. On February 9, 2023, Blacknall was one of nineteen players to get cut from the team before 2023 Vegas Vipers season kickoff. He was re-signed on March 30, 2023. The Vipers folded when the XFL and USFL merged to create the United Football League (UFL).

== Coaching career ==
In 2025, Blacknall became an assistant coach for Donovan Catholic High School's wide receivers. On May 21, 2026, it was announced on Notre Dame High School's instagram account for its football team that Blacknall left Donovan and become part of the team at Notre Dame.
