= Marcus Allen (linebacker) =

American football player (born 1996)

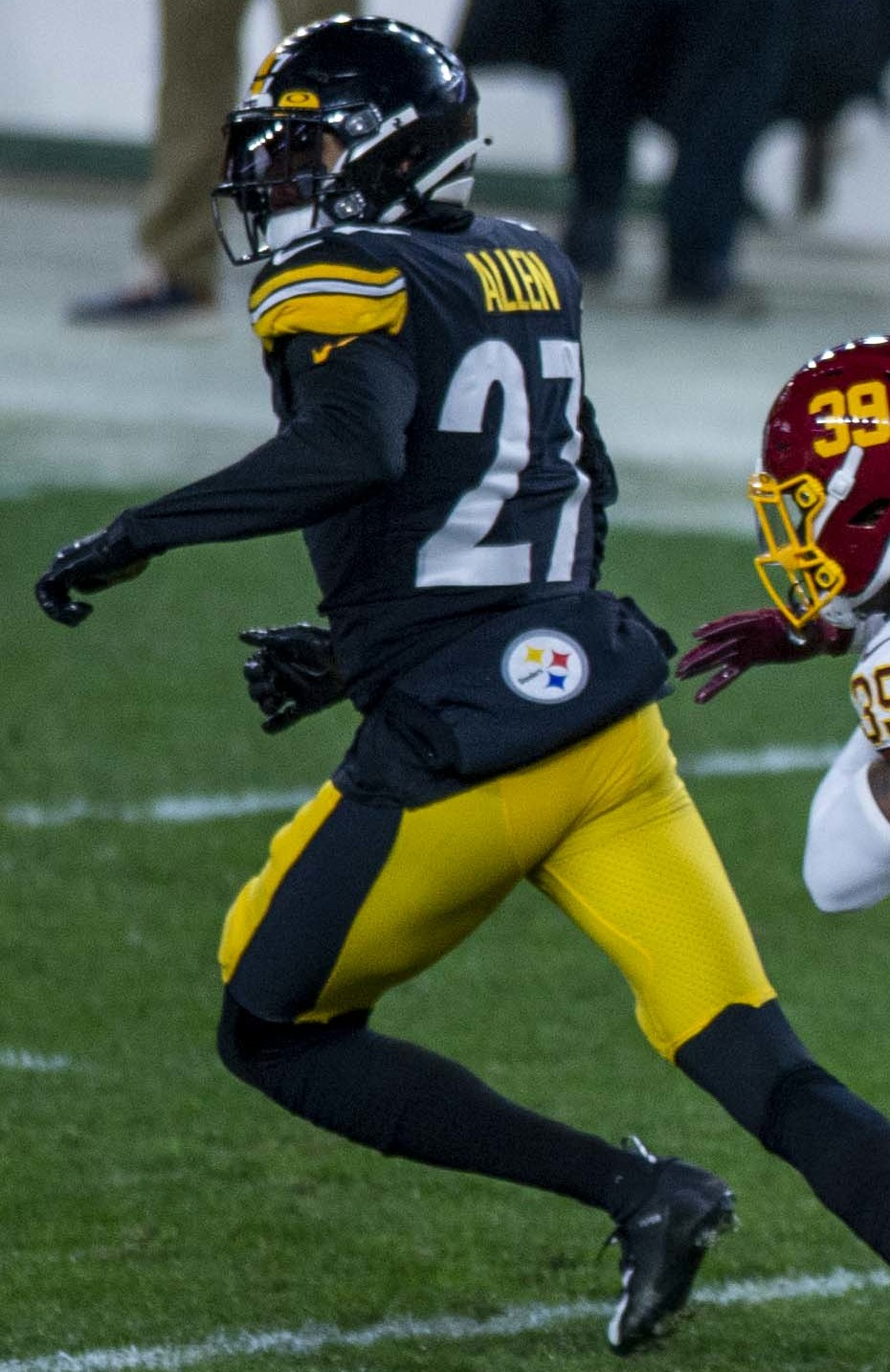
- Allen with the Pittsburgh Steelers in 2020

No. 27
- Position: Linebacker

Personal information
- Born: August 7, 1996 (age 30); Silver Spring, Maryland, U.S.
- Listed height: 6 ft 2 in (1.88 m)
- Listed weight: 215 lb (98 kg)

Career information
- High school: Dr. Henry A. Wise, Jr. (Upper Marlboro, Maryland)
- College: Penn State (2014–2017)
- NFL draft: 2018: 5th round, 148th overall pick

Career history
- Pittsburgh Steelers (2018–2022)

Awards and highlights
- First-team All-Big Ten (2017)

Career NFL statistics
- Total tackles: 57
- Stats at Pro Football Reference

Marcus Deshawn Allen (born August 7, 1996) is an American former professional football player who was a linebacker for the Pittsburgh Steelers of the National Football League (NFL). He played college football for the Penn State Nittany Lions.

== Early life ==
Allen attended Dr. Henry A. Wise Jr. High School in Upper Marlboro, Maryland, where he was a three-year letterman. He recorded just over 150 tackles and four interceptions over his four years in high school. He was rated a four-star recruit by Scout and 247Sports and a three-star prospect by ESPN and Rivals. He was ranked as a Top 30 prospect at safety nationally by Scout and 247Sports, and rated the No. 6 prep player in Maryland by 247Sports. He was named after All-Pro and Super Bowl champion running back Marcus Allen.

College recruiting
| Name | Hometown | School | Height | Weight | 40^{‡} | Commit date |
|---|---|---|---|---|---|---|
| Marcus Allen; S | Upper Marlboro, MD | Dr. Henry Wise HS | 6 ft 1 in (1.85 m) | 191 lb (87 kg) | N/A | Apr 10, 2013 |
| Marcus Allen; S | Recruit ratings: Scout: Rivals: 247Sports: (77) | | | | | |
Overall recruit ranking:
Note: In many cases, Scout, Rivals, 247Sports, On3, and ESPN may conflict in their listings of height and weight.; In these cases, the average was taken. ESPN grades are on a 100-point scale.; Sources: "2013 Team Ranking". Rivals.com.

== College career ==
Playing all 13 games, starting 7, Allen recorded a total of 58 tackles with one sack and two tackle for loss. During his sophomore season he ranked second on the team in tackles with 81 only behind Brandon Bell. Had six tackles and one forced fumble vs Georgia in the 2016 TaxSlayer Bowl. In his junior season he ranked No. 16 in the Big Ten Conference with 7.9 tackles per game. No. 3 in the Big Ten and tied for No. 30 in the Football Bowl Subdivision (FBS) with two fumble recoveries. The 22-tackle effort vs. Minnesota ranked No. 3 on the FBS single-game list in 2016 (24 - Obi Melifonwu, UConn & Rodney Butler, NMSU). In 2016, Allen also blocked the field goal that Grant Haley would return for a touchdown to upset No. 2 Ohio State, which became known as the Block Six.

=== College statistics ===
| Year | Team | Games | Tackles | | | Sacks/Yds | TFL/Yds | Fumbles | | Interceptions | | |
| Year | Team | Games | Solo | Asst | Tot | Sacks/Yds | TFL/Yds | FF | FR | Defl | Int | TD |
|---|---|---|---|---|---|---|---|---|---|---|---|---|
| 2014 | Penn State | 13 | 35 | 23 | 58 | 1/11 | 2/13 | 0 | 0 | 3 | 0 | 0 |
| 2015 | Penn State | 12 | 44 | 38 | 81 | 1/9 | 5/19 | 2 | 1 | 2 | 0 | 0 |
| 2016 | Penn State | 14 | 57 | 53 | 110 | 0/0 | 6/15 | 1 | 2 | 3 | 0 | 0 |
| 2017 | Penn State | 13 | 45 | 26 | 71 | 1/4 | 4/12 | 2 | 0 | 3 | 1 | 1 |
| Total | | 52 | 181 | 139 | 320 | 3/24 | 17/59 | 5 | 3 | 11 | 1 | 1 |

== Professional career ==
On November 10, 2017, it was announced that Allen had accepted his invitation to play in the 2018 Senior Bowl. On January 17, 2018, Allen played in the 2018 Reese's Senior Bowl as part of Denver Broncos' head coach Vance Joseph's North team that lost 45–16 to the South. Allen attended the NFL Scouting Combine in Indianapolis, Indiana, but opted to only perform the vertical jump, broad jump, bench press, and short shuttle. On March 20, 2018, he attended Penn State's pro day and completed the 40-yard dash, 20-yard dash, 10-yard dash, and three-cone drill. At the conclusion of the pre-draft process, Allen was projected to be a third or fourth-round pick by the majority of NFL draft experts and scouts. He was ranked the fourth best strong safety prospect in the draft by DraftScout.com.

External videos
- Marcus Allen's NFL Combine Workout

Pre-draft measurables
| Height | Weight | Arm length | Hand span | Wingspan | 40-yard dash | 10-yard split | 20-yard split | 20-yard shuttle | Three-cone drill | Vertical jump | Broad jump | Bench press |
|---|---|---|---|---|---|---|---|---|---|---|---|---|
| 6 ft 2 1/8 in (1.88 m) | 215 lb (98 kg) | 30 5/8 in (0.78 m) | 9 1/8 in (0.23 m) | 6 ft 2 in (1.88 m) | 4.63 s | 1.57 s | 2.67 s | 4.32 s | 7.13 s | 37 in (0.94 m) | 10 ft 7 in (3.23 m) | 15 reps |
All values from NFL Combine/Penn State's Pro Day

The Pittsburgh Steelers selected Allen in the fifth round (148th overall) of the 2018 NFL draft. Allen was the 15th safety drafted in 2018. On May 10, 2018, the Steelers signed Allen to a four-year, $2.75 million contract that includes a signing bonus of $292,637.

External videos
- Steelers draft Marcus Allen 148th overall

On August 31, 2019, Allen was waived by the Steelers and was signed to the practice squad the next day. On December 20, he was promoted to the active roster.

Allen was moved to linebacker for the 2020 season, and signed a one-year contract extension with the team on March 9, 2021.

On March 15, 2022, the Steelers placed an original-round restricted free agent tender on Allen. He was released during final roster cuts on August 30.
