= 2016 Big Ten Football Championship Game =

2016 Dr. Pepper Big Ten Football Championship Game
- Conference Championship
- Championship Game Logo
Wisconsin Badgers	Penn State Nittany Lions
(10–2)	(10–2)
31	38
Head coach: Paul Chryst	Head coach: James Franklin
AP / Coaches / CFP; 6 / 6 / 6	AP / Coaches / CFP; 8 / 8 / 7
	1	2	3	4	Total
Wisconsin	14	14	3	0	31
Penn State	7	7	14	10	38
- Date: December 3, 2016
- Season: 2016
- Stadium: Lucas Oil Stadium
- Location: Indianapolis, IN
- MVP: Trace McSorley (PSU)
- Favorite: Wisconsin by 3
- National anthem: Combined bands of both universities
- Referee: Mike Cannon
- Halftime show: Dr Pepper Tuition Giveaway
- Attendance: 65,018

United States TV coverage
- Network: Fox/Compass Media
- Announcers: Gus Johnson (Play-by-Play), Joel Klatt (Analyst), Shannon Spake (Sideline Reporter) (FOX); Gregg Daniels, Dale Hellestrae (Compass Media)
- Nielsen ratings: 5.3 (9.2 million viewers)

2016 Big Ten Conference football standings
	Conf.			Overall
Team	W		L	W		L
East Division
No. 7 Penn State xy$	8	–	1	11	–	3
No. 6 Ohio State x^	8	–	1	11	–	2
No. 10 Michigan	7	–	2	10	–	3
Indiana	4	–	5	6	–	7
Maryland	3	–	6	6	–	7
Michigan State	1	–	8	3	–	9
Rutgers	0	–	9	2	–	10
West Division
No. 9 Wisconsin xy	7	–	2	11	–	3
Iowa	6	–	3	8	–	5
Nebraska	6	–	3	9	–	4
Minnesota	5	–	4	9	–	4
Northwestern	5	–	4	7	–	6
Illinois	2	–	7	3	–	9
Purdue	1	–	8	3	–	9
Championship: Penn State 38, Wisconsin 31
^ – College Football Playoff participant; $ – Conference champion; x – Division champion/co-champions; y – Championship game participant; Rankings from AP Poll

The 2016 Big Ten Football Championship Game was played December 3, 2016 at Lucas Oil Stadium in Indianapolis, Indiana. It was the sixth annual Big Ten Football Championship Game to determine the 2016 champion of the Big Ten Conference.

The 2016 Big Ten Championship Game pitted the Wisconsin Badgers, champions of the West Division, who made its fourth appearance in six years in the conference title game, against the East Division champion Penn State Nittany Lions, who made their first-ever appearance in the conference championship game. Penn State and Ohio State had identical 8–1 conference records, but Penn State won the head-to-head tiebreaker over the Buckeyes.

== History ==
The 2016 Championship Game would be the sixth in the Big Ten's 121-year history, and the third to feature the conference's East and West division alignment. Last season, the Big Ten Championship Game featured the Michigan State Spartans, champions of the East Division, and the Iowa Hawkeyes, champions of the West Division. Iowa made its first appearance in the conference championship game, while Michigan State made its third appearance (L in 2011, W in 2013). Michigan State defeated Iowa 16–13 to win its second Big Ten Championship in three years.

=== Other ===
For the third time in the championship's history, ESPN's College GameDay was on site prior to the game.

=== Legacy ===
In August 2020, the game was listed as #1 by BlackShoeDiaries.com on its Best Penn State Football Games of the Last Decade list.

In May 2022, the game was listed as one of twelve games considered as Penn State's best by the website StateCollege.com on its 12 Seasons on the Beat (and Counting): The Top 12 Penn State Games list.

In June 2024, the game was listed as one of the top ten Nittany Lions wins of the last decade by Yahoo! Sports.

== Teams ==
=== Wisconsin Badgers ===
The Badgers started the season unranked, and opened vs the No. 5 LSU Tigers, whom they upset, 16–14, at Lambeau Field. The Badgers remained ranked the remainder of the season, peaking at No. 5 in both the AP (Week 12) and Coaches (Week 13) polls, and at No. 6 in the CFP rankings released on November 22 and November 29, 2016.

The Badgers went into the Championship game 10–2 (7–2 Big Ten), with both losses coming to Top 5 teams: No. 4 Michigan, who defeated Wisconsin 14–7; and No. 2 Ohio State, who defeated Wisconsin 30–23 in overtime.

=== Penn State Nittany Lions ===
The Nittany Lions started the season off 2–2 after losses to Pitt and No. 4 Michigan but finished the regular season on an 8-game winning streak as well as beating No. 2 Ohio State while averaging 35 points per game. They clinched the Big Ten East and a spot in the Big Ten Championship with a win and a Michigan loss to Ohio State. The Nittany Lions were led by sophomore duo quarterback Trace McSorley and 1,000+ yard rusher in Saquon Barkley and junior wide receiver Chris Godwin.

They finished the regular season 10–2 (8–1 Big Ten), a big improvement from the last two seasons under head coach James Franklin (finished 7–6 both seasons). Following Penn State's upset of No. 2 Ohio State, the Nittany Lions would be ranked No. 24 in the AP poll, their first appearance in the poll since December 4, 2011, where they were ranked No. 23 prior to their loss to No. 17 Houston in the TicketCity Bowl. The following week, following their 62–24 victory over Purdue, Penn State was ranked No. 23 in the Coaches poll, their first appearance in said poll since December 4, 2011. Furthermore, Penn State made its debut in the CFP's first ranking of the season on November 1, where they were placed at No. 12; throughout the remainder of the season, the Nittany Lions continued to climb, maxing out at No. 7/8 heading into the Big Ten Championship Game.

== Game summary ==
Scoring summary

Quarter	Time	Drive			Team	Scoring information	Score	
Quarter	Time	Plays	Yards	TOP	Team	Scoring information	Wisconsin	Penn State
1	5:27	14	81	8:00	Wisconsin	Austin Ramesh 1-yard touchdown run, Andrew Endicott kick good	7	0
1	3:06	2	72	0:45	Wisconsin	Corey Clement 67-yard touchdown run, Andrew Endicott kick good	14	0
1	1:10	5	75	1:56	Penn State	Mike Gesicki 33-yard touchdown reception from Trace McSorley, Tyler Davis kick good	14	7
2	9:42	--	--	--	Wisconsin	Fumble recovery returned 12 yards for touchdown by Ryan Connelly, Andrew Endicott kick good	21	7
2	5:15	5	42	2:31	Wisconsin	Dare Ogunbowale 7-yard touchdown run, Andrew Endicott kick good	28	7
2	0:58	8	90	1:27	Penn State	Saeed Blacknall 40-yard touchdown reception from Trace McSorley, Tyler Davis kick good	28	14
3	10:58	1	70	0:11	Penn State	Saeed Blacknall 70-yard touchdown reception from Trace McSorley, Tyler Davis kick good	28	21
3	4:22	8	63	3:17	Penn State	Saquon Barkley 1-yard touchdown run, Tyler Davis kick good	28	28
3	0:16	9	70	4:06	Wisconsin	23-yard field goal by Andrew Endicott	31	28
4	13:41	4	81	1:30	Penn State	Saquon Barkley 18-yard touchdown reception from Trace McSorley, Tyler Davis kick good	31	35
4	5:14	9	58	4:38	Penn State	24-yard field goal by Tyler Davis	31	38
"TOP" = time of possession. For other American football terms, see Glossary of American football.							31	38

=== Statistics ===
Statistics	WIS	PSU
First downs	22	21
Total offense yards	415	435
Rushes-yards (net)	241	51
Passing yards (net)	174	384
Passes, Comp-Att-Int	16–21–0	22–31–0
Time of Possession	36:57	23:03
Penalties	4–40	3–25
Turnovers	0	2

== See also ==
- List of Big Ten Conference football champions
