= Trace McSorley =

American football player (born 1995)

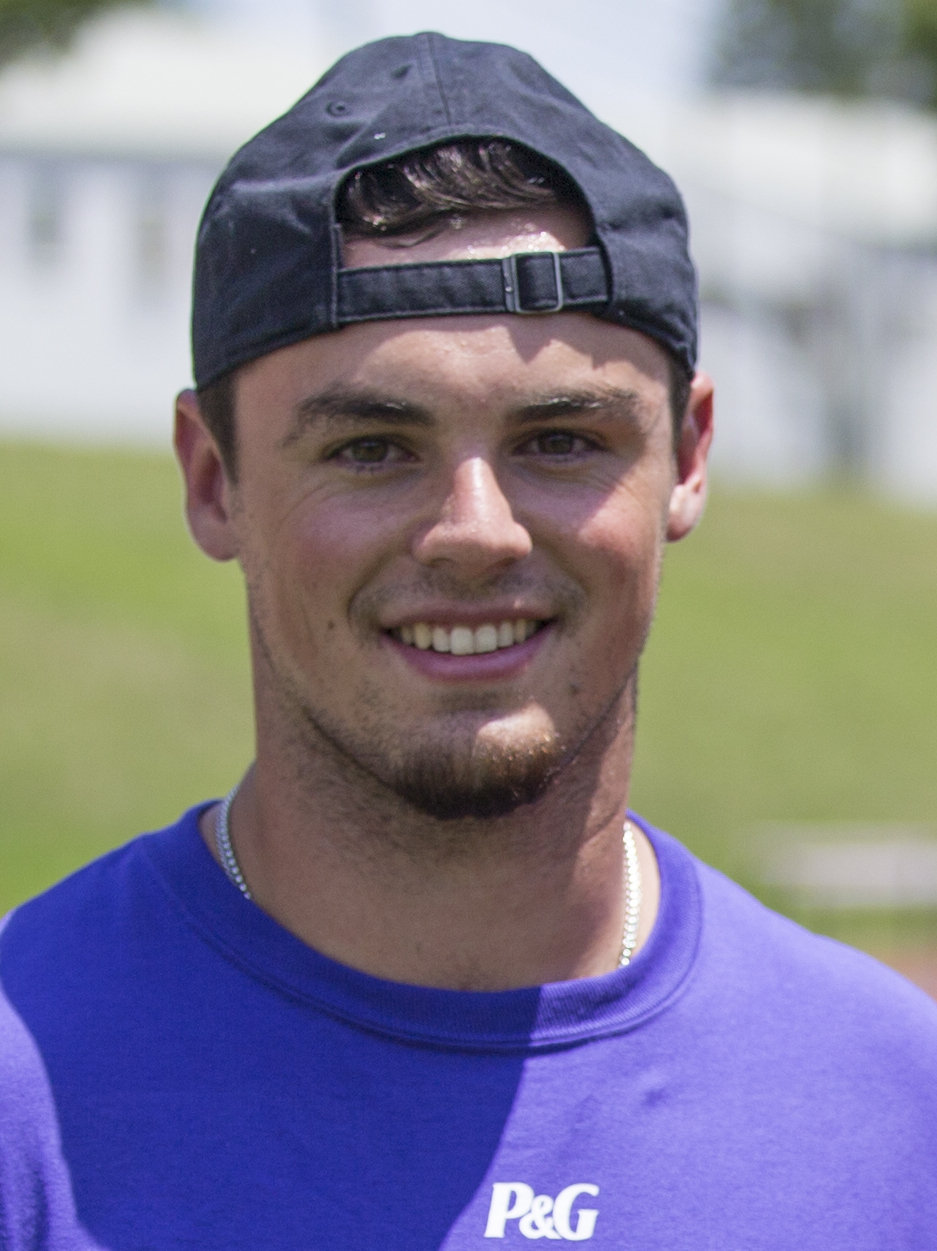
- McSorley in 2019

Buffalo Bills
- Title: Offensive assistant

Personal information
- Born: August 23, 1995 (age 31); Ashburn, Virginia, U.S.
- Listed height: 6 ft 0 in (1.83 m)
- Listed weight: 201 lb (91 kg)

Career information
- Position: Quarterback (No. 7, 19)
- High school: Briar Woods (Ashburn)
- College: Penn State (2014–2018)
- NFL draft: 2019: 6th round, 197th overall pick

Career history

Playing
- Baltimore Ravens (2019–2021); Arizona Cardinals (2021–2022); New England Patriots (2023)*; Chicago Bears (2023)*; Pittsburgh Steelers (2023)*; Washington Commanders (2024)*
- * Offseason or practice squad member only

Coaching
- Penn State (2025) Assistant quarterbacks coach; Buffalo Bills (2026–present) Offensive assistant

Awards and highlights
- 3× second-team All-Big Ten (2016–2018)

Career NFL statistics
- Passing attempts: 93
- Passing completions: 48
- Completion percentage: 51.6%
- TD–INT: 1–5
- Passing yards: 502
- Passer rating: 48.8
- Stats at Pro Football Reference

Richard Thomas "Trace" McSorley III (born August 23, 1995) is an American football coach and former professional football quarterback. He is currently an offensive assistant for the Buffalo Bills of the National Football League (NFL). He played college football for Penn State, where he holds school records in single-season passing yards, touchdowns, and career total yards. McSorley was drafted by the Baltimore Ravens in the sixth round of the 2019 NFL draft.

== Early life ==
McSorley attended Briar Woods High School in Ashburn, Virginia from 2010 to 2014. He played high school football and started as a freshman. In his freshman year, he led the team to a 13–2 record and a state championship. Two seasons later in his junior year, he led the team to a 15–0 record and its third consecutive state title. He was named First-team All-State by the Virginia Coaches Association and Virginia Preps. As a junior, he was awarded All-Dulles District First Team; Dulles District Offensive Player of the Year; and Second-team All-Region quarterback.

College recruiting
Name	Hometown	School	Height	Weight	40^{‡}	Commit date
Trace McSorley; QB	Ashburn, VA	Briar Woods HS	6 ft 1 in (1.85 m)	212 lb (96 kg)	4.53	Jan 20, 2014
Trace McSorley; QB	Recruit ratings: Scout: Rivals: 247Sports: (79)					
Overall recruit ranking:
‡ Refers to 40-yard dash; Note: In many cases, Scout, Rivals, 247Sports, On3, and ESPN may conflict in their listings of height, weight and 40 time.; In these cases, the average was taken. ESPN grades are on a 100-point scale.; Sources: "2014 Team Ranking". Rivals.com.

== College career ==
=== 2015 season ===
During McSorley's redshirt freshman year, he appeared in a total of six games, five of them when the game was in hand and McSorley was only in for a few plays. In the 2016 TaxSlayer Bowl against the Georgia Bulldogs, after starter Christian Hackenberg went out with an injury, McSorley was brought in with Penn State down 24–3. He nearly led a comeback, finishing the game 14 for 27 with 142 yards and two touchdowns, but Penn State fell short 24–17.

=== 2016 season ===
With the early departure of quarterback Christian Hackenberg, who was drafted in the 2016 NFL draft by the New York Jets, McSorley and redshirt freshman Tommy Stevens competed for the job. On McSorley's birthday, August 23, 2016, head coach James Franklin announced that McSorley would be the starter. In his first start on September 3, against the Kent State Golden Flashes, he went 16 of 31 for 209 yards and two touchdowns in a 33–13 win. In McSorley's second game, he threw for 332 yards and a score in the loss at Pitt. Later in the season when the Nittany Lions played Minnesota, McSorley put up career high yardage numbers when he threw for 335 yards in a 29–26 OT win.

On October 22, 2016, Penn State and McSorley played Big Ten rival Ohio State. McSorley struggled with accurately throwing the ball, completing 8 of 23 passes for 153 yards. However, he scored two touchdowns, one passing and one rushing, en route to a stunning upset of #2 Ohio State by unranked Penn State. The win gave PSU a #24 ranking in the AP Poll, PSU's first ranking in the top 25 since the 2011 season. The next week at Purdue, McSorley completed 12 of 23 passing for 228 yards, three touchdowns, and no interceptions. The Nittany Lions won in a 62–24 rout and cemented their place in the AP Top-25 with a #20 ranking.

On November 1, 2016, Penn State was named #12 in the first official College Football Playoff rankings of the season.

On November 26, against rival Michigan State, McSorley threw for a career-high 376 yards, four touchdowns and no interceptions. He went 17 of 23 with a completion percentage of 73%, and led Penn State to the 45–12 win, earning a berth to the Big Ten Championship game against Wisconsin. On November 30, 2016, McSorley was named Second Team All-Big Ten by the coaches and media. With a third quarter completion to DaeSean Hamilton, McSorley broke the Penn State single-season record for passing yards. The sophomore started the night fourth on the single-season list, but passed Christian Hackenberg, Daryll Clark and Matt McGloin’s to retain the top spot. McSorley finished the game with 384 yards, 22 of 31 passing, and four touchdowns in an MVP, Big Ten Championship winning performance.

"Trace has been dynamic all year long," head coach James Franklin said after the game. "I'm really proud of him, you know, his attitude, his demeanor, the type of teammate he is, the type of leader he is. Obviously he made plays tonight."

McSorley led the Nittany Lions back from a 28–7 deficit and broke the Big Ten Championship Game record for passing yards, set by Michigan State’s Connor Cook back in 2013, and touchdowns. His 364 total yards was also a championship game record.

On December 5, 2016, it was revealed that McSorley was on multiple Heisman ballots, some even as high as two, just behind Louisville quarterback Lamar Jackson. McSorley became the first Nittany Lion to be on a Heisman ballot in over ten years.

After the Big Ten Championship game, McSorley ranked third in FBS in passing yard on throws over 20 yards with 1,491.

In the 2017 Rose Bowl, McSorley went 18 for 29 with 254 yards and four touchdowns and three interceptions. He also rushed for 13 yards in a 49–52 loss to the USC Trojans.

=== 2017 season ===
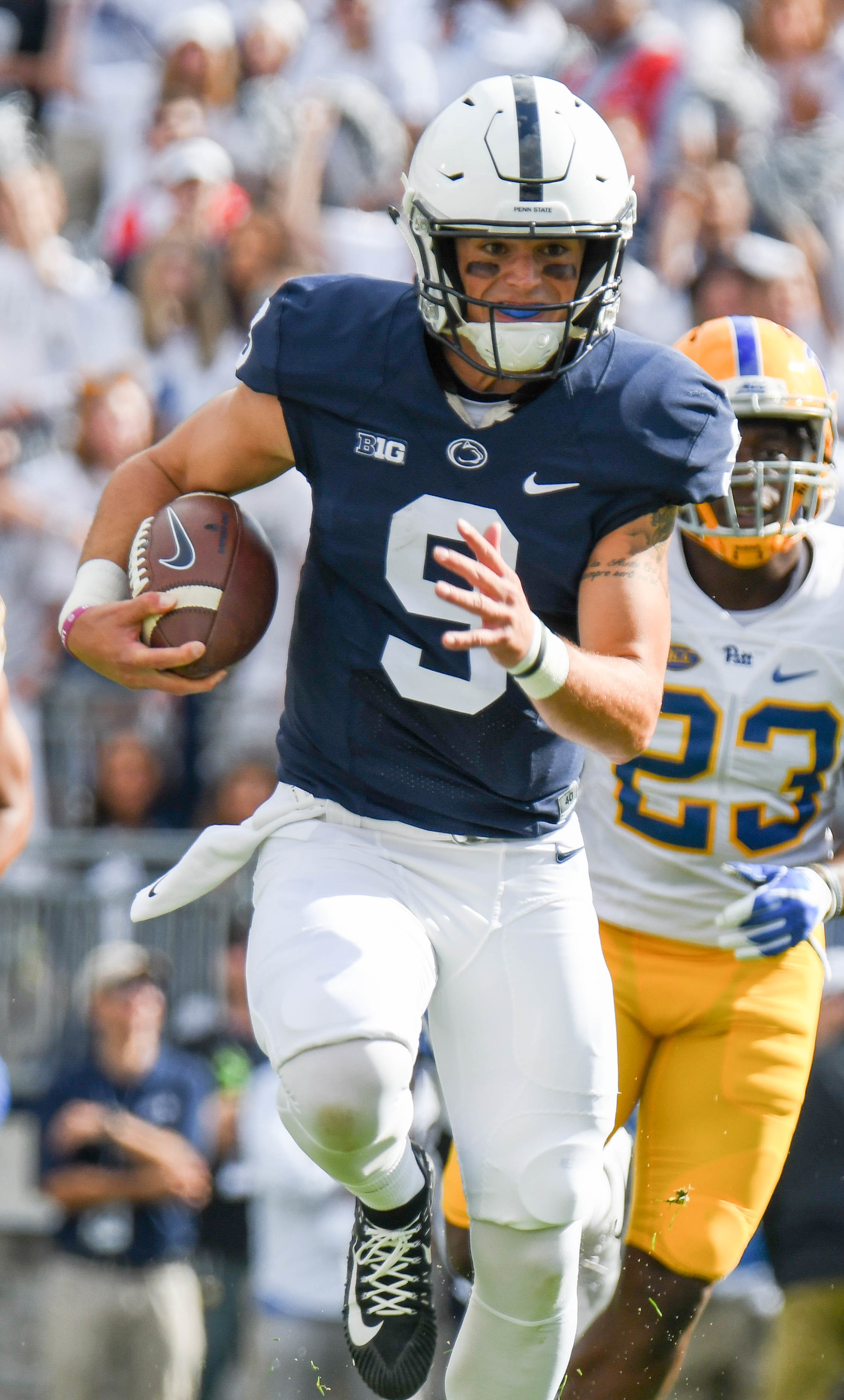
McSorley vs Pitt in 2017.

McSorley and the Nittany Lions entered the 2017 season ranked sixth by the AP Poll. In the Nittany Lions’ season opener McSorley passed for 280 yards and two touchdowns in a 52–0 rout over Akron. He helped lead the team to a remarkable 7–0 start (with a 3–0 mark in conference play), outscoring opponents by a combined 213 points over that span. Through the first seven games McSorley had passed for 1,879 yards and thrown 14 touchdown passes.

After a strong strong start, the Lions were ranked #2 in the country coming into a rivalry match at #6 Ohio State. In the primetime matchup, McSorley threw for 192 yards, two touchdowns and zero interceptions. He also rushed for 49 yards and another touchdown. However, a 19-point fourth quarter by the Buckeyes propelled them to a 39–38 comeback win, ending a potential perfect season for the Nittany Lions.

The next week against the Michigan State Spartans, McSorley threw for a season-high 381 yards and three touchdowns. However, after a 3 and a half hour delay due to weather the Nittany Lions were upset by the Spartans on a game winning field goal 27–24. The Nittany Lions and McSorley responded to the two-game losing streak however. The team finished the regular season 3–0 and McSorley threw for 776 yards and seven touchdowns with no interceptions in his final three contests.

The 10–2 Nittany Lions faced the 10–2 Washington Huskies in the 2017 Fiesta Bowl. McSorley struggled early and threw two interceptions in the first quarter however he finished the game 342 yards and two touchdown passes and also rushed for 60 yards. McSorley was named offensive MVP for the Nittany Lions.

After the season, it was speculated whether McSorley would declare for the 2018 NFL draft. After the bowl game, McSorley announced he was returning to Penn State for his senior season.

=== 2018 season ===
McSorley helped lead the Nittany Lions to a 4–0 start. In that stretch was a game against Kent State, where he passed for two touchdowns and ran for three touchdowns. In the next game, a 27–26 loss to Ohio State, he had 286 passing yards, two passing touchdowns, and 25 carries for 175 rushing yards. After a loss to Michigan State in the next game, he had 220 passing yards, 107 rushing yards, and two rushing touchdowns in a victory over Indiana. After a victory over Iowa and a loss to Michigan, he helped lead the Nittany Lions to three consecutive wins over Wisconsin, Rutgers, and Maryland to close out the regular season. The Nittany Lions qualified for the Citrus Bowl, where they lost 27–24 to Kentucky. McSorley finished his final season with 2,530 passing yards, 18 passing touchdowns, and seven interceptions to go with 798 rushing yards and 12 rushing touchdowns.

== Professional playing career ==
=== Pre-draft ===
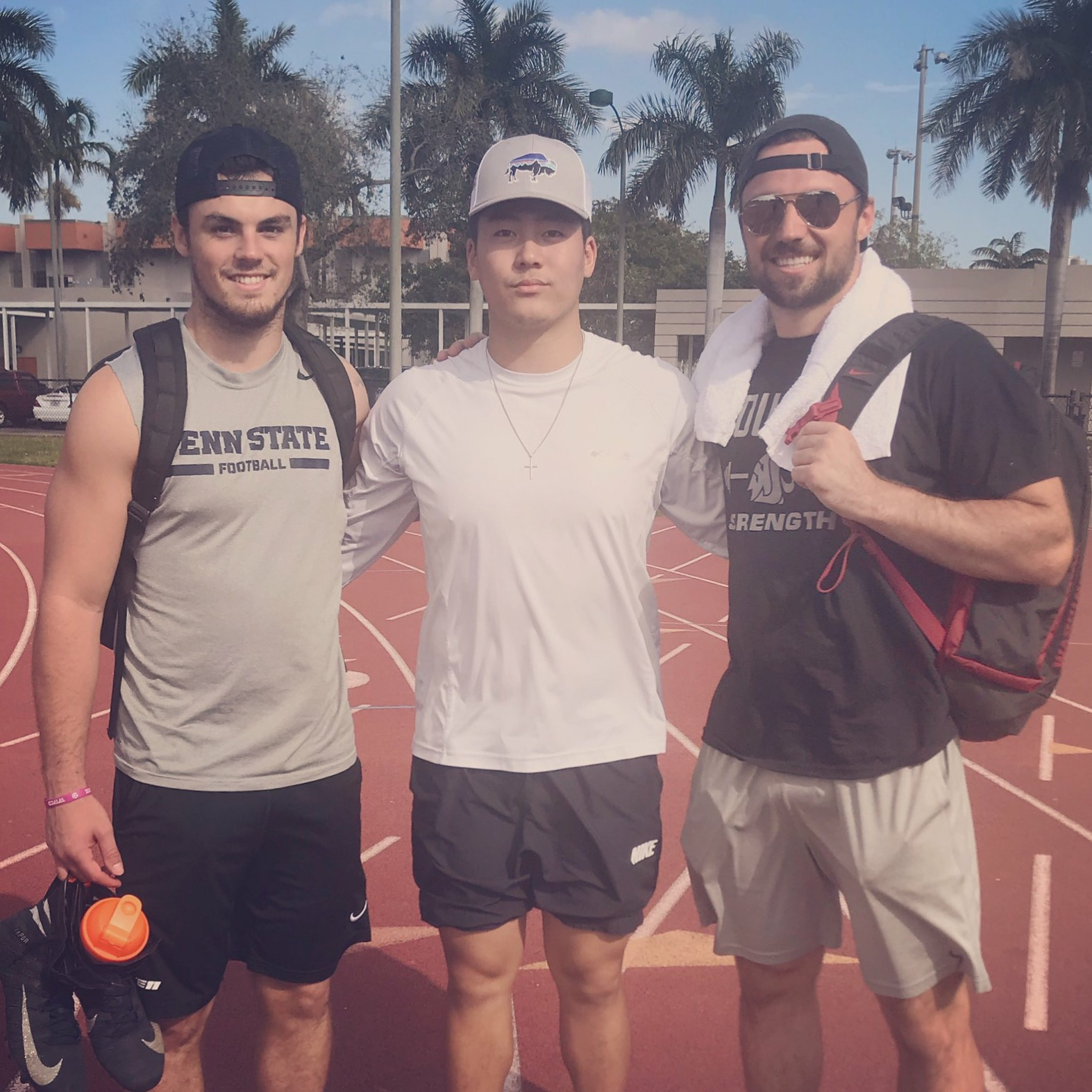
McSorley (left) with Gardner Minshew (right) in 2018

McSorley was automatically eligible for the 2019 NFL draft as he was a graduating senior.

At the NFL Scouting Combine, McSorley posted a quarterback-best 4.57-second 40-yard dash, a vertical jump of 33 inches, as well as a 115-inch broad jump. NFL insider Adam Schefter reported that some teams asked McSorley to perform workouts with defensive backs, which he declined.

Pre-draft measurables
Height	Weight	Arm length	Hand span	Wingspan	40-yard dash	10-yard split	20-yard split	20-yard shuttle	Three-cone drill	Vertical jump	Broad jump	Wonderlic
6 ft 0 1/8 in (1.83 m)	202 lb (92 kg)	31 in (0.79 m)	9 1/8 in (0.23 m)	6 ft 0 3/8 in (1.84 m)	4.57 s	1.53 s	2.68 s	4.12 s	7.09 s	33.0 in (0.84 m)	9 ft 7 in (2.92 m)	31
All values from NFL Combine

=== Baltimore Ravens ===
==== 2019 season ====
McSorley was drafted by the Baltimore Ravens in the sixth round with the 197th overall pick in the 2019 NFL draft.

McSorley was the third-string quarterback behind Lamar Jackson and Robert Griffin III and made his debut in Week 17 of the 2019 season against the Pittsburgh Steelers. His sole snap was a quarterback draw which went for one yard. The Ravens won 28–10.

==== 2020 season ====
McSorley remained the third-string quarterback heading into the 2020 season. He was placed on the reserve/COVID-19 list by the team on November 20, 2020, and activated on December 1. On December 2, 2020, McSorley came in during the fourth quarter of a rare Wednesday afternoon game against the Steelers after backup Griffin left the game with a hamstring injury. McSorley completed two out of six attempts for 77 yards and his first career touchdown, which was a 70-yard pass to Marquise Brown. He also carried the ball three times for 16 yards, including a seven-yard run for a fourth-down conversion. However, the Ravens lost 19–14. McSorley played two games later against the Cleveland Browns when starting quarterback Lamar Jackson suffered cramps and was pulled from the game in the third quarter. McSorley completed one of four passes for 13 yards and rushed twice for one yard. However, he suffered a left knee sprain on a quarterback draw and had to be pulled from the game in favor of a recovered Jackson. The Ravens came back and won the game 47–42. McSorley was placed on injured reserve the following day, causing him to miss the remainder of the regular season.

==== 2021 season ====
On August 31, 2021, McSorley was waived by the Ravens; however, he was re-signed to the practice squad the next day. On November 20, 2021, McSorley was activated to the Ravens' active roster, as Jackson was unable to play due to an illness, and backup quarterback Tyler Huntley had to act as the starter.

=== Arizona Cardinals ===
==== 2021 season ====
On November 22, 2021, McSorley was signed off the Ravens practice squad by the Arizona Cardinals.

==== 2022 season ====
On August 30, 2022, McSorley was waived by the Cardinals and signed to the practice squad the next day. On September 7, he was promoted to the active roster. On December 21, after starter Kyler Murray tore his ACL in Week 14 and backup Colt McCoy suffered a head injury against the Denver Broncos in Week 15, McSorley was named the starter for the Cardinals in Week 16 matchup against the Tampa Bay Buccaneers. Passing 24-for-45 with one interception, McSorley netted 217 yards in the Cardinals' 19-16 loss in overtime. Prior to the Week 17 match-up against the Atlanta Falcons he was benched in favor of David Blough.

=== New England Patriots ===
On April 13, 2023, McSorley signed a one-year deal with the New England Patriots. He was released by New England on August 28.

=== Chicago Bears ===
On October 17, 2023, the Chicago Bears signed McSorley to their practice squad. He was released on November 21.

=== Pittsburgh Steelers ===
On December 4, 2023, the Pittsburgh Steelers signed McSorley to their practice squad. He was released on January 10, 2024.

=== Washington Commanders ===
On August 14, 2024, McSorley signed with the Washington Commanders. He was released by the Commanders on August 27.

== Career statistics ==
=== NFL ===
Year	Team	Games			Passing								Rushing				Sacks		Fumbles	
Year	Team	GP	GS	Record	Cmp	Att	Pct	Yds	Avg	TD	Int	Rtg	Att	Yds	Avg	TD	Sck	SckY	Fum	Lost
2019	BAL	1	0	—	0	0	0.0	0	0.0	0	0	0.0	1	1	1.0	0	0	0	0	0
2020	BAL	2	0	—	3	10	30.0	90	9.0	1	0	97.9	5	17	3.4	0	0	0	0	0
2021	ARI	0	0	—	DNP															
2022	ARI	6	1	0–1	45	83	54.2	412	5.0	0	5	42.8	15	61	4.1	0	3	27	2	2
Career		9	1	0–1	48	93	51.6	502	5.4	1	5	48.8	21	79	3.8	0	3	27	2	2

=== College ===
Year	Team	Games			Passing									Rushing				
Year	Team	GP	GS	Record	Cmp	Att	Pct	Yds	Avg	Lng	TD	Int	Rtg	Att	Yds	Avg	Lng	TD
2014	Penn State	0	0	—	Redshirted													
2015	Penn State	6	0	—	20	40	50.0	185	9.3	21	2	0	105.4	13	43	3.3	14	0
2016	Penn State	14	14	11–3	224	387	57.9	3,614	16.1	80	30	8	156.6	146	365	2.5	26	7
2017	Penn State	13	13	11–2	284	427	66.5	3,570	12.6	85	28	10	162.4	144	491	3.4	36	11
2018	Penn State	13	13	9–4	192	361	53.2	2,530	13.2	93	18	7	124.6	170	798	4.7	51	12
Career		46	40	31–9	720	1,215	59.3	9,899	13.7	93	77	25	144.5	473	1,697	3.6	51	30

== Career highlights ==
=== Awards and honors ===
- Fiesta Bowl Champion – 2017
- Fiesta Bowl Offensive MVP – 2017
- Big Ten Champion – 2016
- Big Ten Championship game MVP – 2016
- Second team All-Big Ten – 2016, 2017

=== Penn State records ===
- Most single-season passing yards – 3,360 yds (as of December 2016)
- Most single-season total yards – 3979 yds (as of December 2016)
- Most single-season passing touchdowns – 29 (as of December 2016)
  - Most single-season 300-yard passing games – 5 (as of December 2016)
- Most consecutive games with touchdown pass – 27
- Most total offensive yards in a single game – 461 (as of September 2018)

== Coaching career ==
=== Penn State ===
On February 26, 2025, McSorley returned to Penn State as an assistant quarterbacks coach on Franklin's staff.

=== Buffalo Bills ===
On February 26, 2026, McSorley was hired by the Buffalo Bills to serve as an offensive assistant under new head coach Joe Brady, who he had previously worked with while Brady was a graduate assistant at Penn State in 2015 and 2016.

== Personal life ==
Trace is the son of Rick and Andrea McSorley, and he has one younger sister, Micaela. His father played football at the University of Richmond and an uncle, Jeff McSorley, played football at Marshall University. He enjoys playing organized and pick-up sports and video games. McSorley graduated from Penn State in May 2018 with a degree in accounting and is working on a second degree in journalism. In October 2020, McSorley was the subject of a viral trend on the app TikTok. The song featured in the video, Trace McSorley by Matty Fresh, was originally uploaded in August 2018.

McSorley is a Christian. McSorley has a tattoo on his left biceps consisting of a cross with the Bible verses Philippians 4:13 and Psalms 23:4. He has said that the message behind the tattoo is "always pulling me in the right direction" and keeps him grounded and true to his roots.

He married Kasey Morano, his longtime girlfriend whom he met at Penn State, on March 25, 2023, in Philadelphia.
