= 2016 Penn State Nittany Lions football team =

American college football season

2016 Penn State Nittany Lions football

Big Ten champion Big Ten East Division co-champion Lambert-Meadowlands Trophy

Big Ten Championship Game, W 38–31 vs. Wisconsin

Rose Bowl, L 49–52 vs. USC
- Conference: Big Ten Conference
- East Division

Ranking
- Coaches: No. 7
- AP: No. 7
- Record: 11–3 (8–1 Big Ten)
- Head coach: James Franklin (3rd season)
- Offensive coordinator: Joe Moorhead (1st season)
- Offensive scheme: Spread
- Defensive coordinator: Brent Pry (1st season)
- Co-defensive coordinator: Tim Banks (1st season)
- Base defense: 4–3
- Captains: Brandon Bell; Brian Gaia; Von Walker
- Home stadium: Beaver Stadium

2016 Big Ten Conference football standings
	Conf.			Overall
Team	W		L	W		L
East Division
No. 7 Penn State xy$	8	–	1	11	–	3
No. 6 Ohio State x^	8	–	1	11	–	2
No. 10 Michigan	7	–	2	10	–	3
Indiana	4	–	5	6	–	7
Maryland	3	–	6	6	–	7
Michigan State	1	–	8	3	–	9
Rutgers	0	–	9	2	–	10
West Division
No. 9 Wisconsin xy	7	–	2	11	–	3
Iowa	6	–	3	8	–	5
Nebraska	6	–	3	9	–	4
Minnesota	5	–	4	9	–	4
Northwestern	5	–	4	7	–	6
Illinois	2	–	7	3	–	9
Purdue	1	–	8	3	–	9
Championship: Penn State 38, Wisconsin 31
^ – College Football Playoff participant; $ – Conference champion; x – Division champion/co-champions; y – Championship game participant; Rankings from AP Poll

The 2016 Penn State Nittany Lions football team represented Pennsylvania State University in the 2016 NCAA Division I FBS football season. The team was led by third-year head coach James Franklin and played its home games in Beaver Stadium in University Park, Pennsylvania. They were a member of the Big Ten East Division of the Big Ten Conference. They lost to Pitt and Michigan in early September but then had a winning streak that included signature victories over Ohio State and Wisconsin en route to a Big Ten championship. Despite their Big Ten title, the Nittany Lions just missed a playoff berth. They represented the Big Ten in the 2017 Rose Bowl, losing to USC on a last-second game winning field goal.

== Schedule ==
Penn State announced its 2016 football schedule on July 11, 2013. The 2016 schedule consisted of seven home and five away games in the regular season. The Nittany Lions hosted Big Ten foes Iowa, Maryland, Michigan State, Minnesota, and Ohio State, and traveled to Indiana, Michigan, Purdue, and Rutgers.

The team hosted two of the three non-conference games against the Kent State Golden Flashes from the Mid-American Conference (MAC), Pittsburgh Panthers from the Atlantic Coast Conference (ACC), and the Temple Owls from the American Athletic Conference (AAC).

Date	Time	Opponent	Rank	Site	TV	Result	Attendance
September 3	3:30 p.m.	Kent State*		Beaver Stadium; University Park, PA	BTN	W 33–13	94,378
September 10	12:00 p.m.	at Pittsburgh*		Heinz Field; Pittsburgh, PA (rivalry)	ESPN	L 39–42	69,983
September 17	12:00 p.m.	Temple*		Beaver Stadium; University Park, PA	BTN	W 34–27	100,420
September 24	3:30 p.m.	at No. 4 Michigan		Michigan Stadium; Ann Arbor, MI (rivalry)	ABC	L 10–49	110,319
October 1	3:30 p.m.	Minnesota		Beaver Stadium; University Park, PA (Governor's Victory Bell)	BTN	W 29–26 ^{OT}	95,332
October 8	12:00 p.m.	Maryland^{†}		Beaver Stadium; University Park, PA (rivalry)	BTN	W 38–14	100,778
October 22	8:00 p.m.	No. 2 Ohio State		Beaver Stadium; University Park, PA (rivalry)	ABC	W 24–21	107,280
October 29	12:00 p.m.	at Purdue	No. 24	Ross–Ade Stadium; West Lafayette, IN	ABC/ESPN2	W 62–24	33,157
November 5	7:30 p.m.	Iowa	No. 12	Beaver Stadium; University Park, PA	BTN	W 41–14	106,194
November 12	12:00 p.m.	at Indiana	No. 10	Memorial Stadium; Bloomington, IN	ABC/ESPN2	W 45–31	40,678
November 19	8:00 p.m.	at Rutgers	No. 8	High Point Solutions Stadium; Piscataway, NJ	BTN	W 39–0	51,366
November 26	3:30 p.m.	Michigan State	No. 7	Beaver Stadium; University Park, PA (rivalry)	ESPN	W 45–12	97,418
December 3	8:00 p.m.	vs. No. 6 Wisconsin	No. 7	Lucas Oil Stadium; Indianapolis, IN (Big Ten Championship Game, College GameDay)	FOX	W 38–31	65,018
January 2, 2017	5:00 p.m.	vs. No. 9 USC*	No. 5	Rose Bowl; Pasadena, CA (Rose Bowl, College GameDay)	ESPN	L 49–52	95,128
*Non-conference game; ^{†}Homecoming; Rankings from AP Poll and CFP Rankings after November 1 released prior to game; All times are in Eastern time

== Rankings ==
Ranking movements Legend: ██ Increase in ranking ██ Decrease in ranking — = Not ranked RV = Received votes
	Week															
Poll	Pre	1	2	3	4	5	6	7	8	9	10	11	12	13	14	Final
AP	—	—	—	—	—	—	—	—	24	20	12	9	8	8	5	7
Coaches	—	—	—	—	—	—	RV	—	RV	23	14	10	8	8	5	7
CFP	Not released									12	10	8	7	7	5	Not released

== Game summaries ==
=== Kent State ===
Kent State vs. Penn State – Game summary

Quarter	1	2	3	4	Total
Kent State	3	10	0	0	13
Penn State	6	10	10	7	33

at Beaver Stadium • University Park, Pennsylvania

- Date: September 3
- Game time: 3:30 p.m. EDT
- Game weather: 77 °F (25 °C); sunny and clear
- Game attendance: 94,378
- Referee: Greg Blum
- TV announcers (BTN): Scott Graham, Chuck Long
- ESPN Box Score, GoPSUsports.com

Game information

First quarter

- KSU – Shane Hynes, 26-yard field goal, 5:25 (KSU 3–0)
- PSU – DaeSean Hamilton, 4-yard TD pass from Trace McSorley, 2-point conversion failed, 1:56 (PSU 6–3)

Second quarter

- KSU – Hynes, 43-yard field goal, 11:33 (TIE 6–6)
- PSU – Saquon Barkley, 7-yard TD run, Tyler Davis kick good, 8:02 (PSU 13–6)
- KSU – Elcee Refuge, 20-yard fumble recovery for TD, Hynes kick good, 6:12 (TIE 13–13)
- PSU – Davis, 29-yard field goal, 1:47 (PSU 16–13)

Third quarter

- PSU – Amani Oruwariye, 30-yard interception return for TD, Davis kick good, 14:05 (PSU 23–13)
- PSU – Davis, 28-yard field goal, 4:22 (PSU 26–13)

Fourth quarter

- PSU – Mike Gesicki, 30-yard TD pass from McSorley, Davis kick good, 1:53 (PSU 33–13)

Top passers

- KSU – Mylik Mitchell – 6/12, 65 yards
- KSU – Justin Agner – 8/15, 64 yards
- PSU – Trace McSorley – 16/31, 209 yards, 2 TD

Top rushers

- KSU – Justin Rankin – 13 carries, 82 yards
- PSU – Saquon Barkley – 22 carries, 105 yards, TD

Top receivers

- KSU – Nick Holley – 4 receptions, 45 yards
- PSU – Chris Godwin – 7 receptions, 67 yards

Top defenders

- KSU – Nate Holley – 17 tackles, 1 tackle-for-loss (TFL)
- PSU – Jason Cabinda – 11 tackles

=== Pittsburgh ===
Penn State vs. Pittsburgh – Game summary

Quarter	1	2	3	4	Total
Penn State	7	7	7	18	39
Pittsburgh	14	14	7	7	42

at Heinz Field • Pittsburgh, Pennsylvania

- Date: September 10
- Game time: 12:00 p.m. EDT
- Game weather: 85 °F (29 °C); partly cloudy
- Game attendance: 69,983
- Referee: Jerry McGinn
- TV announcers (ESPN): Bob Wischusen, Brock Huard, Allison Williams
- ESPN Box Score, GoPSUsports.com

Game information

First quarter

- UP – George Aston, 1-yard TD run, Chris Blewitt kick good, 8:03 (UP 7–0)
- UP – Quadree Henderson, 7-yard TD pass from Nathan Peterman, Blewitt kick good, 7:16 (UP 14–0)
- PSU – Saquon Barkley, 3-yard TD run, Tyler Davis kick good, 2:42 (UP 14–7)

Second quarter

- UP – Scott Orndoff, 2-yard TD pass from Peterman, Blewitt kick good, 13:38 (UP 21–7)
- UP – Aston, 3-yard TD run, Blewitt kick good, 11:54 (UP 28–7)
- PSU – Barkley, 1-yard TD run, Davis kick good, 0:42 (UP 28–14)

Third quarter

- PSU – Barkley, 40-yard TD pass from Trace McSorley, Davis kick good, 11:54 (UP 28–21)
- UP – James Conner, 1-yard TD run, Blewitt kick good, 7:24 (UP 35–21)

Fourth quarter

- PSU – Barkley, 1-yard TD run, Davis kick good, 13:42 (UP 35–28)
- PSU – Davis, 38-yard field goal, 12:04 (UP 35–31)
- UP – Conner, 12-yard TD pass from Peterman, Blewitt kick good, 10:24 (UP 42–31)
- PSU – Barkley, 2-yard TD run, DaeSean Hamilton pass from McSorley for 2-point conversion, 5:00 (UP 42–39)

Top passers

- PSU – Trace McSorley – 24/35, 332 yards, TD, INT
- UP – Nathan Peterman – 11/15, 91 yards, 3 TD, INT

Top rushers

- PSU – Saquon Barkley – 20 carries, 85 yards, 4 TD
- UP – James Conner – 22 carries, 117 yards, TD

Top receivers

- PSU – DaeSean Hamilton – 8 receptions, 82 yards
- UP – Conner – 4 receptions, 29 yards, TD
- UP – Scott Orndoff – 4 receptions, 15 yards, TD

Top defenders

- PSU – Nyeem Wartman-White – 9 tackles, 3 tackles-for-loss (TFL)
- UP – Ryan Lewis – 9 tackles, INT

=== Temple ===
Temple vs. Penn State – Game summary

Quarter	1	2	3	4	Total
Temple	7	3	7	10	27
Penn State	14	7	3	10	34

at Beaver Stadium • University Park, Pennsylvania

- Date: September 17
- Game time: 12:00 p.m. EDT
- Game weather: 70 °F (21 °C); mostly cloudy
- Game attendance: 100,420
- Referee: Mike Roche
- TV announcers (BTN): Eric Collins, Glen Mason, Rick Pizzo
- ESPN Box Score, GoPSUsports.com

Game information

First quarter

- PSU – Chris Godwin, 52-yard TD pass from Trace McSorley, Tyler Davis kick good, 9:35 (PSU 7–0)
- TU – Jahad Thomas, 8-yard TD run, Austin Jones kick good, 8:54 (TIE 7–7)
- PSU – Andre Robinson, 3-yard TD run, Davis kick good, 2:50 (PSU 14–7)

Second quarter

- PSU – McSorley, 2-yard TD run, Davis kick good, 7:15 (PSU 21–7)
- TU – Jones, 45-yard field goal, 0:04 (PSU 21–10)

Third quarter

- PSU – Davis, 40-yard field goal, 9:03 (PSU 24–10)
- TU – Phillip Walker, 1-yard TD run, Davis kick good, 1:56 (PSU 24–17)

Fourth quarter

- PSU – Davis, 30-yard field goal, 12:45 (PSU 27–17)
- TU – Thomas, 2-yard TD run, Jones kick good, 8:10 (PSU 27–24)
- PSU – Saquon Barkley, 55-yard TD run, Davis kick good, 7:20 (PSU 34–24)
- TU – Jones, 34-yard field goal, 2:10 (PSU 34–27)

Top passers

- TU – P. J. Walker – 25/34, 286 yards, INT
- PSU – Trace McSorley – 18/24, 287 yards, TD, INT

Top rushers

- TU – Jahad Thomas – 14 carries, 52 yards 2 TD
- PSU – Saquon Barkley – 9 carries, 68 yards, TD

Top receivers

- TU – Thomas – 6 receptions, 48 yards
- PSU – Chris Godwin – 7 receptions, 117 yards, TD

Top defenders

- TU – Sean Chandler – 8 tackles, 1.5 tackles-for-loss (TFL)
- PSU – Malik Golden – 9 tackles

=== No. 4 Michigan ===
Penn State vs. Michigan – Game summary

Quarter	1	2	3	4	Total
Penn State	0	0	3	7	10
#4 Michigan	14	14	7	14	49

at Michigan Stadium • Ann Arbor, Michigan

- Date: September 24
- Game time: 3:30 p.m. EDT
- Game weather: 72 °F (22 °C); mostly sunny
- Game attendance: 110,319
- Referee: Daniel Capron
- TV announcers (ABC): Dave Flemming, Brian Griese, Todd McShay
- ESPN Box Score, GoPSUsports.com

Game information

First quarter

- UM – Khalid Hill, 1-yard TD run, Kenny Allen kick good, 9:51 (UM 7–0)
- UM – De'Veon Smith, 2-yard TD run, Allen kick good, 3:57 (UM 14–0)

Second quarter

- UM – Devin Asiasi, 3-yard TD pass from Wilton Speight, Allen kick good, 14:09 (UM 21–0)
- UM – Karan Higdon, 2-yard TD run, Allen kick good, 0:46 (UM 28–0)

Third quarter

- PSU – Tyler Davis, 21-yard field goal, 11:31 (UM 28–3)
- UM – Chris Evans, 3-yard TD run, Allen kick good, 2:42 (UM 35–3)

Fourth quarter

- PSU – Chris Godwin, 8-yard TD pass from Trace McSorley, Davis kick good, 11:22 (UM 35–10)
- UM – Higdon, 40-yard TD run, Allen kick good, 6:11 (UM 42–10)
- UM – Ty Isaac, 3-yard TD run, Allen kick good, 2:04 (UM 49–10)

Top passers

- PSU – Trace McSorley – 16/27, 121 yards, TD, INT
- UM – Wilton Speight – 21/34, 189 yards, TD

Top rushers

- PSU – Saquon Barkley – 15 carries, 59 yards
- UM – De'Veon Smith – 12 carries, 107 yards, TD

Top receivers

- PSU – Barkley – 5 receptions, 77 yards
- PSU – Mike Gesicki - 5 receptions, 23 yards
- UM – Amara Darboh – 7 receptions, 44 yards

Top defenders

- PSU – Malik Golden – 11 tackles, 1 tackle-for-loss (TFL)
- UM – Ben Gedeon – 11 tackles, 1.5 tackles-for-loss (TFL)

=== Minnesota ===
Minnesota vs. Penn State – Game summary

Quarter	1	2	3	4	OT	Total
Minnesota	3	10	0	10	3	26
Penn State	0	3	17	3	6	29

at Beaver Stadium • University Park, Pennsylvania

- Date: October 1
- Game time: 3:30 p.m. EDT
- Game weather: 57 °F (14 °C); cloudy, showers
- Game attendance: 95,332
- Referee: Don Willard
- TV announcers (BTN): Brandon Gaudin, Chuck Long
- ESPN Box Score, GoPSUsports.com

Game information

First quarter

- UM – Emmit Carpenter, 37-yard field goal, 0:55 (UM 3–0)

Second quarter

- PSU – Tyler Davis, 19-yard field goal, 12:00 (TIE 3–3)
- UM – Drew Wolitarsky, 9-yard TD pass from Mitch Leidner, Carpenter kick good, 2:06 (UM 10–3)
- UM – Carpenter, 35-yard field goal, 0:01 (UM 13–3)

Third quarter

- PSU – Irvin Charles, 80-yard TD pass from Trace McSorley, Davis kick good, 9:54 (UM 13–10)
- PSU – Davis, 27-yard field goal, 7:28 (TIE 13–13)
- PSU – McSorley, 6-yard TD run, Davis kick good, 2:27 (PSU 20–13)

Fourth quarter

- UM – Shannon Brooks, 37-yard TD run, Carpenter kick good, 13:29 (TIE 20–20)
- UM – Carpenter, 37-yard field goal, 0:54 (UM 23–20)
- PSU – Davis, 40-yard field goal, 0:02 (TIE 23–23)

Overtime

- UM – Carpenter, 46-yard field goal (UM 26–23)
- PSU – Saquon Barkley, 25-yard TD run (PSU 29–26)

Top passers

- UM – Mitch Leidner – 24/40, 241 yards, TD, INT
- PSU – Trace McSorley – 19/41, 335 yards, TD

Top rushers

- UM – Rodney Smith – 23 carries, 104 yards
- PSU – Saquon Barkley – 20 carries, 63 yards, TD
- PSU – McSorley – 8 carries, 73 yards, TD

Top receivers

- UM – Brian Smith – 7 receptions, 101 yards
- UM – Drew Wolitarsky – 7 receptions, 69 yards, TD
- PSU – Mike Gesicki – 5 receptions, 70 yards

Top defenders

- UM – Damarius Travis – 9 tackles, 1 tackle-for-loss (TFL)
- PSU – Marcus Allen – 22 tackles, 1 tackle-for-loss (TFL)

=== Maryland ===
Maryland vs. Penn State – Game summary

Quarter	1	2	3	4	Total
Maryland	7	7	0	0	14
Penn State	7	17	7	7	38

at Beaver Stadium • University Park, Pennsylvania

- Date: October 8
- Game time: 12:00 p.m. EDT
- Game weather: 64 °F (18 °C); rain, mostly cloudy
- Game attendance: 100,778
- Referee: John O'Neill
- TV announcers (BTN): Kevin Kugler, Matt Millen, Lisa Byington
- ESPN Box Score, GoPSUsports.com

Game information

First quarter

- PSU – Mike Gesicki, 5-yard TD pass from Trace McSorley, Tyler Davis kick good, 12:33 (PSU 7–0)
- UM – Ty Johnson, 66-yard TD pass from Perry Hills, Adam Greene kick good, 7:13 (TIE 7–7)

Second quarter

- PSU – Davis, 30-yard field goal, 12:20 (PSU 10–7)
- PSU – McSorley, 9-yard TD run, Davis kick good, 6:06 (PSU 17–7)
- UM – Tyrell Pigrome, 7-yard TD run, Greene kick good, 0:52 (PSU 17–14)
- PSU – Saquon Barkley, 45-yard TD run, Davis kick good, 0:15 (PSU 24–14)

Third quarter

- PSU – DeAndre Thompkins, 70-yard TD pass from McSorley, Davis kick good, 0:00 (PSU 31–14)

Fourth quarter

- PSU – Miles Sanders, 25-yard TD run, Davis kick good, 5:15 (PSU 38–14)

Top passers

- UM – Tyrell Pigrome – 5/9, 28 yards
- UM – Perry Hills – 5/7, 72 yards, TD, INT
- PSU – Trace McSorley – 10/19, 152 yards, 2 TD

Top rushers

- UM – Lorenzo Harrison – 6 carries, 76 yards
- PSU – Saquon Barkley – 31 carries, 202 yards, TD

Top receivers

- UM – D. J. Moore – 4 receptions, 15 yards
- PSU – DeAndre Thompkins – 4 receptions, 91 yards, TD

Top defenders

- UM – Shane Cockerille – 13 tackles, 1 tackle-for-loss (TFL)
- PSU – Brandon Smith – 14 tackles, 1 tackle-for-loss (TFL), INT

=== No. 2 Ohio State ===
Ohio State vs. Penn State – Game summary

Quarter	1	2	3	4	Total
#2 Ohio State	0	12	9	0	21
Penn State	0	7	0	17	24

at Beaver Stadium • University Park, Pennsylvania

- Date: October 22
- Game time: 8:00 p.m. EDT
- Game weather: 43 °F (6 °C); cold, windy, brisk
- Game attendance: 107,280
- Referee: Michael Cannon
- TV announcers (ABC): Chris Fowler, Kirk Herbstreit, Sam Ponder
- ESPN Box Score, GoPSUsports.com

Game information

First quarter

No scoring

Second quarter

- OSU – Tyler Durbin, 33-yard field goal, 14:55 (OSU 3–0)
- OSU – Marcus Baugh, 26-yard TD pass from J. T. Barrett, kick failed, 4:53 (OSU 9–0)
- OSU – Durbin, 30-yard field goal, 1:14 (OSU 12–0)
- PSU – Chris Godwin, 20-yard TD pass from Trace McSorley, Tyler Davis kick good, 0:09 (OSU 12–7)

Third quarter

- OSU – Curtis Samuel, 74-yard TD run, Durbin kick good, 10:10 (OSU 19–7)
- OSU – Team safety (PSU fumble recovered in end zone), 8:31 (OSU 21–7)

Fourth quarter

- PSU – McSorley, 2-yard TD run, Davis kick good, 13:32 (OSU 21–14)
- PSU – Davis, 34-yard field goal, 9:33 (OSU 21–17)
- PSU – Grant Haley, 60-yard TD run from blocked OSU field goal, Davis kick good, 4:27 (PSU 24–21)

Top passers

- OSU – J. T. Barrett – 28/43, 245 yards, TD
- PSU – Trace McSorley – 8/23, 154 yards, TD

Top rushers

- OSU – Mike Weber – 21 carries, 71 yards
- PSU – Saquon Barkley – 12 carries, 99 yards
- PSU – McSorley – 19 carries, 63 yards, TD

Top receivers

- OSU – Curtis Samuel – 8 receptions, 68 yards
- OSU – Weber – 8 receptions, 36 yards
- PSU – Mike Gesicki – 4 receptions, 46 yards

Top defenders

- OSU – Malik Hooker – 7 tackles, 2 tackles-for-loss (TFL)
- PSU – Brandon Bell – 18 tackles, 1 tackle-for-loss (TFL), 1 sack

=== Purdue ===
Penn State vs. Purdue – Game summary

Quarter	1	2	3	4	Total
#24 Penn State	7	10	24	21	62
Purdue	7	10	7	0	24

at Ross–Ade Stadium • West Lafayette, Indiana

- Date: October 29
- Game time: 12:00 p.m. EDT
- Game weather: 67 °F (19 °C); partly sunny
- Game attendance: 33,157
- Referee: Jeff Servinski
- TV announcers (ABC/ESPN2): Beth Mowins, Anthony Becht, Rocky Boiman
- ESPN Box Score, GoPSUsports.com

Game information

First quarter

- PSU – Saquon Barkley, 3-yard TD run, Tyler Davis kick good, 11:33 (PSU 7–0)
- PU – Markell Jones, 1-yard TD run, J. D. Dellinger kick good, 6:26 (TIE 7–7)

Second quarter

- PU – Cameron Posey, 1-yard TD pass from David Blough, Dellinger kick good, 14:32 (PU 14–7)
- PSU – Chris Godwin, 38-yard TD pass from Trace McSorley, Davis kick good, 12:33 (TIE 14–14)
- PU – Dellinger, 42-yard field goal, 6:57 (PU 17–14)
- PSU – Davis, 33-yard field goal, 2:36 (TIE 17–17)

Third quarter

- PSU – Godwin, 1-yard TD pass from McSorley, Davis kick good, 12:29 (PSU 24–17)
- PSU – Andre Robinson, 4-yard TD run, Davis kick good, 8:17 (PSU 31–17)
- PSU – Davis, 29-yard field goal, 4:21 (PSU 34–17)
- PU – DeAngelo Yancey, 62-yard TD pass from Blough, Dellinger kick good, 2:32 (PSU 34–24)
- PSU – Miles Sanders, 21-yard TD pass from McSorley, Davis kick good, 1:18 (PSU 41–24)

Fourth quarter

- PSU – Barkley, 81-yard TD run, Davis kick good, 13:56 (PSU 48–24)
- PSU – Mark Allen, 1-yard TD run, Davis kick good, 6:09 (PSU 55–24)
- PSU – Robinson, 19-yard TD run, Davis kick good, 2:25 (PSU 62–24)

Top passers

- PSU – Trace McSorley – 12/23, 228 yards, 3 TD
- PU – David Blough – 34/50, 281 yards, 2 TD INT

Top rushers

- PSU – Saquon Barkley – 18 carries, 207 yards, 2 TD
- PSU – Tommy Stevens – 5 carries, 31 yards
- PU – Markell Jones – 7 carries, 46 yards, TD

Top receivers

- PSU – Barkley – 3 receptions, 70 yards
- PSU – Chris Godwin – 5 receptions, 58 yards, 2 TD
- PU – Cameron Posey – 8 receptions, 50 yards, TD

Top defenders

- PSU – Jason Cabinda – 9 tackles
- PSU – Malik Golden – 8 tackles, 1 tackle-for-loss (TFL)
- PU – Markus Bailey – 7 tackles, 1 tackle-for-loss (TFL)

=== Iowa ===
Iowa vs. Penn State – Game summary

Quarter	1	2	3	4	Total
Iowa	0	7	0	7	14
#20 Penn State	7	17	3	14	41

at Beaver Stadium • University Park, Pennsylvania

- Date: November 5
- Game time: 7:30 p.m. EDT
- Game weather: 56 °F (13 °C); clear, pleasant
- Game attendance: 106,194
- Referee: Ron Snodgrass
- TV announcers (BTN): Kevin Kugler, Matt Millen, Lisa Byington
- ESPN Box Score, GoPSUsports.com

Game information

First quarter

- PSU – Saeed Blacknall, 19-yard TD pass from Trace McSorley, Tyler Davis kick good, 12:43 (PSU 7–0)

Second quarter

- PSU – Saquon Barkley, 57-yard TD run, Davis kick good, 10:28 (PSU 14–0)
- PSU – McSorley, 1-yard TD run, Davis kick good, 7:58 (PSU 21–0)
- UI – Akrum Wadley, 12-yard TD pass from C. J. Beathard, Keith Duncan kick good, 4:18 (PSU 21–7)
- PSU – Davis, 30-yard field goal, 0:00 (PSU 24–7)

Third quarter

- PSU – Davis, 37-yard field goal, 2:48 (PSU 27–7)

Fourth quarter

- PSU – Barkley, 4-yard TD pass from McSorley, Davis kick good, 14:41 (PSU 34–7)
- PSU – Tommy Stevens, 13-yard TD run, Davis kick good, 9:28 (PSU 41–7)
- UI – Jerminic Smith, 36-yard TD pass from Beathard, Duncan kick good, 6:30 (PSU 41–14)

Top passers

- UI – C. J. Beathard – 18/26, 204 yards, 2 TD, INT
- PSU – Trace McSorley – 11/18, 240 yards, 2 TD

Top rushers

- UI – Akrum Wadley – 9 carries, 28 yards
- PSU – Saquon Barkley – 20 carries, 167 yards, TD

Top receivers

- UI – Jerminic Smith – 5 receptions, 85 yards, TD
- UI – Wadley – 5 receptions, 32 yards, TD
- PSU – Chris Godwin – 4 receptions, 87 yards
- PSU – Mike Gesicki – 4 receptions, 65 yards

Top defenders

- UI – Brandon Snyder – 12 tackles, 2 tackles-for-loss (TFL)
- PSU – Jason Cabinda – 8 tackles, 0.5 tackles-for-loss (TFL)

=== Indiana ===
Penn State vs. Indiana – Game summary

Quarter	1	2	3	4	Total
#12 Penn State	7	7	7	24	45
Indiana	0	14	10	7	31

at Memorial Stadium • Bloomington, Indiana

- Date: November 12
- Game time: 12:00 p.m. ET
- Game weather: 45 °F (7 °C); sunny
- Game attendance: 40,678
- Referee: Michael Cannon
- TV announcers (ABC/ESPN2): Bob Wischusen, Brock Huard, Allison Williams
- ESPN Box Score, GoPSUsports.com

Game information

First quarter

- PSU – Trace McSorley, 10-yard TD run, Tyler Davis kick good, 11:28 (PSU 7–0)

Second quarter

- IU – Ricky Jones, 5-yard TD pass from Richard Lagow, Griffin Oakes kick good, 12:13 (TIE 7–7)
- PSU – Chris Godwin, 6-yard TD pass from McSorley, Davis kick good, 4:43 (PSU 14–7)
- IU – Devine Redding, 12-yard TD run, Oakes kick good, 1:00 (TIE 14–14)

Third quarter

- IU – Oakes, 47-yard field goal, 11:38 (IU 17–14)
- IU – Redding, 6-yard TD run, Oakes kick good, 3:13 (IU 24–14)
- PSU – Godwin, 21-yard TD pass from McSorley, Davis kick good, 1:09 (IU 24–21)

Fourth quarter

- PSU – Saquon Barkley, 4-yard TD run, Davis kick good, 12:23 (PSU 28–24)
- IU – Nick Westbrook, 40-yard TD pass from Lagow, Oakes kick good, 11:06 (IU 31–28)
- PSU – Barkley, 2-yard TD run, Davis kick good, 3:58 (PSU 35–31)
- PSU – Davis, 39-yard field goal, 1:07 (PSU 38–31)
- PSU – Torrence Brown, 9-yard fumble return for TD, Davis kick good, 0:29 (PSU 45–31)

Top passers

- PSU – Trace McSorley – 16/30, 332 yards, 2 TD, 2 INT
- IU – Richard Lagow – 23/40, 292 yards, 2 TD

Top rushers

- PSU – Saquon Barkley – 33 carries, 58 yards, 2 TD
- IU – Devine Redding – 23 carries, 108 yards, 2 TD

Top receivers

- PSU – Mike Gesicki – 5 receptions, 88 yards
- PSU – Chris Godwin – 5 receptions, 82 yards, 2 TD
- IU – Mitchell Paige – 6 receptions, 43 yards

Top defenders

- PSU – Marcus Allen – 10 tackles, 1.5 tackles-for-loss (TFL)
- IU – Tegray Scales – 9 tackles, 4 tackles-for-loss (TFL), 1 sack

=== Rutgers ===
Penn State vs. Rutgers – Game summary

Quarter	1	2	3	4	Total
#9 Penn State	6	3	16	14	39
Rutgers	0	0	0	0	0

at High Point Solutions Stadium • Piscataway, New Jersey

- Date: November 19
- Game time: 8:00 p.m. ET
- Game weather: 52 °F (11 °C); cloudy, rain later, wind
- Game attendance: 51,366
- Referee: Don Willard
- TV announcers (BTN): Kevin Kugler, Matt Millen, Lisa Byington
- ESPN Box Score, GoPSUsports.com

Game information

First quarter

- PSU – Tyler Davis, 32-yard field goal, 6:34 (PSU 3–0)
- PSU – Davis, 34-yard field goal, 1:42 (PSU 6–0)

Second quarter

- PSU – Davis, 40-yard field goal, 5:28 (PSU 9–0)

Third quarter

- PSU – Saquon Barkley, 1-yard TD run, Davis kick good, 12:33 (PSU 16–0)
- PSU – Davis, 32-yard field goal, 6:46 (PSU 19–0)
- PSU – Andre Robinson, 2-yard TD run, 2-point conversion failed, 3:32 (PSU 25–0)

Fourth quarter

- PSU – Mark Allen, 27-yard TD pass from Trace McSorley, Davis kick good, 7:59 (PSU 32–0)
- PSU – Tommy Stevens, 12-yard TD run, Davis kick good, 4:07 (PSU 39–0)

Top passers

- PSU – Trace McSorley – 17/33, 210 yards, TD
- RU – Giovanni Rescigno – 7/16, 48 yards

Top rushers

- PSU – Saquon Barkley – 16 carries, 92 yards, TD
- RU – Justin Goodwin – 10 carries, 20 yards

Top receivers

- PSU – Mike Gesicki – 5 receptions, 47 yards
- RU – Andre Patton – 4 receptions, 29 yards

Top defenders

- PSU – Brandon Bell – 5 tackles, 1 tackle-for-loss (TFL), 1 sack
- RU – Saquan Hampton – 11 tackles

=== Michigan State ===
Michigan State vs. Penn State – Game summary

Quarter	1	2	3	4	Total
Michigan State	6	6	0	0	12
#8 Penn State	0	10	21	14	45

at Beaver Stadium • University Park, Pennsylvania

- Date: November 26
- Game time: 3:30 p.m. ET
- Game weather: 41 °F (5 °C); cold, cloudy
- Game attendance: 97,418
- Referee: John O'Neill
- TV announcers (ESPN): Bob Wischusen, Brock Huard, Allison Williams
- ESPN Box Score, GoPSUsports.com

Game information

First quarter

- MSU – Michael Geiger, 28-yard field goal, 8:13 (MSU 3–0)
- MSU – Geiger, 36-yard field goal, 2:44 (MSU 6–0)

Second quarter

- PSU – Tyler Davis, 35-yard field goal, 13:11 (MSU 6–3)
- MSU – Geiger, 33-yard field goal, 7:17 (MSU 9–3)
- PSU – Saquon Barkley, 1-yard TD run, Davis kick good, 2:14 (PSU 10–9)
- MSU – Geiger, 21-yard field goal, 0:14 (MSU 12–10)

Third quarter

- PSU – Chris Godwin, 34-yard TD pass from Trace McSorley, Davis kick good, 11:02 (PSU 17–12)
- PSU – Mike Gesicki, 45-yard TD pass from McSorley, Davis kick good, 7:03 (PSU 24–12)
- PSU – Godwin, 59-yard TD pass from McSorley, Davis kick good, 2:05 (PSU 31–12)

Fourth quarter

- PSU – Andre Robinson, 14-yard TD run, Davis kick good, 6:33 (PSU 38–12)
- PSU – Robinson, 40-yard TD pass from McSorley, Davis kick good, 3:40 (PSU 45–12)

Top passers

- MSU – Tyler O'Connor – 17/33, 118 yards
- PSU – Trace McSorley – 17/23, 376 yards, 4 TD

Top rushers

- MSU – L. J. Scott – 16 carries, 59 yards
- PSU – Andre Robinson – 3 carries, 32 yards, TD
- PSU – Saquon Barkley – 12 carries, 14 yards, TD

Top receivers

- MSU – Josiah Price – 6 receptions, 63 yards
- PSU – Chris Godwin – 5 receptions, 135 yards, 2 TD

Top defenders

- MSU – Montae Nicholson – 8 tackles
- PSU – Brandon Bell – 18 tackles, 0.5 tackles-for-loss (TFL)

=== No. 6 Wisconsin—Big Ten Championship Game ===
Wisconsin vs. Penn State – Game summary

Quarter	1	2	3	4	Total
#6 Wisconsin	14	14	3	0	31
#8 Penn State	7	7	14	10	38

at Lucas Oil Stadium • Indianapolis, Indiana

- Date: December 3
- Game time: 8:00 p.m. ET
- Game weather: indoors, roof closed
- Game attendance: 65,018
- Referee: Michael Cannon
- TV announcers (Fox): Gus Johnson, Joel Klatt, Shannon Spake
- ESPN Box Score, GoPSUsports.com

Game information

First quarter

- UW – Austin Ramesh, 1-yard TD run, Andrew Endicott kick good, 5:27 (UW 7–0)
- UW – Corey Clement, 67-yard TD run, Endicott kick good, 3:06 (UW 14–0)
- PSU – Mike Gesicki, 33-yard TD pass from Trace McSorley, Tyler Davis kick good, 1:10 (UW 14–7)

Second quarter

- UW – Ryan Connelly, 12-yard TD run (fumble recovery from high snap), Endicott kick good, 9:42 (UW 21–7)
- UW – Dare Ogunbowale, 7-yard TD run, Endicott kick good, 5:15 (UW 28–7)
- PSU – Saeed Blacknall, 40-yard TD pass from McSorley, Davis kick good, 0:58 (UW 28–14)

Third quarter

- PSU – Blacknall, 70-yard TD pass from McSorley, Davis kick good, 10:58 (UW 28–21)
- PSU – Saquon Barkley, 1-yard TD run, Davis kick good, 4:22 (TIE 28–28)
- UW – Endicott, 23-yard field goal, 0:16 (UW 31–28)

Fourth quarter

- PSU – Barkley, 18-yard TD pass from McSorley, Davis kick good, 13:41 (PSU 35–31)
- PSU – Davis, 24-yard field goal, 5:14 (PSU 38–31)

Top passers

- UW – Bart Houston – 16/21, 174 yards
- PSU – Trace McSorley – 22/31, 384 yards, 4 TD

Top rushers

- UW – Corey Clement – 21 carries, 164 yards, TD
- PSU – Saquon Barkley – 19 carries, 83 yards, TD

Top receivers

- UW – Jazz Peavy – 4 receptions, 53 yards
- UW – Dare Ogunbowale – 4 receptions, 28 yards
- PSU – DaeSean Hamilton – 8 receptions, 118 yards
- PSU – Saeed Blacknall – 6 receptions, 155 yards, 2 TD

Top defenders

- UW – Vince Biegel – 8 tackles
- PSU – Brandon Bell – 13 tackles, 1 tackle-for-loss (TFL), 1 sack

=== No. 9 USC—Rose Bowl ===
USC vs. Penn State – Game summary

Quarter	1	2	3	4	Total
#9 USC	13	14	8	17	52
#5 Penn State	0	21	28	0	49

at Rose Bowl • Pasadena, California

- Date: January 2, 2017
- Game time: 5:00 p.m. ET
- Game weather: 55 °F (13 °C); cloudy
- Game attendance: 95,128
- Referee: Duane Heydt
- TV announcers (ESPN): Chris Fowler, Kirk Herbstreit, Samantha Ponder
- ESPN Box Score, GoPSUsports.com

Game information

First quarter

- USC – Deontay Burnett, 26-yard TD pass from Sam Darnold, Matt Boermeester kick good, 10:31 (USC 7–0)
- USC – Boermeester, 22-yard field goal, 4:42 (USC 10–0)
- USC – Boermeester, 44-yard field goal, 0:21 (USC 13–0)

Second quarter

- PSU – Saquon Barkley, 24-yard TD run, Tyler Davis kick good, 11:44 (USC 13–7)
- USC – Burnett, 3-yard TD pass from Darnold, Boermeester kick good, 10:15 (USC 20–7)
- PSU – Chris Godwin, 30-yard TD pass from Trace McSorley, Davis kick good, 8:39 (USC 20–14)
- USC – Darreus Rogers, 3-yard TD pass from Darnold, Boermeester kick good, 6:16 (USC 27–14)
- PSU – Mike Gesicki, 11-yard TD pass from McSorley, Davis kick good, 0:54 (USC 27–21)

Third quarter

- PSU – Barkley, 79-yard TD run, Davis kick good, 13:05 (PSU 28–27)
- PSU – Godwin, 72-yard TD run, Davis kick good, 11:27 (PSU 35–27)
- PSU – McSorley, 3-yard TD TD run, Davis kick good, 10:26 (PSU 42–27)
- USC – JuJu Smith-Schuster, 13-yard TD pass from Darnold, Taylor McNamara pass from Darnold for 2-point conversion, 6:47 (PSU 42–35)
- PSU – Barkley, 7-yard TD pass from McSorley, Davis kick good, 1:55 (PSU 49–35)

Fourth quarter

- USC – Ronald Jones II, 3-yard TD TD run, Boermeester kick good, 8:15 (PSU 49–42)
- USC – Burnett, 27-yard TD pass from Darnold, Boermeester kick good, 1:20 (TIE 49–49)
- USC – Boermeester, 46-yard field goal, 0:00 (USC 52–49)

Top passers

- USC – Sam Darnold – 33/53, 453 yards, 5 TD, INT
- PSU – Trace McSorley – 18/29, 254 yards, 4 TD, 3 INT

Top rushers

- USC – Ronald Jones II – 20 carries, 55 yards, TD
- PSU – Saquon Barkley – 25 carries, 194 yards, 2 TD

Top receivers

- USC – Deontay Burnett – 13 receptions, 164 yards, 3 TD
- PSU – Chris Godwin – 9 receptions, 2 TD

Top defenders

- USC – Stevie Tu'ikolovatu – 8 tackles
- PSU – Jason Cabinda – 11 tackles

== Personnel ==
=== Coaching staff ===
Position	Name	Alma mater
Head coach	James Franklin	East Stroudsburg (1994)
Defensive coordinator/linebackers	Brent Pry	Buffalo (1993)
Offensive coordinator/ quarterbacks	Joe Moorhead	Fordham University (1995)
Safeties/co-defensive coordinator	Tim Banks	Central Michigan University (1994)
Running backs/special teams coordinator	Charles Huff	Hampton (2005)
Tight ends/passing game coordinator	Ricky Rahne	Cornell (2002)
Wide Receivers/offensive recruiting coordinator	Josh Gattis	Wake Forest (2006)
Cornerbacks/defensive recruiting coordinator	Terry Smith	Penn State (1991)
Offensive line	Matt Limegrover	University of Chicago (1990)
Defensive line/run game coordinator	Sean Spencer	Clarion (1995)
Strength and conditioning	Dwight Galt	Maryland (1981)
Graduate assistant	Joe Brady IV	College of William & Mary (2013)
Graduate assistant	Tommy Galt	Maryland (2009)
Graduate assistant	Andrew Jackson	LIU Post (2011)
Graduate assistant	Ryan Smith	College of William & Mary (2014)

=== Roster ===
2016 Penn State Nittany Lions football team roster
Players
Coaches
Offense

Pos.	#	Name	Class
QB	2	Tommy Stevens	Fr
WR	3	DeAndre Thompkins	So
WR	5	DaeSean Hamilton	Jr
RB	6	Andre Robinson	Fr
QB	7	Jake Zembiec	Fr
RB	8	Mark Allen	So
QB	9	Trace McSorley	So
WR	10	Brandon Polk	So
WR	11	Irvin Charles	Fr
WR	12	Chris Godwin	Jr
WR	13	Saeed Blacknall	Jr
QB	15	Michael Shuster	Fr
QB	16	Billy Fessler	So
TE	18	Jonathan Holland	Fr
WR	19	Gregg Garrity	Sr
RB	24	Miles Sanders	Fr
RB	26	Saquon Barkley	So
WR	28	Christopher Welde	So
RB	32	Irvine Paye	Jr
WR	39	Josh McPhearson	Jr
RB	40	Nick Eury	Fr
OL	51	Alex Gellerstedt	Fr
G, C	52	Ryan Bates	Fr
G, C	53	Derek Dowrey	Sr
C, G	55	Wendy Laurent	Sr
G, C	57	Steven Gonzalez	Fr
OT	58	Chance Sorrell	So
OT	59	Andrew Nelson	Jr
OT	60	Noah Beh	So
G	62	Michal Menet	Fr
G	64	Zach Simpson	Fr
OL	66	Connor McGovern	Fr
G	68	Hunter Kelly	Fr
G, C	69	Adam De Boef	So
G, C	70	Brendan Mahon	Jr
OT	71	Will Fries	Fr
G, C	72	Brian Gaia	Sr
OT	73	Paris Palmer	Sr
OT	75	Brendan Brosnan	So
OT	76	Sterling Jenkins	Fr
G, C	77	Chasz Wright	So
C, G	78	Tom Devenney	Jr
OT	79	Charlie Shuman	So
TE	80	Danny Dalton	Fr
WR	81	Gordon Bentley	Jr
TE	81	Steven Grampp	Fr
WR	82	Tyler Shoop	Fr
TE	83	Nick Bowers	Fr
WR	84	Juwan Johnson	Fr
WR	85	Isaac Lutz	Fr
WR	86	Cody Hodgens	Jr
WR	87	Dae'Lun Darien	Fr
TE	88	Mike Gesicki	Jr
TE	89	Tom Pancoast	Jr

Defense

Pos.	#	Name	Class
CB	1	Christian Campbell	Jr
S	2	Marcus Allen	Jr
S	4	Nick Scott	So
LB	5	Nyeem Wartman-White	Sr
S	6	Malik Golden	Sr
LB	7	Koa Farmer	So
LB	9	Jarvis Miller	Fr
LB	11	Brandon Bell	Sr
CB	12	Jordan Smith	Sr
CB	14	Zech McPhearson	Fr
CB	15	Grant Haley	Jr
S	16	John Petrishen	Fr
CB	17	Garrett Taylor	Fr
DE	19	Torrence Brown	So
LB	20	Johnathan Thomas	So
CB	21	Amani Oruwariye	So
S	23	Ayron Monroe	Fr
LB	25	Von Walker	Sr
CB	27	T. J. Johnson	Fr
S	28	Troy Apke	Jr
CB	29	John Reid	So
DT	30	Kevin Givens	Fr
LB	31	Cam Brown	Fr
S	32	Mitchell Vallone	Jr
LB	33	Jake Cooper	So
DE	34	Shane Simmons	Fr
LB	36	Jan Johnson	Fr
CB	36	Troy Shorts	Fr
CB	37	Kyle Alston	Jr
CB	38	Desi Davis	So
LB	39	Frank Di Leo	Fr
LB	40	Jason Cabinda	Jr
DT	41	Parker Cothren	Jr
DT	42	Ellison Jordan	Fr
LB	43	Manny Bowen	So
DE	44	Shaka Toney	Fr
LB	45	Joe DuMond	Fr
DE	46	Colin Castagna	So
S	47	Will Blair	Fr
LB	47	Brandon Smith	Jr
DE	48	Shareef Miller	Fr
DE	49	Daniel Joseph	Fr
LB	51	Jason Vranic	Jr
DT	52	Curtis Cothran	Fr
DT	54	Robert Windsor	Fr
DT	55	Antonio Shelton	Fr
DT	56	Tyrell Chavis	Jr
DE	90	Garrett Sickels	Jr
DT	91	Ryan Monk	Fr
DT	93	Antoine White	So
DE	94	Evan Schwan	Sr
DT	96	Immanuel Iyke	Fr
DE	97	Ryan Buchholz	Fr
DT	99	Brenon Thrift	So

Special teams

Pos.	#	Name	Class
K, P	37	Chris Gulla	Jr
SN	41	Zach Ladonis	Jr
SN	44	Tyler Yazujian	Sr
K	90	Alex Barbir	Fr
P	92	Daniel Pasquariello	Jr
P, K	93	Blake Gillikin	Fr
K, P	95	Tyler Davis	Jr
SN	96	Kyle Vasey	So
SN	97	Nick Cox	Fr
K, P	98	Jordan Wombacker	Fr
K	99	Joey Julius	So

Head coach

- James Franklin

Coordinators/assistant coaches

- Brent Pry (defensive coordinator/associate head coach/linebackers)
- Joe Moorhead (offensive coordinator/quarterbacks)
- Charles Huff (running backs/special teams coordinator)
- Ricky Rahne (tight ends/passing game coordinator)
- Josh Gattis (wide receivers/offensive recruiting coordinator)
- Terry Smith (cornerbacks/defensive recruiting coordinator)
- Tim Banks (safeties/co-defensive coordinator)
- Matt Limegrover (offensive line)
- Sean Spencer (defensive line/run game coordinator)
- Dwight Galt (strength and conditioning)
- Joe Brady IV (graduate assistant)
- Tommy Galt (graduate assistant)
- Andrew Jackson (graduate assistant)
- Ryan Smith (graduate assistant)

Legend

- (C) Team captain
- (S) Suspended
- (I) Ineligible
- Injured
- Redshirt

Roster

== Awards and honors ==
=== Players ===
Awards
Player	Award	Date Awarded	Ref.
Marcus Allen	Big Ten Co-Defensive Player of the Week	October 3, 2016	
Saquon Barkley	Big Ten Offensive Player of the Week	October 10, 2016	
Brandon Smith	Big Ten Defensive Player of the Week	October 10, 2016	
Brandon Bell	Big Ten Defensive Player of the Week	October 24, 2016	
Marcus Allen	Big Ten Co-Special Teams Player of the Week	October 24, 2016	
Grant Haley	Big Ten Co-Special Teams Player of the Week	October 24, 2016	
Saquon Barkley	Big Ten Offensive Player of the Week	October 31, 2016	
Connor McGovern	Big Ten Freshman of the Week	November 7, 2016	
Tyler Davis	Big Ten Co-Special Teams Player of the Week	November 21, 2016	
Trace McSorley	Big Ten Offensive Player of the Week	November 29, 2016	
Saquon Barkley	Big Ten Offensive Player of the Year	November 30, 2016	
Saquon Barkley	Ameche-Dayne Running Back of the Year	November 29, 2016	
Saquon Barkley	Chicago Tribune Silver Football	December 7, 2016	

All-Big Ten
Player	Selection
Grant Haley	First Team (Coaches & Media)
Tyler Davis	First Team (Coaches); Second Team (Media)
Saquon Barkley	Second Team (Coaches & Media)
Trace McSorley	Second Team (Coaches & Media)
Garrett Sickels	Second Team (Coaches); Third Team (Media)
Evan Schwan	Third Team (Coaches & Media)
Jason Cabinda	Third Team (Coaches); Honorable Mention (Media)
Marcus Allen	Third Team (Coaches); Honorable Mention (Media)
Chris Godwin	Third Team (Media); Honorable Mention (Coaches)
Mike Gesicki	Second Team (Media); Honorable Mention (Coaches)
Brandon Bell	Honorable Mention (Coaches & Media)
Brian Gaia	Honorable Mention (Coaches & Media)
Blake Gillikin	Honorable Mention (Coaches & Media)
Parker Cothren	Honorable Mention (Coaches)
John Reid	Honorable Mention (Coaches & Media)

=== Coaches ===
Awards
Coach	Award	Date Awarded	Ref.
James Franklin	Dave McClain Coach of the Year (media vote)	November 22, 2016	
James Franklin	Sporting News College Football Coach of the Year	December 7, 2016	
