= Brandon Bell (American football) =

American football player (born 1995)

No. 52, 51, 41
- Position: Linebacker

Personal information
- Born: January 9, 1995 (age 31); Mays Landing, New Jersey, U.S.
- Listed height: 6 ft 1 in (1.85 m)
- Listed weight: 229 lb (104 kg)

Career information
- High school: Oakcrest (Hamilton Township, New Jersey)
- College: Penn State
- NFL draft: 2017: undrafted

Career history
- Cincinnati Bengals (2017–2018); Carolina Panthers (2019)*; Seattle Dragons (2020)
- * Offseason or practice squad member only

Career NFL statistics
- Total tackles: 14
- Stats at Pro Football Reference

Brandon JaMarr Bell (born January 9, 1995) is an American former professional football player who was a linebacker in the National Football League (NFL). He played college football for the Penn State Nittany Lions.

== Early life ==
Bell attended Oakcrest High School in New Jersey. He played running back and linebacker for the football team.

College recruiting
Name	Hometown	School	Height	Weight	40^{‡}	Commit date
Brandon Bell; LB	Mays Landing NJ	Oakcrest High School	6 ft 1 in (1.85 m)	227 lb (103 kg)	4.53	Jun 13, 2012
Brandon Bell; LB	Recruit ratings: Scout: Rivals: 247Sports: (77)					
Overall recruit ranking:
‡ Refers to 40-yard dash; Note: In many cases, Scout, Rivals, 247Sports, On3, and ESPN may conflict in their listings of height, weight and 40 time.; In these cases, the average was taken. ESPN grades are on a 100-point scale.; Sources: "2012 Team Ranking". Rivals.com.

== College career ==
=== Freshman year ===
During his first year at Penn State, Bell played in seven games with twenty-three total tackles, fourteen solo tackles. In his first game as a Nittany Lion he recorded two tackles one of them a solo tackle in a 45–7 win over Eastern Michigan. His best game statistically was vs Wisconsin on November 11 he recorded six tackles four of them solo in a win during the season finale.

=== Sophomore year ===
During the 2014 season, Bell began getting a substantial increase of playing time. He started ten games for Penn State. Bell recorded his first college interception in a game against Rutgers and the next week vs UMass he had his first sack in a 48–7 win. Bell's best game of his career and the year was a thirteen tackle effort and also a sack in a 31-24 Double Over-Time loss to the Ohio State Buckeyes. Bell finished the year with a total of 43 tackles, two sacks and one interception in ten games.

=== Junior year ===
Bell set career highs with sacks and tackling during the 2015 campaign. Totaling 56 tackles and three and a half sacks Bell was one of Penn State's best defenders. In the first game of the year Bell had one sack and seven tacks vs the Temple Owls. His best game of the year was a nine tackle performance in the Big Ten opener vs Rutgers. In his last game during his junior year, in the Taxslayer Bowl against Georgia he had eleven tackles in a compact fallen short when Penn State lost 24-17 after scoring fourteen unanswered points to pull within a touchdown.

=== Senior year ===
Bell's first appearance as a senior was in the season opener vs Kent State he recorded a tackle and an interception in a 33–13 win. The next week, he had nine tackles in a rivalry game vs Pitt in a 42–39 loss. During the final seconds of the game on a tackle on Pitt’s James Connor, Bell suffered a knee injury sidelining him for the next three weeks. Bell's best performance was a 19 tackle, one sack game vs the Ohio State Buckeyes. The Nittany Lions upset No. 2 Ohio State on a blocked FG attempt and ran it back 64 yards for the touchdown. The win put PSU in the AP Poll for the first time since 2011. There ranking in their Top 25 was No. 24.

On November 26, Bell recorded a tying-season high 18 tackles with 2 tackles for loss in a 45–12 Big Ten East clinching win over Michigan State. And on December 3, 2016 Big Ten Championship 13 tackles, one sack and a forced fumble.

=== Career statistics ===
Year	Team	Tackles							Interceptions					
Year	Team	GP	GS	Tot	Solo	Asst	Sck	FF	Int	YDS	Avg	Lng	TD	PD
2013	Penn State	7	0	24	14	10	0.0	0	0	0	0	0	0	0
2014	Penn State	10	10	43	21	22	2.0	0	1	2	2	2	0	3
2015	Penn State	11	11	56	29	27	3.5	0	1	25	25	25	0	0
2016	Penn State	9	9	88	42	46	4.0	4	1	0	0	0	0	3
Total		37	30	203	106	105	9.5	4	3	27	17	25	0	6

== Professional career ==
=== Cincinnati Bengals ===
Bell signed with the Cincinnati Bengals as an undrafted free agent on May 5, 2017. He was waived on September 2, 2017 and was signed to the practice squad the next day. He was promoted to the active roster on December 15, 2017.

On September 1, 2018, Bell was waived by the Bengals. He was re-signed to the practice squad on October 23, 2018. He was promoted to the active roster on November 16, 2018. He was waived on May 11, 2019.

=== Carolina Panthers ===
On August 19, 2019, Bell was signed by the Carolina Panthers. He was waived during final roster cuts on August 30, 2019.

=== Seattle Dragons ===
Bell was signed by the Seattle Dragons of the XFL on January 6, 2020. He was placed on injured reserve during final roster cuts on January 22, 2020. He had his contract terminated when the league suspended operations on April 10, 2020.
