= Jason Cabinda =

American football player (born 1996)

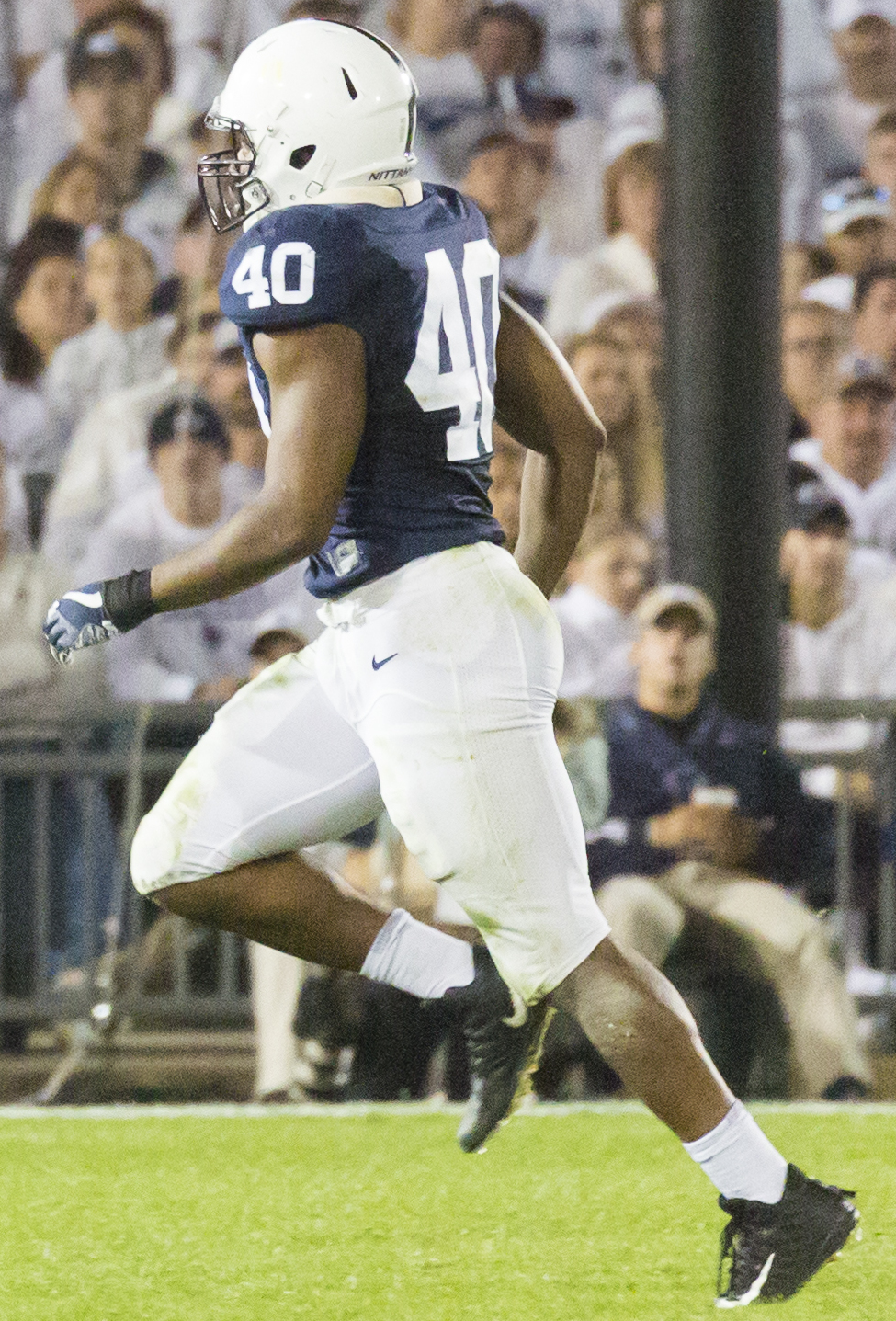
- Cabinda with the Penn State Nittany Lions in 2017

No. 53, 45
- Positions: Linebacker, fullback

Personal information
- Born: March 17, 1996 (age 30); Buena Park, California, U.S.
- Listed height: 6 ft 1 in (1.85 m)
- Listed weight: 235 lb (107 kg)

Career information
- High school: Hunterdon Central Regional (Flemington, New Jersey)
- College: Penn State (2014–2017)
- NFL draft: 2018: undrafted

Career history
- Oakland Raiders (2018); Detroit Lions (2019–2023)

Awards and highlights
- Second-team All-Big Ten (2017); Third-team All-Big Ten (2016)

Career NFL statistics
- Total tackles: 43
- Receptions: 7
- Receiving yards: 29
- Rushing yards: 27
- Return yards: 24
- Total touchdowns: 1
- Stats at Pro Football Reference

Jason W. Cabinda (born March 17, 1996) is an American former professional football player who was a linebacker and fullback in the National Football League (NFL). He played college football for the Penn State Nittany Lions and signed with the Oakland Raiders as an undrafted free agent in 2018.

== Early life ==
Cabinda attended Hunterdon Central Regional High School, where he led the Red Devils to a Central Group V championship in 2013, scoring two touchdowns in the 21–0 victory over Manalapan High School. Notably, he totaled 3,417 yards as a rusher from his sophomore to senior year and scored 47 total touchdowns.

== College career ==
Cabinda played four seasons for the Nittany Lions, playing in 43 games and starting 36 games. He finished his Penn State career ninth all-time in career tackles with 286 and accumulated six career sacks, 16.5 tackles for loss, three forced fumbles, one fumble recovery, 11 passes defensed and one interception. Cabinda was named third-team All-Big Ten Conference by the coaches and honorable mention All-Big Ten by the media in 2016.

=== Statistics ===
Year	Team	Tackles							Interceptions				
Year	Team	G	Tot	Solo	Asst	Sck	FF	Int	YDS	Avg	Lng	TD	PD
2014	Penn State	8	17	7	10	0.0	0	0	0	0	0	0	0
2015	Penn State	13	100	39	61	2.5	1	1	0	0	0	0	5
2016	Penn State	9	81	36	45	1.0	0	0	0	0	0	0	3
2017	Penn State	11	81	28	53	2.0	1	0	0	0	0	0	3
Total		41	279	110	169	5.5	2	1	0	0	0	0	11

== Professional career ==
Pre-draft measurables
Height	Weight	Arm length	Hand span	Wingspan	20-yard shuttle	Three-cone drill	Vertical jump	Broad jump	Bench press
6 ft 1 in (1.85 m)	239 lb (108 kg)	32 in (0.81 m)	9 5/8 in (0.24 m)	6 ft 6 1/8 in (1.98 m)	4.22 s	7.00 s	33.5 in (0.85 m)	10 ft 9 in (3.28 m)	19 reps
All values from NFL Combine/Pro Day

=== Oakland Raiders ===
Cabinda signed with the Oakland Raiders as an undrafted free agent on May 4, 2018. He was waived on September 1, 2018 and was signed to the practice squad the next day. He was promoted to the active roster on October 16, 2018.

On August 31, 2019, Cabinda was waived by the Raiders.

=== Detroit Lions ===
On September 2, 2019, Cabinda was signed to the Detroit Lions practice squad. He was promoted to the active roster on December 3, 2019.

Cabinda was given an exclusive-rights free agent tender by the Lions on March 4, 2021. He signed the one-year contract on April 6.

On February 17, 2022, Cabinda signed a two-year contract extension with the Lions through the 2023 season. He was placed on the reserve/physically unable to perform list to start the season on August 23, 2022. He was activated on November 12.

On October 7, 2023, Cabinda was placed on injured reserve. He was activated from injured reserve and waived on December 29, 2023. He was re-signed to the practice squad on January 2, 2024. Jason Cabinda was resigned to the active roster for week 17. He was not signed to a reserve/future contract after the season and thus became a free agent when his practice squad contract expired.

== Personal life ==
Cabinda has one child. Cabinda's mother hails from Cameroon.

== Broadcasting Career ==
Following his retirement from professional football, Cabinda transitioned into sports media. In July 2026, The CW announced that Cabinda would join its college football broadcast team as the lead booth analyst for Atlantic Coast Conference (ACC) games, working alongside play-by-play announcer Thom Brennaman and sideline analyst Wes Bryant.

Prior to joining The CW, Cabinda worked as an analyst across multiple platforms, including NFL Network, where he appeared on Good Morning Football, and CBS Sports HQ. He also served as an analyst for Penn State football pregame broadcasts.
