= Mike Gesicki =

American football player (born 1995)

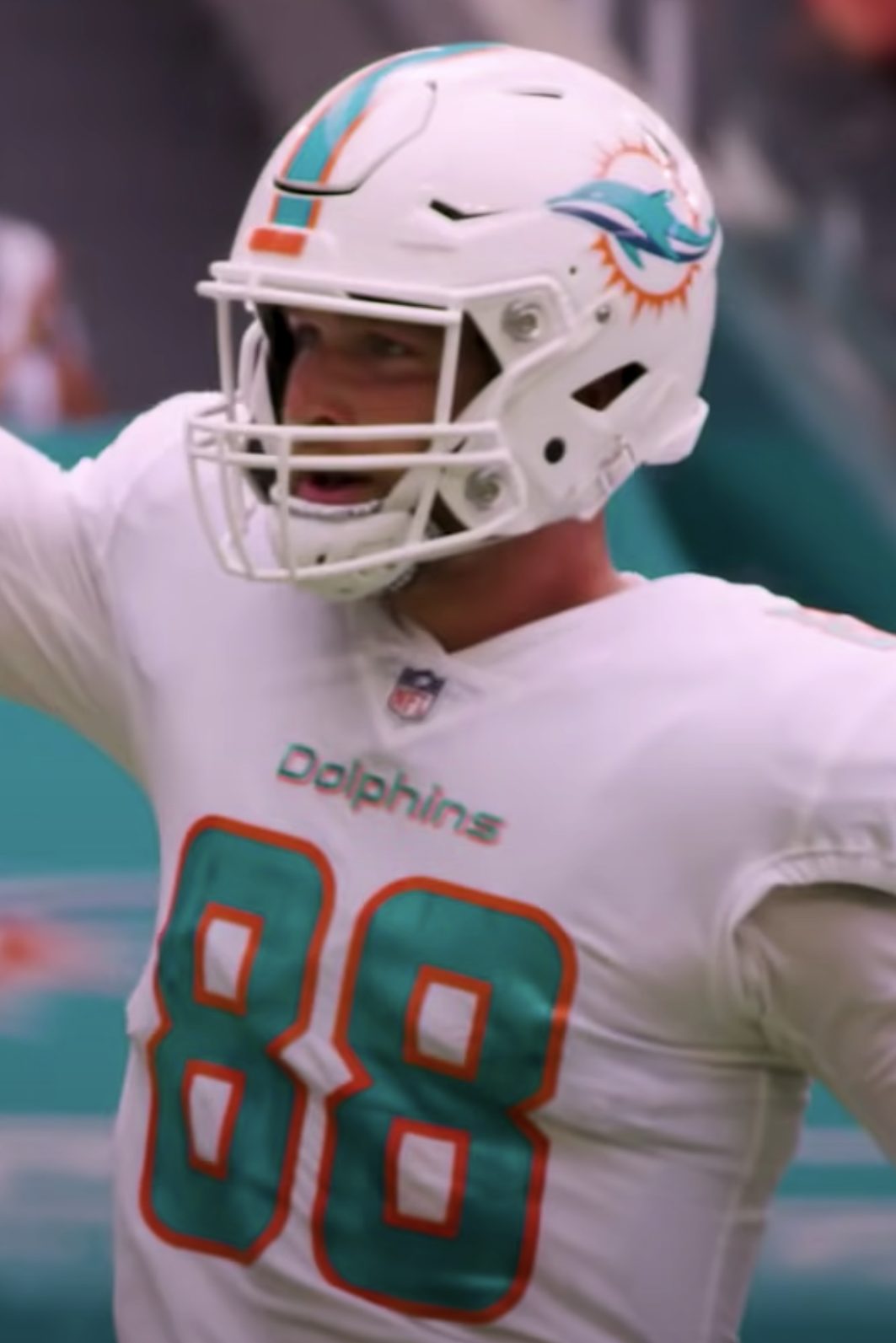
- Gesicki with the Miami Dolphins in 2021

No. 88 – Cincinnati Bengals
- Position: Tight end
- Roster status: Active

Personal information
- Born: October 3, 1995 (age 31); Manahawkin, New Jersey, U.S.
- Listed height: 6 ft 6 in (1.98 m)
- Listed weight: 245 lb (111 kg)

Career information
- High school: Southern Regional (Manahawkin)
- College: Penn State (2014–2017)
- NFL draft: 2018: 2nd round, 42nd overall pick

Career history
- Miami Dolphins (2018–2022); New England Patriots (2023); Cincinnati Bengals (2024–present)

Awards and highlights
- Third-team All-Big Ten (2016)

Career NFL statistics as of 2025
- Receptions: 372
- Receiving yards: 4,085
- Receiving touchdowns: 30
- Stats at Pro Football Reference

Michael William Gesicki (born October 3, 1995) is an American professional football tight end for the Cincinnati Bengals of the National Football League (NFL). He played college football for the Penn State Nittany Lions. He was selected in the second round of the 2018 NFL draft by the Miami Dolphins.

A resident of the Manahawkin section of Stafford Township, New Jersey, Gesicki was a 2014 graduate of Southern Regional High School, where he set school records in basketball scoring (1,866 points), football catches (103) and receiving yards (1,817) and volleyball blocks (519).

== Early life ==
Gesicki attended Southern Regional High School in Stafford Township, New Jersey, where he played football, basketball, and volleyball. He finished his career as the Rams' all-time leading receiver with 1,817 yards on 103 receptions, with 16 touchdown catches.

College recruiting
Name	Hometown	School	Height	Weight	40^{‡}	Commit date
Mike Gesicki; TE	Stafford Township, New Jersey	Southern Regional High School	6 ft 5 in (1.96 m)	215 lb (98 kg)	N/A	Oct 17, 2013
Mike Gesicki; TE	Recruit ratings: Scout: Rivals: 247Sports: (78)					
Overall recruit ranking:
Note: In many cases, Scout, Rivals, 247Sports, On3, and ESPN may conflict in their listings of height and weight.; In these cases, the average was taken. ESPN grades are on a 100-point scale.; Sources: "2013 Team Ranking". Rivals.com.

== College career ==
Gesicki attended and played college football at Penn State from 2014 to 2017. In the Nittany Lions' last three games of the 2016 season, Gesicki scored a receiving touchdown in each game. One of the touchdowns came in the Rose Bowl against #9 USC in a 52–49 loss. Gesicki was named to the John Mackey Award watchlist in July 2017, which is awarded to college football's most outstanding tight end. In the 2017 season, Gesicki had four games with multiple receiving touchdowns. His nine receiving touchdowns on the season ranked tied for third in the Big Ten.

== Professional career ==
Pre-draft measurables
Height	Weight	Arm length	Hand span	Wingspan	40-yard dash	10-yard split	20-yard split	20-yard shuttle	Three-cone drill	Vertical jump	Broad jump	Bench press
6 ft 5 1/2 in (1.97 m)	247 lb (112 kg)	34 1/8 in (0.87 m)	10 1/4 in (0.26 m)	6 ft 10 1/8 in (2.09 m)	4.54 s	1.56 s	2.65 s	4.10 s	6.76 s	41.5 in (1.05 m)	10 ft 9 in (3.28 m)	22 reps
All values from NFL Combine

=== Miami Dolphins ===
The Miami Dolphins selected Gesicki in the second round with the 42nd overall pick in the 2018 NFL draft. Gesicki was the second tight end to be drafted in 2018.

External videos
- Dolphins draft Mike Gesicki 42nd overall

On June 18, 2018, the Miami Dolphins signed Gesicki to a four-year, $6.61 million contract that includes $3.66 million guaranteed and a signing bonus of $2.88 million.

In the Dolphins' 2018 season opener against the Tennessee Titans, Gesicki had a reception for 11 yards in his NFL debut. Gesicki finished his rookie season with 22 receptions for 202 receiving yards.

In Week 12 of the 2019 season, Gesicki recorded his first career receiving touchdown on a 11-yard reception from Ryan Fitzpatrick against the Cleveland Browns. In Week 16, against the Cincinnati Bengals, he had six receptions for 82 receiving yards and two receiving touchdowns in the 38–35 overtime victory. Overall, Gesicki finished the 2019 season with 51 receptions for 570 receiving yards and five receiving touchdowns.

In Week 2 of the 2020 season against the Buffalo Bills, Gesicki finished with eight receptions for 130 yards and his first touchdown of the season. It marked the first time in his NFL career with 100+ receiving yards in a single game, but the Dolphins lost the game 28–31. In Week 14, against the Kansas City Chiefs, he had five receptions for 65 receiving yards and two touchdowns in the 33–27 loss. In the 2020 season, Gesicki finished with 53 receptions for 706 receiving yards and six receiving touchdowns.

In Week 6 of the 2021 season, Gesicki had eight receptions for 115 receiving yards against the Jacksonville Jaguars. In the 2021 season, Gesicki had 73 receptions for 780 receiving yards and two receiving touchdowns.

On March 8, 2022, the Dolphins placed the franchise tag on Gesicki. In Week 6 of the 2022 season, Gesicki had two receiving touchdowns against the Minnesota Vikings. In the 2022 season, Gesicki finished with 32 receptions for 362 receiving yards and five receiving touchdowns in 17 games and one start. In the Wild Card Round against the Bills, he had a receiving touchdown in the 34–31 loss.

=== New England Patriots ===
On March 20, 2023, Gesicki signed with the New England Patriots on a one-year deal worth up to $9 million. He started 10 games, the most in his career, finishing the season with two touchdowns to go with 29 receptions for 244 yards.

=== Cincinnati Bengals ===
On March 14, 2024, Gesicki signed a one-year $2.5 million contract with the Cincinnati Bengals. In Week 9, against the Las Vegas Raiders, he had five receptions for 100 yards and two touchdowns in the win. He had 65 receptions for 665 yards and two touchdowns in the 2024 season.

On March 8, 2025, Gesicki re-signed with Cincinnati on a three-year, $25.5 million contract. On October 15, Gesicki was placed on injured reserve due to a pectoral injury he suffered in Week 6 against the Green Bay Packers. He was activated on November 21, ahead of the team's Week 12 matchup against the New England Patriots. He finished the 2025 season with 28 receptions for 307 yards and two touchdowns.

== Career statistics ==
=== NFL ===
Legend
**Bold**	Career high

==== Regular season ====
Year	Team	Games		Receiving					Fumbles	
Year	Team	GP	GS	Rec	Yds	Avg	Lng	TD	Fum	Lost
2018	MIA	16	7	22	202	9.2	27	0	**1**	**1**
2019	MIA	16	5	51	570	11.2	34	5	**1**	**1**
2020	MIA	15	9	53	703	13.3	**70**	**6**	0	0
2021	MIA	**17**	9	**73**	**780**	10.7	40	2	0	0
2022	MIA	**17**	1	32	362	**11.3**	32	5	0	0
2023	NE	**17**	**10**	29	244	8.4	18	2	0	0
2024	CIN	17	3	65	665	10.2	47	2	**1**	**1**
2025	CIN	13	2	28	307	11.0	37	2	0	0
Total		128	46	353	3,833	10.9	70	24	3	3

==== Postseason ====
Year	Team	Games		Receiving					Fumbles	
Year	Team	GP	GS	Rec	Yds	Avg	Lng	TD	Fum	Lost
2022	MIA	**1**	**0**	**2**	**15**	**7.5**	**8**	**1**	**0**	**0**
Total		1	0	2	15	7.5	8	1	0	0

=== College ===
Season	Team	Conf	GP	Receiving				
Season	Team	Conf	GP	Rec	Yds	Lng	Avg	TD
2014	Penn State	Big Ten	13	11	114	30	10.4	0
2015	Penn State	Big Ten	11	13	125	33	9.6	1
2016	Penn State	Big Ten	**14**	48	**679**	**53**	**14.1**	5
2017	Penn State	Big Ten	13	**57**	563	35	9.9	**9**
Career			51	129	1,481	53	11.7	15
