= 2017 Rose Bowl =

American college football game

2017 Rose Bowl presented by Northwestern Mutual
- CFP New Year's Six; 103rd Rose Bowl Game
USC Trojans	Penn State Nittany Lions
(9–3)	(11–2)
Pac-12	Big Ten
52	49
Head coach: Clay Helton	Head coach: James Franklin
AP / Coaches / CFP; 9 / 9 / 9	AP / Coaches / CFP; 5 / 5 / 5
	1	2	3	4	Total
USC	13	14	8	17	52
Penn State	0	21	28	0	49
- Date: January 2, 2017
- Season: 2016
- Stadium: Rose Bowl
- Location: Pasadena, California
- MVP: Sam Darnold (QB, USC); Stevie Tu'ikolovatu (DT, USC)
- Favorite: USC by 6.5
- National anthem: Blue Band
- Referee: Duane Heydt (ACC)
- Halftime show: Blue Band; Spirit of Troy
- Attendance: 95,128
- Payout: US$35 million to each team

United States TV coverage
- Network: ESPN and ESPN Radio
- Announcers: ESPN: Chris Fowler (play-by-play); Kirk Herbstreit (analyst); Samantha Ponder and Tom Rinaldi (sideline); ESPN Radio: Dave Pasch, Greg McElroy, Tom Luginbill
- Nielsen ratings: 9.4 (16.04 million viewers avg.)

International TV coverage
- Network: ESPN Deportes
- Announcers: Kenneth Garay, Alex Pombo

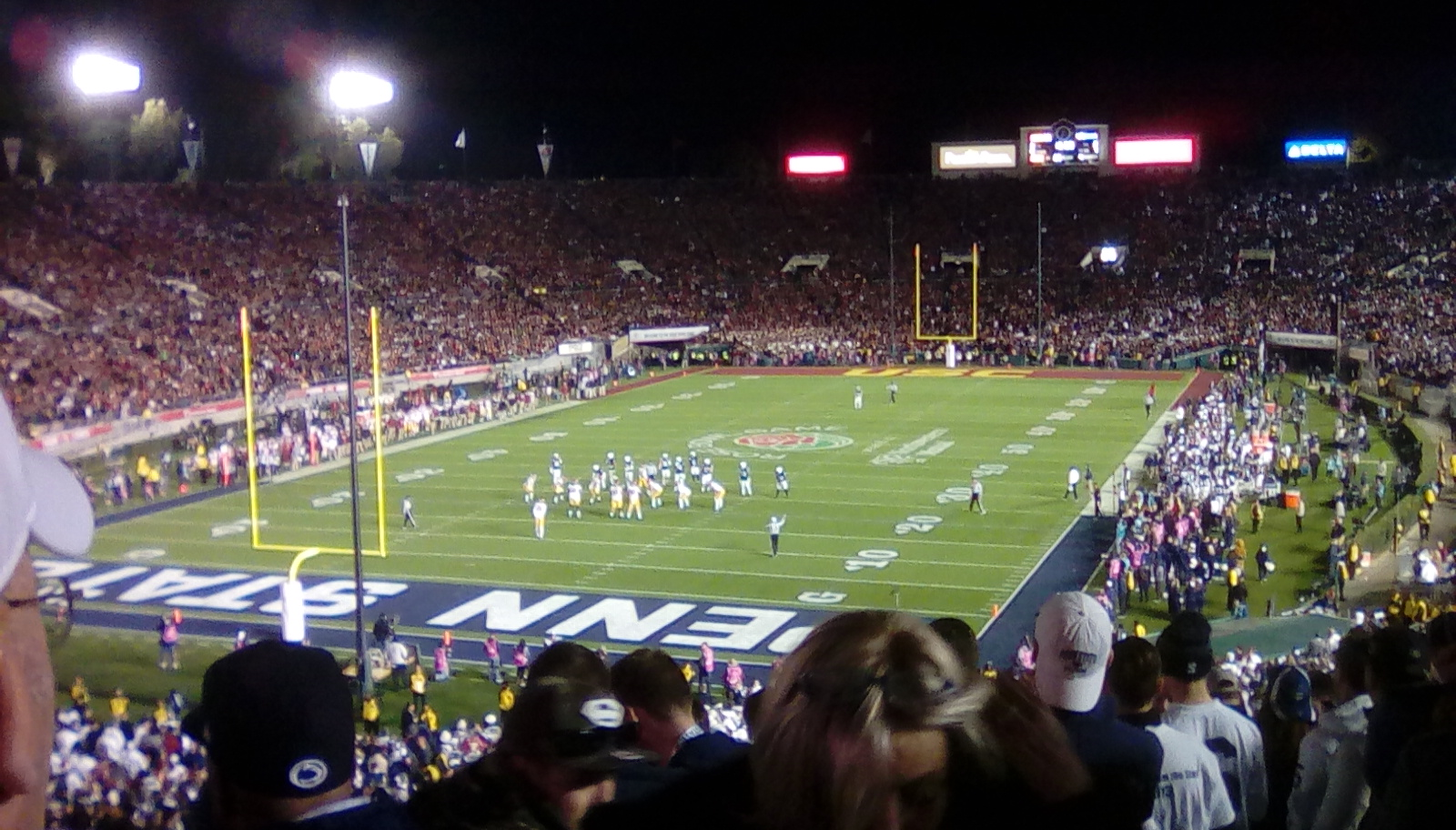
The 2017 Rose Bowl during the game.

The 2017 Rose Bowl was a college football bowl game played on January 2, 2017 at the Rose Bowl stadium in Pasadena, California. This 103rd Rose Bowl Game matched the Big Ten Conference champions Penn State Nittany Lions against the USC Trojans of the Pac-12 Conference, a rematch of the 1923 and 2009 Rose Bowls, the former the first appearance for either team in the bowl and the latter the most recent appearance for either team. It was one of the 2016–17 bowl games that concluded the 2016 FBS football season. Sponsored by the Northwestern Mutual financial services organization, the game was officially known as the Rose Bowl Game presented by Northwestern Mutual. USC received the Lathrop K. Leishman trophy for winning the game.

The contest, played on January 2 in keeping with the game's standard practice when New Year's Day falls on a Sunday, was televised on ESPN with a radio broadcast on ESPN Radio and XM Satellite Radio, which began at 1:30 p.m. (PST) with kickoff at 2:10 p.m. (PST). The Pasadena Tournament of Roses Association was the organizer of the game. The Rose Bowl Game was a contractual sell-out, with 64,500 tickets allocated to the participating teams and conferences. The remaining tickets were distributed to the Tournament of Roses members, sponsors, City of Pasadena residents, and the general public. Ticket prices were $150 and $210. The bowl game was preceded by the 2017 Rose Parade, the 128th annual Rose Parade which began at 8:00 a.m. (PST) on game day with a theme of "Echoes of Success."

== Pre-game activities ==
The game was presided over by the 2017 Rose Queen, the Royal Court, Tournament of Roses President Brad Ratliff, and the grand marshals Janet Evans, Allyson Felix, and Greg Louganis.

After the teams' arrival in Southern California, the teams participated in the traditional Lawry's Beef Bowl in Beverly Hills and the Disney Media Day at the Disneyland Resort in nearby Anaheim. The Rose Bowl Hall of Fame ceremony luncheon was held prior to the game at the Rose Bowl, where outstanding former players and participants were inducted into the hall. This year's honorees were Bobby Bell, from the University of Minnesota; Ricky Ervins, University of Southern California; Tommy Prothro, Oregon State University and UCLA; and Art Spander, award-winning sportswriter.

The bands and cheerleaders from both schools participated in the pre-game Rose Parade on Colorado Boulevard in Pasadena along with the floats.

== Teams ==
The teams playing in the Rose Bowl game were the highest ranking teams from the Pac-12 Conference and Big Ten Conference that were not selected to play in a College Football Playoff semifinal game. The teams were officially selected by the football committee of the Pasadena Tournament of Roses Association on Selection Sunday on December 4, 2016, based on the final rankings by the CFP committee.

=== #9 USC Trojans ===
The Trojans started the year with a dismal 1–3 record, but after a Week 4 loss at No. 24 Utah the Trojans reeled off an eight-game winning streak, including an upset win over No. 4 Washington to break them into the Top 25 where they remained since. USC was led by freshman quarterback Sam Darnold, 1,000-yard rusher Ronald Jones II, receivers JuJu Smith-Schuster, Darreus Rogers and Deontay Burnett, defensive end Porter Gustin, and all-purpose player Adoree Jackson.

They were coached by Clay Helton, who led them to a 9–3 season (after going 5–4 in 9 games as interim head coach the season before). The team wore its white jerseys and used the east bench during the game.

=== #5 Penn State Nittany Lions ===
The Nittany Lions started the season off 2–2 after losses to Pitt and No. 4 Michigan but finished the regular season on a 9–game winning streak, including a pivotal 4th-quarter comeback victory over #2 Ohio State that led to Penn State receiving a Top-25 national ranking for the first time since 2011. Penn State added a Big Ten Championship with a comeback win over #6 Wisconsin to close out the season. The Nittany Lions were led by sophomore duo quarterback Trace McSorley and 1,000+ yard rusher Saquon Barkley and junior wide receiver Chris Godwin.

They came into the game 11–2 (8–1 Big Ten), a big improvement from the last two seasons under head coach James Franklin (finished 7–6 both seasons). The team wore its dark jerseys and used the west bench on game day.

=== Other ===
The Nittany Lions and Trojans had previously played nine times, with USC leading the series 5–4, and had played twice in the Rose Bowl in (1923 and 2009) with USC winning both games. The 2017 match was the highest scoring game in the bowl's history, with a total of 101 points, breaking the record set five years earlier at the 2012 Rose Bowl game. This record was broken in the 2018 Rose Bowl game with 102 points scored by both Oklahoma and Georgia.

== Game summary ==
=== Scoring summary ===
Scoring summary

Quarter	Time	Drive			Team	Scoring information	Score	
Quarter	Time	Plays	Yards	TOP	Team	Scoring information	USC	PSU
1	10:31	5	51	1:44	USC	Deontay Burnett 26-yard touchdown reception from Sam Darnold, Matt Boermeester kick good	7	0
1	4:42	12	53	4:52	USC	22-yard field goal by Matt Boermeester	10	0
1	0:21	10	54	3:00	USC	44-yard field goal by Matt Boermeester	13	0
2	11:44	9	70	3:37	PSU	Saquon Barkley 24-yard touchdown run, Tyler Davis kick good	13	7
2	10:15	5	60	1:29	USC	Deontay Burnett 3-yard touchdown reception from Sam Darnold, Matt Boermeester kick good	20	7
2	8:39	4	71	1:36	PSU	Chris Godwin 30-yard touchdown reception from Trace McSorley, Tyler Davis kick good	20	14
2	6:16	6	75	2:23	USC	Darreus Rogers 3-yard touchdown reception from Sam Darnold, Matt Boermeester kick good	27	14
2	0:54	13	75	5:22	PSU	Mike Gesicki 11-yard touchdown reception from Trace McSorley, Tyler Davis kick good	27	21
3	13:05	1	79	0:17	PSU	Saquon Barkley 79-yard touchdown run, Tyler Davis kick good	27	28
3	11:27	1	72	0:11	PSU	Chris Godwin 72-yard touchdown reception from Trace McSorley, Tyler Davis kick good	27	35
3	10:26	1	3	0:05	PSU	Trace McSorley 3-yard touchdown run, Tyler Davis kick good	27	42
3	6:47	10	65	3:39	USC	JuJu Smith-Schuster 13-yard touchdown reception from Sam Darnold, 2-point pass good (Sam Darnold to Taylor McNamara)	35	42
3	1:55	8	82	4:52	PSU	Saquon Barkley 7-yard touchdown reception from Trace McSorley, Tyler Davis kick good	35	49
4	8:15	10	83	4:29	USC	Ronald Jones 3-yard touchdown run, Matt Boermeester kick good	42	49
4	1:20	3	80	0:39	USC	Deontay Burnett 27-yard touchdown reception from Sam Darnold, Matt Boermeester kick good	49	49
4	0:00	3	5	0:27	USC	46-yard field goal by Matt Boermeester	52	49
"TOP" = time of possession. For other American football terms, see Glossary of American football.							52	49

=== Statistics ===
Statistics	USC	Penn State
First downs	33	23
Plays-yards		
Third-down efficiency	8-15	4-10
Rushes-yards	34-122	33-211
Passing yards	453	254
Passing, Comp-Att-Int	33-54-1	18-29-3
Time of possession	33:21	26:39

== Game notes ==
- Weather: 56 °F (13 °C); Partly Cloudy, wind 5-10 mph E

=== Rose Bowl records ===
In this game, a number of new Rose Bowl records were set.

- USC quarterback Sam Darnold tied or set a number of individual records:
  - Five touchdown passes tied a record for most scores, and set a new record for most passing touchdowns.
  - 36 points became a new individual record (five touchdowns and a two-point conversion).
  - 473 yards in total offense became a new individual record.
- Penn State quarterback Trace McSorley also tied Rose Bowl records:
  - Four touchdown passes and a running touchdown also tied the record for most scores. In the third quarter, first Darnold, then McSorley tied the existing Rose Bowl record for touchdown passes.
  - Three interceptions tied a record for most passes intercepted, shared with nine other Rose Bowl quarterbacks.
- USC receiver Deontay Burnett tied an individual record for most touchdown receptions with three.
- USC kicker Matt Boermeester tied a Rose Bowl record with three field goals made (including the game-winner as time expired).
- The Trojans and Nittany Lions combined for 101 points. The previous record of 83 was set by Oregon and Wisconsin in the Ducks’ 45–38 victory in the 2012 Rose Bowl. This record would later be broken by Oklahoma and Georgia, who scored a combined 102 points in the 2018 Rose Bowl.
- Penn State’s 49 points became a new record for a losing team.
- Penn State’s 28 points in the third quarter are the most scored by a team in a single quarter.
- USC set a Rose Bowl comeback record by overcoming a 14-point deficit in the fourth quarter.

== Related events ==
- Selection Sunday, December 4, 2016
- Disneyland Resort Press Conference
- Lawry's Beef Bowl
- Hall of Fame ceremony, Rose Bowl, January 1, 2017, 12:00 noon
- Rose Bowl Game Public Tailgate, January 2, 2017

== Post-game ==
=== Ratings ===
The 2017 Rose Bowl drew more than 16 million viewers, making it the most-watched non-semifinal New Year’s Six game ever, and one of the most viewed college football games in history. Viewership was up 17% from the prior year’s 2016 Rose Bowl game between Stanford and Iowa. The telecast peaked at 19,656,000 viewers in the final minutes of the fourth quarter, which included USC’s game-winning field goal. Locally, Philadelphia (16.7) set a market record for the game, while in Pittsburgh (17.0) and Los Angeles (14.9) made it was the second highest-rated bowl game ever on ESPN.

Figures do not include the 300,000 who streamed coverage on WatchESPN or other International streaming websites. If these figures were added to the final rating it would have been near the 19 million viewership range. Some countries who streamed the game on a national tv broadcast include Canada (1.3 million), France (200,000) and Australia (98,000).
