= 2024 Virginia Tech Hokies football team =

American college football season

2024 Virginia Tech Hokies football

Duke's Mayo Bowl, L 10–24 vs. Minnesota
- Conference: Atlantic Coast Conference
- Record: 6–7 (4–4 ACC)
- Head coach: Brent Pry (3rd season)
- Offensive coordinator: Tyler Bowen (3rd season)
- Offensive scheme: Multiple
- Defensive coordinator: Chris Marve (3rd season)
- Base defense: 4–3
- Home stadium: Lane Stadium

2024 Atlantic Coast Conference football standings
	Conf.			Overall
Team	W		L	W		L
No. 12 SMU y^	8	–	0	11	–	3
No. 14 Clemson y$^	7	–	1	10	–	4
No. 18 Miami (FL)	6	–	2	10	–	3
No. 20 Syracuse	5	–	3	10	–	3
Duke	5	–	3	9	–	4
Louisville	5	–	3	9	–	4
Georgia Tech	5	–	3	7	–	6
Boston College	4	–	4	7	–	6
Virginia Tech	4	–	4	6	–	7
Pittsburgh	3	–	5	7	–	6
NC State	3	–	5	6	–	7
North Carolina	3	–	5	6	–	7
Virginia	3	–	5	5	–	7
California	2	–	6	6	–	7
Wake Forest	2	–	6	4	–	8
Stanford	2	–	6	3	–	9
Florida State	1	–	7	2	–	10
Championship: Clemson 34, SMU 31
^ – College Football Playoff participant; $ – Conference champion; y – Championship game participant; Rankings from AP Poll

The 2024 Virginia Tech Hokies football team represented Virginia Tech as a member of the Atlantic Coast Conference (ACC) during the 2024 NCAA Division I FBS football season. Led by third-year head coach Brent Pry, the Hokies played their home games at Lane Stadium on the Campus of Virginia Tech in Blacksburg, Virginia.

== Schedule ==
Radio: Virginia Tech Sports Network

Date	Time	Opponent	Site	TV	Result	Attendance
August 31	12:00 p.m.	at Vanderbilt*	FirstBank Stadium; Nashville, TN	ESPN	L 27–34 ^{OT}	28,934
September 7	4:30 p.m.	Marshall*	Lane Stadium; Blacksburg, VA	The CW	W 31–14	65,632
September 14	6:00 p.m.	at Old Dominion*	S.B. Ballard Stadium; Norfolk, VA	ESPN+	W 37–17	22,208
September 21	3:30 p.m.	Rutgers*	Lane Stadium; Blacksburg, VA	ACCN	L 23–26	65,632
September 27	7:30 p.m.	at No. 7 Miami (FL)	Hard Rock Stadium; Miami Gardens, FL (rivalry)	ESPN	L 34–38	59,539
October 5	3:30 p.m.	at Stanford	Stanford Stadium; Stanford, CA	ACCN	W 31–7	36,277
October 17	7:30 p.m.	Boston College	Lane Stadium; Blacksburg, VA (rivalry)	ESPN	W 42–21	65,632
October 26	12:00 p.m.	Georgia Tech^{†}	Lane Stadium; Blacksburg, VA (rivalry)	ACCN	W 21–6	65,632
November 2	12:00 p.m.	at Syracuse	JMA Wireless Dome; Syracuse, NY	The CW	L 31–38 ^{OT}	38,454
November 9	3:30 p.m.	No. 23 Clemson	Lane Stadium; Blacksburg, VA	ESPN	L 14–24	65,632
November 23	8:00 p.m.	at Duke	Wallace Wade Stadium; Durham, NC	ACCN	L 28–31	22,462
November 30	8:00 p.m.	Virginia	Lane Stadium; Blacksburg, VA (rivalry)	ACCN	W 37–17	65,632
January 3, 2025	7:30 p.m.	vs. Minnesota*	Bank of America Stadium; Charlotte, NC (Duke's Mayo Bowl)	ESPN	L 10–24	31,927
*Non-conference game; ^{†}Homecoming; Rankings from AP Poll (and CFP Rankings, after October 31) - Released prior to game; All times are in Eastern time; Source:

== Game summaries ==
=== at Vanderbilt ===
Virginia Tech Hokies (0–0) at Vanderbilt Commodores (0–0) – Game summary

Quarter	1	2	3	4	OT	Total
Hokies	0	3	10	14	0	27
Commodores	3	14	3	7	7	34

at FirstBank Stadium • Nashville, TN

- Date: August 31, 2024
- Game time: 12:00 p.m.
- Game weather: Sunny • Temperature: 88 °F (31 °C) • Wind: W at 2 miles per hour (3.2 km/h)
- Game attendance: 28,934
- Referee: Stuart Mullins
- TV announcers (ESPN): Roy Philpott (play-by-play), Sam Acho (analyst), and Taylor Davis (sideline)

Game information

First quarter

- (8:27) VAN – Brock Taylor 43-yard field goal (Drive: 11 plays, 50 yards, 6:33; Vanderbilt 3–0)

Second quarter

- (14:54) VAN – Quincy Skinner Jr. 14-yard pass from Diego Pavia, Brock Taylor kick (Drive: 7 plays, 27 yards, 4:09; Vanderbilt 10–0)
- (5:18) VAN – Sedrick Alexander 7-yard run, Brock Taylor kick (Drive: 11 plays, 80 yards, 7:14; Vanderbilt 17–0)
- (0:52) VT – John Love 40-yard field goal (Drive: 13 plays, 44 yards, 4:26; Vanderbilt 17–3)

Third quarter

- (12:42) VT – Bhayshul Tuten 24-yard run, John Love kick (Drive: 6 plays, 83 yards, 2:18; Vanderbilt 17–10)
- (7:07) VAN – Brock Taylor 53-yard field goal (Drive: 9 plays, 40 yards, 5:35; Vanderbilt 20–10)
- (0:34) VT – John Love 38-yard field goal (Drive: 7 plays, 50 yards, 2:57; Vanderbilt 20–13)

Fourth quarter

- (10:12) VT – Bhayshul Tuten 11-yard pass from Kyron Drones, John Love kick (Drive: 7 plays, 76 yards, 2:58; Tied 20–20)
- (4:21) VT – Ali Jennings 62-yard pass from Kyron Drones, John Love kick (Drive: 6 plays, 97 yards, 3:17; Virginia Tech 27–20)
- (1:51) VAN – Sedrick Alexander 8-yard pass from Diego Pavia, Brock Taylor kick (Drive: 6 plays, 70 yards, 2:30; Tied 27–27)

Overtime

- (0:00) VAN – Diego Pavia 4-yard run, Brock Taylor kick (Drive: 4 plays, 25 yards, 0:00; Vanderbilt 34–27)

Statistics	VT	VAN
First downs	21	20
Total yards	397	371
Rushing yards	75	181
Passing yards	322	190
Passing: Comp–Att–Int	22–33–1	12–16–0
Time of possession	25:28	34:32

Team	Category	Player	Statistics
Virginia Tech	Passing	Kyron Drones	22/33, 322 yards 2 TD, INT
Virginia Tech	Rushing	Bhayshul Tuten	9 carries, 34 yards, TD
Virginia Tech	Receiving	Ali Jennings	2 receptions, 91 yards, TD
Vanderbilt	Passing	Diego Pavia	12/16, 190 yards, 2 TD
Vanderbilt	Rushing	Diego Pavia	26 carries, 104 yards, TD
Vanderbilt	Receiving	Quincy Skinner Jr.	4 receptions, 72 yards, TD

=== vs Marshall ===
Marshall Thundering Herd (1–0) vs Virginia Tech Hokies (0–1) – Game summary

Quarter	1	2	3	4	Total
Thundering Herd	0	7	7	0	14
Hokies	7	3	14	7	31

at Lane Stadium • Blacksburg, VA

- Date: September 7, 2024
- Game time: 4:30 pm
- Game weather: Sunny • Temperature: 70 °F (21 °C)
- Game attendance: 65,632
- Referee: Justin Elliot
- TV announcers (The CW): Thom Brennaman (play-by-play), Max Browne (analyst), and Treavor Scales (sideline)

Game information

First quarter

- (0:00) VT – Jaylin Lane 58 yard punt return, John Love kick (Virginia Tech 7–0)

Second quarter

- (6:22) VT – John Love 42 yard field goal (Drive: 8 plays, 10 yards, 4:24; Virginia Tech 10–0)
- (3:19) MRSH – Ethan Payne 2 yard run, Rece Verhoff kick (Drive: 1 play, 5 yards, 0:09; Virginia Tech 10–7)

Third quarter

- (8:02) VT – Bhayshul Tuten 1 yard run, John Love kick (Drive: 12 plays, 50 yards, 6:33; Virginia Tech 17–7)
- (7:16) MRSH – Christian Fitzpatrick 18 yard pass from Stone Earle, Rece Verhoff kick (Drive: 2 plays, 87 yards, 0:46; Virginia Tech 17–14)
- (4:15) VT – Kyron Drones 3 yard run, John Love kick (Drive: 6 plays, 65 yards, 3:01; Virginia Tech 24–14)

Fourth quarter

- (14:14) VT – Da'Quan Felton 5 yard pass from Kyron Drones, John Love kick (Drive: 6 plays, 56 yards, 2:45; Virginia Tech 31–14)

Statistics	MRSH	VT
First downs	12	20
Total yards	278	338
Rushing yards	147	208
Passing yards	131	130
Passing: Comp–Att–Int	13-36-1	14-21-0
Time of possession	23:35	36:25

Team	Category	Player	Statistics
Marshall	Passing	Stone Earle	13/36, 131 yards, 1 TD, 1 INT
Marshall	Rushing	A.J. Turner	6 carries, 103 yards
Marshall	Receiving	Christian Fitzpatrick	4 receptions, 73 yards, 1 TD
Virginia Tech	Passing	Kyron Drones	14/21, 130 yards, 1 TD
Virginia Tech	Rushing	Bhayshul Tuten	22 carries, 120 yards, 1 TD
Virginia Tech	Receiving	Stephen Gosnell	2 receptions, 54 yards

=== at Old Dominion ===
Virginia Tech Hokies (1–1) at Old Dominion Monarchs (0–2) – Game summary

Quarter	1	2	3	4	Total
Hokies	14	0	6	17	37
Monarchs	0	10	0	7	17

at S.B. Ballard Stadium • Norfolk, VA

- Date: September 14, 2024
- Game time: 6:00 pm
- Game weather: Cloudy • Temperature: 75 °F (24 °C) • Wind: NE at 15 miles per hour (24 km/h)
- Game attendance: 22,208
- TV announcers (ESPN+): Chip Tarkenton (play-by-play) and Andy Mashaw (analyst)

Game information

First quarter

- (12:05) VT – Jaylin Lane 25-yard pass from Kyron Drones, John Love kick (Drive: 7 plays, 76 yards, 2:51; Virginia Tech 7–0)
- (5:50) VT – Kyron Drones 1-yard run, John Love kick (Drive: 7 plays, 80 yards, 3:29; Virginia Tech 14–0)

Second quarter

- (13:13) ODU – Quinn Henicle 65-yard run, Ethan Sanchez kick (Drive: 1 play, 65 yards, 0:10; Virginia Tech 14–7)
- (5:14) ODU – Ethan Sanchez 28-yard field goal (Drive: 6 plays, 69 yards, 2:50; Virginia Tech 14–10)

Third quarter

- (10:43) VT – John Love 21-yard field goal (Drive: 6 plays, 68 yards, 2:55; Virginia Tech 17–10)
- (8:07) VT – John Love 32-yard field goal (Drive: 4 plays, 3 yards, 1:05; Virginia Tech 20–10)

Fourth quarter

- (14:55) VT – Bhayshul Tuten 16-yard run, John Love kick (Drive: 8 plays, 59 yards, 4:16; Virginia Tech 27–10)
- (10:10) VT – Bhayshul Tuten 22-yard run, John Love kick (Drive: 7 plays, 48 yards, 3:51; Virginia Tech 34–10)
- (5:08) VT – John Love 41-yard field goal (Drive: 7 plays, 18 yards, 3:53; Virginia Tech 37–10)
- (3:32) ODU – Tariq Sims 16-yard run, Ethan Sanchez kick (Drive: 6 plays, 75 yards, 1:36; Virginia Tech 37–17)

Statistics	VT	ODU
First downs	22	11
Total yards	465	293
Rushing yards	289	243
Passing yards	176	50
Passing: Comp–Att–Int	15–26–1	6–14–1
Time of possession	37:50	22:10

Team	Category	Player	Statistics
Virginia Tech	Passing	Kyron Drones	15/26, 176 yards, 1 TD, 1 INT
Virginia Tech	Rushing	Kyron Drones	12 carries, 117 yards, 1 TD
Virginia Tech	Receiving	Jaylin Lane	7 receptions, 106 yards, 1TD
Old Dominion	Passing	Quinn Henicle	5/12, 38 yards, 1 INT
Old Dominion	Rushing	Bryce Duke	4 carries, 85 yards
Old Dominion	Receiving	Isiah Paige	2 receptions, 18 yards

=== vs Rutgers ===
Rutgers Scarlet Knights (2–0) vs Virginia Tech Hokies (2–1) – Game summary

Quarter	1	2	3	4	Total
Scarlet Knights	14	2	7	3	26
Hokies	0	7	0	16	23

at Lane Stadium • Blacksburg, VA

- Date: September 21, 2024
- Game time: 3:30 p.m.
- Game weather: Sunny • Temperature: 81 °F (27 °C) • Wind: SE at 3 miles per hour (4.8 km/h)
- Game attendance: 65,632
- Referee: Tim O'Dey
- TV announcers (ACCN): Chris Cotter (play-by-play), Mark Herzlich (analyst), and Coley Harvey (sideline)

Game information

First quarter

- (7:41) RU – Kyle Monangai 1-yard run, Jai Patel kick (Drive: 9 plays, 31 yards, 4:40; Rutgers 7–0)
- (0:58) RU – Samuel Brown V 3-yard run, Jai Patel kick (Drive: 6 plays, 61 yards, 2:52; Rutgers 14–0)

Second quarter

- (13:00) VT – Bhayshul Tuten 23-yard run, John Love kick (Drive: 8 plays, 75 yards, 2:59; Rutgers 14–7)
- (2:00) RU – Wesley Bailey 0-yard safety (Rutgers 16–7)

Third quarter

- (10:44) RU – Samuel Brown V 5-yard run, Jai Patel kick (Drive: 8 plays, 75 yards, 4:16; Rutgers 23–7)

Fourth quarter

- (14:06) VT – Bhayshul Tuten 14-yard run, Benji Gosnell pass (Drive: 2 plays, 39 yards, 0:33; Rutgers 23–15)
- (4:35) VT – Bhayshul Tuten 2-yard run, Stephen Gosnell pass (Drive: 8 plays, 80 yards, 4:16; Tied 23–23)
- (1:56) RU – Jai Patel 24-yard field goal (Drive: 5 plays, 68 yards, 2:39; Rutgers 26–23)

Statistics	RUTG	VT
First downs	25	14
Total yards	422	320
Rushing yards	153	183
Passing yards	269	137
Passing: Comp–Att–Int	16–25–0	13–27–1
Time of possession	39:23	20:37

Team	Category	Player	Statistics
Rutgers	Passing	Athan Kaliakmanis	16/25, 269 yards
Rutgers	Rushing	Kyle Monangai	26 carries, 84 yards, TD
Rutgers	Receiving	Ian Strong	4 receptions, 110 yards
Virginia Tech	Passing	Kyron Drones	13/27, 137 yards, INT
Virginia Tech	Rushing	Bhayshul Tuten	15 carries, 122 yards, 3 TD
Virginia Tech	Receiving	Jaylin Lane	2 receptions, 38 yards

=== at No. 7 Miami (FL) (rivalry) ===
Virginia Tech Hokies (2–2) at No. 7 Miami Hurricanes (4–0) – Game summary

Quarter	1	2	3	4	Total
Hokies	7	17	3	7	34
No. 7 Hurricanes	14	3	7	14	38

at Hard Rock Stadium • Miami Gardens, FL

- Date: September 27, 2024
- Game time: 7:30 pm
- Game attendance: 59,539
- TV announcers (ESPN): Anish Shroff (play-by-play), Andre Ware (analyst), and Paul Carcaterra (sideline)

Game information

First quarter

- (12:47) VT – Benji Gosnell 25-yard pass from Kyron Drones, John Love kick (Drive: 3 plays, 31 yards, 1:21; Virginia Tech 7–0)
- (10:05) MIA – Jacolby George 18-yard pass from Cam Ward, Andres Borregales kick (Drive: 5 plays, 73 yards, 2:42; Tied 7–7)
- (8:19) MIA – Elijah Arroyo 43-yard pass from Cam Ward, Andres Borregales kick (Drive: 3 plays, 52 yards, 0:59; Miami 14–7)

Second quarter

- (11:59) VT – Bhayshul Tuten 55-yard run, John Love kick (Drive: 3 plays, 64 yards, 1:18; Tied 14–14)
- (5:25) VT – Jaylin Lane 20-yard run, John Love kick (Drive: 5 plays, 69 yards, 2:30; Virginia Tech 21–14)
- (0:20) VT – John Love 57-yard field goal (Drive: 9 plays, 34 yards, 2:10; Virginia Tech 24–14)
- (0:00) MIA – Andres Borregales 56-yard field goal (Drive: 2 plays, 15 yards, 0:20; Virginia Tech 24–17)

Third quarter

- (10:33) VT – John Love 52-yard field goal (Drive: 8 plays, 41 yards, 4:27; Virginia Tech 27–17)
- (2:18) MIA – Cam Ward 17-yard run, Andres Borregales kick (Drive: 8 plays, 89 yards, 3:32; Virginia Tech 27–24)

Fourth quarter

- (12:05) VT – Ayden Greene 16-yard pass from Kyron Drones, John Love kick (Drive: 10 plays, 45 yards, 5:13; Virginia Tech 34–24)
- (8:40) MIA – Cam McCormick 6-yard pass from Cam Ward, Andres Borregales kick (Drive: 9 plays, 70 yards, 3:25; Virginia Tech 34–31)
- (1:57) MIA – Isaiah Horton 1-yard pass from Cam Ward, Andres Borregales kick (Drive: 10 plays, 57 yards, 5:50; Miami 38–34)

Statistics	VT	MIA
First downs	23	24
Total yards	394	508
Rushing yards	206	165
Passing yards	188	343
Passing: Comp–Att–Int	20–34–1	24–38–2
Time of possession	26:18	33:42

Team	Category	Player	Statistics
Virginia Tech	Passing	Kyron Drones	19/33, 189 yards, 2 TD, INT
Virginia Tech	Rushing	Bhayshul Tuten	19 carries, 141 yards, TD
Virginia Tech	Receiving	Stephen Gosnell	4 receptions, 53 yards
Miami (FL)	Passing	Cam Ward	24/38, 343 yards, 4 TD, 2 INT
Miami (FL)	Rushing	Damien Martinez	14 carries, 60 yards
Miami (FL)	Receiving	Elijah Arroyo	2 receptions, 88 yards, TD

=== at Stanford ===
Virginia Tech Hokies (2–3) at Stanford Cardinal (2–2) – Game summary

Quarter	1	2	3	4	Total
Hokies	7	7	7	10	31
Cardinal	0	0	7	0	7

at Stanford Stadium • Stanford, CA

- Date: October 5, 2024
- Game time: 3:30 p.m.
- Game weather: Sunny • Temperature: 89 °F (32 °C) • Wind: N 2 miles per hour (3.2 km/h)
- Game attendance: 36,277
- Referee: Gary Patterson
- TV announcers (ACCN): Chris Cotter (play-by-play), Mark Herzlich (analyst), and Coley Harvey (sideline)

Game information

First quarter

- (6:33) VT – Stephen Gosnell 9-yard pass from Kyron Drones, John Love kick (Drive: 7 plays, 65 yards, 2:53; Virginia Tech 7–0)

Second quarter

- (1:54) VT – Bhayshul Tuten 7-yard run, John Love kick (Drive: 13 plays, 88 yards, 6:45; Virginia Tech 14–0)

Third quarter

- (13:01) VT – Da'Quan Felton 55-yard pass from Kyron Drones, John Love kick (Drive: 4 plays, 75 yards, 1:59; Virginia Tech 21–0)
- (1:00) STAN – Elic Ayomanor 19-yard pass from Micah Ford, Emmet Kenney kick (Drive: 12 plays, 80 yards, 7:16; Virginia Tech 21–7)

Fourth quarter

- (7:28) VT – Kyron Drones 2-yard run, John Love kick (Drive: 7 plays, 35 yards, 3:28; Virginia Tech 28–7)
- (2:33) VT – John Love 46-yard field goal (Drive: 8 plays, 31 yards, 3:55; Virginia Tech 31–7)

Statistics	VT	STAN
First downs	16	18
Total yards	337	258
Rushing yards	136	136
Passing yards	201	122
Passing: Comp–Att–Int	14–19–0	14–25–1
Time of possession	26:52	33:08

Team	Category	Player	Statistics
Virginia Tech	Passing	Kyron Drones	14/19, 201 yards, 2 TD
Virginia Tech	Rushing	Bhayshul Tuten	21 carries, 73 yards, TD
Virginia Tech	Receiving	Da'Quan Felton	4 receptions, 84 yards, TD
Stanford	Passing	Justin Lamson	13/24, 103 yards, INT
Stanford	Rushing	Chris Davis Jr.	8 carries, 47 yards
Stanford	Receiving	Elic Ayomanor	8 receptions, 33 yards, TD

=== vs Boston College (rivalry) ===
Boston College Eagles (4–2) vs Virginia Tech Hokies (3–3) – Game summary

Quarter	1	2	3	4	Total
Eagles	0	0	21	0	21
Hokies	14	14	0	14	42

at Lane Stadium • Blacksburg, VA

- Date: October 17, 2024
- Game time: 7:30 pm
- Game weather: Sunny • Temperature: 48 °F (9 °C) • Wind: NW 1 mile per hour (1.6 km/h)
- Game attendance: 65,632
- Referee: Justin Elliott
- TV announcers (ESPN): Matt Barrie (play-by-play), Dan Mullen (analyst), and Harry Lyles Jr. (sideline)

Game information

First quarter

- (6:15) VT – Kyron Drones 11-yard run, John Love kick (Drive: 11 plays, 88 yards, 5:44; Virginia Tech 7–0)
- (3:06) VT – Kyron Drones 1-yard run, John Love kick (Drive: 4 plays, 19 yards, 1:42; Virginia Tech 14–0)

Second quarter

- (12:40) VT – Bhayshul Tuten 83-yard run, John Love kick (Drive: 2 plays, 94 yards, 0:46; Virginia Tech 21–0)
- (0:11) VT – Bhayshul Tuten 20-yard pass from Kyron Drones, John Love kick (Drive: 6 plays, 85 yards, 1:04; Virginia Tech 28–0)

Third quarter

- (8:48) BC – Treshaun Ward 25-yard pass from Thomas Castellanos, Liam Connor kick (Drive: 6 plays, 80 yards, 3:11; Virginia Tech 28–7)
- (6:07) BC – Jeremiah Franklin 11-yard pass from Thomas Castellanos, Liam Connor kick (Drive: 4 plays, 29 yards, 2:04; Virginia Tech 28–14)
- (2:55) BC – Kye Robichaux 5-yard run, Liam Connor kick (Drive: 6 plays, 18 yards, 2:59; Virginia Tech 28–21)

Fourth quarter

- (11:02) VT – Bhayshul Tuten 6-yard run, John Love kick (Drive: 3 plays, 49 yards, 1:26; Virginia Tech 35–21)
- (8:28) VT – Bhayshul Tuten 61-yard run, John Love kick (Drive: 1 play, 51 yards, 0:10; Virginia Tech 42–21)

Statistics	BC	VT
First downs	22	22
Total yards	372	532
Rushing yards	167	368
Passing yards	205	164
Passing: Comp–Att–Int	17–26–0	14–18–1
Time of possession	33:34	26:26

Team	Category	Player	Statistics
Boston College	Passing	Thomas Castellanos	17/26, 205 yards, 2 TD
Boston College	Rushing	Turbo Richard	9 carries, 64 yards
Boston College	Receiving	Jeremiah Franklin	3 receptions, 49 yards, TD
Virginia Tech	Passing	Kyron Drones	14/18, 164 yards, TD, INT
Virginia Tech	Rushing	Bhayshul Tuten	18 carries, 266 yards, 3 TD
Virginia Tech	Receiving	Benji Gosnell	4 receptions, 49 yards

=== vs. Georgia Tech (rivalry) ===
Game Eight – Georgia Tech Yellow Jackets (5–3) vs Virginia Tech Hokies (4–3) – Game summary

Quarter	1	2	3	4	Total
Yellow Jackets	3	3	0	0	6
Hokies	0	14	7	0	21

at Lane Stadium • Blacksburg, VA

- Date: Saturday October 26, 2024
- Game time: 12:00 p.m.
- Game weather: Cloudy • Temperature: 65 °F (18 °C) • Wind: W 6 miles per hour (9.7 km/h)
- Game attendance: 65,632
- Referee: Stuart Mullins
- TV announcers (ACCN): Chris Cotter (play-by-play), Mark Herzlich (analyst), and Coley Harvey (sideline)

Game information

First quarter

- (7:00) GT – Aidan Birr 34-yard field goal (Drive: 12 plays, 59 yards, 5:52; Georgia Tech 3–0)

Second quarter

- (13:02) VT – Benji Gosnell 20-yard pass from Kyron Drones, John Love kick (Drive: 4 plays, 72 yards, 1:46; Virginia Tech 7–3)
- (5:39) GT – Aidan Birr 51-yard field goal (Drive: 9 plays, 36 yards, 3:51; Virginia Tech 7–6)
- (1:51) VT – Kyron Drones 6-yard pass from Jaylin Lane, John Love kick (Drive: 9 plays, 75 yards, 3:48; Virginia Tech 14–6)

Third quarter

- (4:50) VT – Kyron Drones 1-yard run, John Love kick (Drive: 5 plays, 42 yards, 1:46; Virginia Tech 21–6)

Fourth quarter

No scoring plays

Statistics	GT	VT
First downs	17	11
Total yards	356	233
Rushing yards	96	99
Passing yards	260	134
Passing: Comp–Att–Int	21–48–2	17–28–0
Time of possession	32:03	27:57

Team	Category	Player	Statistics
Georgia Tech	Passing	Aaron Philo	11/26, 184 yards, INT
Georgia Tech	Rushing	Jamal Haynes	18 carries, 47 yards
Georgia Tech	Receiving	Malik Rutherford	6 receptions, 53 yards
Virginia Tech	Passing	Kyron Drones	16/27, 128 yards, TD
Virginia Tech	Rushing	Bhayshul Tuten	17 carries, 79 yards
Virginia Tech	Receiving	Benji Gosnell	5 receptions, 59 yards, TD

=== at Syracuse ===
Virginia Tech Hokies (5–3) at Syracuse Orange (5–2) – Game summary

Quarter	1	2	3	4	OT	Total
Hokies	14	0	7	10	0	31
Orange	0	3	15	13	7	38

at JMA Wireless Dome • Syracuse, NY

- Date: November 2, 2024
- Game time: 12:00 p.m.
- Game weather: None (played indoors)
- Game attendance: 38,454
- Referee: Marcus Woods
- TV announcers (The CW): Thom Brennaman (play-by-play), Max Browne (analyst), and Treavor Scales (sideline)

Game information

First quarter

- (8:45) VT – Jaylin Lane 7-yard run, John Love kick (Drive: 7 plays, 80 yards, 3:43; Virginia Tech 7–0)
- (4:31) VT – Collin Schlee 1-yard run, John Love kick (Drive: 7 plays, 73 yards, 3:19; Virginia Tech 14–0)

Second quarter

- (14:56) SYR – Jackson Kennedy 44-yard field goal (Drive: 11 plays, 66 yards, 4:30; Virginia Tech 14–7)

Third quarter

- (7:44) VT – Ali Jennings 12-yard pass from Collin Schlee, John Love kick (Drive: 10 plays, 76 yards, 5:38; Virginia Tech 21–7)
- (6:08) SYR – Kyle McCord 55-yard pass from Kyle McCord, Jackson Kennedy kick (Drive: 4 plays, 75 yards, 1:36; Virginia Tech 21–10)
- (2:53) SYR – LeQuint Allen 1-yard run, Kyle McCord pass (Drive: 6 plays, 56 yards, 2:34; Virginia Tech 21–18)

Fourth quarter

- (14:22) SYR – Justus Ross-Simmons 28-yard pass from Kyle McCord (Drive: 5 plays, 39 yards, 1:23; Syracuse 24–21)
- (11:04) VT – Malachi Thomas 15-yard run, John Love kick (Drive: 8 plays, 75 yards, 3:18; Virginia Tech 28–24)
- (5:16) VT – John Love 27-yard field goal (Drive: 8 plays, 28 yards, 4:16; Virginia Tech 31–24)
- (0:29) SYR – LeQuint Allen 1-yard run, Jackson Kennedy kick (Drive: 14 plays, 75 yards, 4:47; Tied 31–31)

Overtime

- (0:00) SYR – LeQuint Allen 1-yard run, Jackson Kennedy kick (Drive: 2 plays, 25 yards, 0:00; Syracuse 38–31)

Statistics	VT	SYR
First downs	24	23
Total yards	455	410
Rushing yards	249	130
Passing yards	206	280
Passing: Comp–Att–Int	16–24–0	24–36–1
Time of possession	34:18	25:42

Team	Category	Player	Statistics
Virginia Tech	Passing	Collin Schlee	16/24, 206 yards, TD
Virginia Tech	Rushing	Jeremiah Coney	9 carries, 96 yards
Virginia Tech	Receiving	Stephen Gosnell	5 receptions, 118 yards
Syracuse	Passing	Kyle McCord	24/35, 280 yards, 2 TD, INT
Syracuse	Rushing	LeQuint Allen	21 carries, 121 yards, 3 TD
Syracuse	Receiving	Justus Ross-Simmons	4 receptions, 88 yards, 2 TD

=== vs No. 23 Clemson ===
No. 23 Clemson Tigers (6–2) vs Virginia Tech Hokies (5–4) – Game summary

Quarter	1	2	3	4	Total
No. 23 Tigers	0	0	14	10	24
Hokies	0	7	0	7	14

at Lane Stadium • Blacksburg, VA

- Date: November 9, 2024
- Game time: 3:30 p.m.
- Game weather: Temperature: 62 °F (17 °C) • Wind: E 7 mph • Weather: Sunny
- Game attendance: 65,632
- Referee: Jerry Magallanes
- TV announcers (ESPN): Mark Jones (play-by-play), Roddy Jones (analyst), and Quint Kessenich (sideline reporter)

Game information

First quarter

No scoring plays

Second quarter

- (12:46) Virginia Tech – Quentin Reddish 77-yard blocked field goal return, John Love kick (Drive: 1 plays, 77 yards, 0:00; Virginia Tech 7–0)

Third quarter

- (11:25) Clemson – Cole Turner 29-yard pass from Cade Klubnik, Nolan Hauser kick (Drive: 8 plays, 75 yards, 3:35; Tied 7–7)
- (07:34) Clemson – T. J. Moore 41-yard pass from Klubnik, Hauser kick (Drive: 3 plays, 44 yards, 1:32; Clemson 14–7)

Fourth quarter

- (13:08) Clemson – Jake Briningstool 12-yard pass from Klubnik, Hauser kick (Drive: 10 plays, 93 yards, 5:45; Clemson 21–7)
- (05:10) Clemson – Hauser 34-yard field goal (Drive: 4 plays, 4 yards, 0:55; Clemson 24–7)
- (01:43) Virginia Tech – Ayden Green 14-yard pass from Kyron Drones, Love kick (Drive: 13 plays, 75 yards, 3:27; Clemson 24–14)

Statistics	CLEM	VT
First downs	20	15
Total yards	378	228
Rushing yards	167	40
Passing yards	211	188
Passing: Comp–Att–Int	16–34–1	16–37–2
Time of possession	36:49	23:11

Team	Category	Player	Statistics
Clemson	Passing	Cade Klubnik	16/34, 211 yards, 3 TD, INT
Clemson	Rushing	Phil Mafah	26 carries, 133 yards
Clemson	Receiving	T. J. Moore	2 receptions, 58 yards, TD
Virginia Tech	Passing	Kyron Drones	9/20, 115 yards, INT
Virginia Tech	Rushing	Collin Schlee	5 carries, 28 yards
Virginia Tech	Receiving	Da'Quan Felton	6 receptions, 68 yards

=== at Duke ===
Virginia Tech Hokies (5–5) at Duke Blue Devils (7–3) – Game summary

Quarter	1	2	3	4	Total
Hokies	7	10	0	11	28
Blue Devils	14	7	10	0	31

at Wallace Wade Stadium • Durham, NC

- Date: November 23, 2024
- Game time: 8:00 p.m.
- Game weather: Clear
- Game attendance: 22,462
- Referee: Adam Savoie
- TV announcers (ACCN): Wes Durham (play-by-play), Tom Luginbill (analyst) and Dana Boyle (sideline)

Game information

First quarter

- (12:55) DUKE – Eli Pancol 86-yard pass from Maalik Murphy, Todd Pelino kick (Drive: 1 play, 86 yards, 0:10; Duke 7–0)
- (8:40) DUKE – Eli Pancol 77-yard pass from Maalik Murphy, Todd Pelino kick (Drive: 3 plays, 80 yards, 0:52; Duke 14–0)
- (4:28) VT – Ali Jennings 65-yard pass from Collin Schlee, John Love kick (Drive: 2 plays, 85 yards, 1:17; Duke 14–7)

Second quarter

- (12:45) VT – Ayden Greene 21-yard run, John Love kick (Drive: 6 plays, 64 yards, 2:39; Tied 14–14)
- (7:55) VT – John Love 24-yard field goal (Drive: 9 plays, 29 yards, 4:08; Virginia Tech 17–14)
- (5:41) DUKE – Eli Pancol 7-yard pass from Maalik Murphy, Todd Pelino kick (Drive: 5 plays, 75 yards, 2:14; Duke 21–17)

Third quarter

- (11:52) DUKE – Star Thomas 2-yard run, Todd Pelino kick (Drive: 7 plays, 74 yards, 3:03; Duke 28–17)
- (3:24) DUKE – Todd Pelino 42-yard field goal (Drive: 6 plays, 6 yards, 3:02; Duke 31–17)

Fourth quarter

- (13:22) VT – John Love 38-yard field goal (Drive: 10 plays, 54 yards, 5:02; Duke 31–20)
- (9:19) VT – Bhayshul Tuten 29-yard run, William Watson III rush (Drive: 8 plays, 56 yards, 3:03; Duke 31–28)

Statistics	VT	DUKE
First downs	23	12
Total yards	403	396
Rushing yards	190	64
Passing yards	213	332
Passing: Comp–Att–Int	15–32–1	17–35–3
Time of possession	38:26	21:34

Team	Category	Player	Statistics
Virginia Tech	Passing	William "Pop" Watson III	12/25, 146 yards, INT
Virginia Tech	Rushing	Bhayshul Tuten	19 carries, 84 yards, TD
Virginia Tech	Receiving	Ali Jennings	6 receptions, 158 yards, TD
Duke	Passing	Maalik Murphy	17/35, 332 yards, 3 TD, 3 INT
Duke	Rushing	Star Thomas	19 carries, 63 yards, TD
Duke	Receiving	Eli Pancol	5 receptions, 188 yards, 3 TD

=== vs Virginia (rivalry) ===
Virginia Cavaliers (5–6) vs Virginia Tech Hokies (5–6) – Game summary

Quarter	1	2	3	4	Total
Cavaliers	0	3	8	6	17
Hokies	10	10	10	7	37

at Lane Stadium • Blacksburg, VA

- Date: November 30, 2024
- Game time: 8:00 p.m.
- Game weather: Temperature: 31 °F (−1 °C) • Wind: SW 4 mph • Weather: Sunny
- Game attendance: 65,632
- TV announcers (ACCN): Wes Durham (play-by-play), Tom Luginbill (analyst) and Dana Boyle (sideline)

Game information

First quarter

- (9:06) VT – Bhayshul Tuten 6-yard run, John Love kick (Drive: 11 plays, 90 yards, 5:49; Virginia Tech 7–0)
- (1:16) VT – John Love 44-yard field goal (Drive: 12 plays, 44 yards, 6:51; Virginia Tech 10–0)

Second quarter

- (2:46) UVA – Will Bettridge 37-yard field goal (Drive: 6 plays, 34 yards, 2:49; Virginia Tech 10–3)
- (1:50) VT – Jaylin Lane 66-yard pass from William Watson III, John Love kick (Drive: 2 plays, 75 yards, 0:56; Virginia Tech 17–3)
- (0:00) VT – John Love 31-yard field goal (Drive: 5 plays, 32 yards, 0:54; Virginia Tech 20–3)

Third quarter

- (10:05) VT – William Watson III 5-yard run, John Love kick (Drive: 5 plays, 45 yards, 2:13; Virginia 27–3)
- (5:23) UVA – Tony Muskett 2-yard run, Tony Muskett pass to Tyler Neville for 2-point conversion (Drive: 10 plays, 75 yards, 4:42; Virginia Tech 27–11)
- (3:08) VT – John Love 28-yard field goal (Drive: 7 plays, 64 yards, 2:15; Virginia Tech 30–11)

Fourth quarter

- (13:12) UVA – Tony Muskett 5-yard run, 2-point pass conversion failed (Drive: 11 plays, 75 yards, 4:56; Virginia Tech 30–17)
- (6:12) VT – Bhayshul Tuten 58-yard run, John Love kick (Drive: 4 plays, 77 yards, 2:28; Virginia Tech 37–17)

Statistics	UVA	VT
First downs	19	21
Total yards	274	458
Rushing yards	96	204
Passing yards	178	254
Passing: Comp–Att–Int	19–36–2	14–21–0
Time of possession	28:42	31:18

Team	Category	Player	Statistics
Virginia	Passing	Tony Muskett	19/36, 178 yards, 2 Int
Virginia	Rushing	Tony Muskett	18 carries, 62 yards, 2 TD
Virginia	Receiving	Suderian Harrison	5 receptions, 54 yards
Virginia Tech	Passing	William "Pop" Watson III	14/21, 254 yards, 1 TD
Virginia Tech	Rushing	Bhayshul Tuten	18 carries, 124 yards, 2 TD
Virginia Tech	Receiving	Jaylin Lane	4 receptions, 91 yards, 1 TD

=== vs Minnesota (Duke's Mayo Bowl) ===
2025 Duke's Mayo Bowl
Minnesota Golden Gophers (7–5) vs Virginia Tech Hokies (6–6) – Game summary

Quarter	1	2	3	4	Total
Golden Gophers	0	21	0	3	24
Hokies	7	3	0	0	10

at Bank of America Stadium • Charlotte, North Carolina

- Date: Friday, January 3, 2025
- Game time: 7:30 p.m. EST
- Game weather: Sunny • Temperature: 41 °F (5 °C) • Wind: 10 mph (16 km/h) west
- Game attendance: 31,927
- Referee: Jason Autrey
- TV announcers (ESPN): Matt Barrie (play-by-play), Aaron Murray (analyst), and Harry Lyles Jr. (sideline)

Game information

First quarter

- (0:08) VT - Collin Schlee 3-yard rush (John Love kick) (Drive: 8 plays, 80 yards, 3:57; Virginia Tech 7–0)

Second quarter

- (10:18) MINN - Elijah Spencer 10-yard pass from Darius Taylor (Dragan Kesich kick) (Drive: 9 plays, 80 yards, 4:50; Tied 7–7)
- (5:13) MINN - Elijah Spencer 12-yard pass from Max Brosmer (Dragan Kesich kick) (Drive: 8 plays, 65 yards, 4:02; Minnesota 14–7)
- (0:56) MINN - Darius Taylor 28-yard rush (Dragan Kesich kick) (Drive: 6 plays, 58 yards, 0:52; Minnesota 21–7)
- (0:00) VT - John Love 60-yard field goal (Drive: 5 plays, 38 yards, 0:56; Minnesota 21–10)

Third quarter

- No scoring plays

Fourth quarter

- (11:59) MINN - Dragan Kesich 44-yard field goal (Drive: 15 plays, 66 yards, 9:20; Minnesota 24–10)

Statistics	MINN	VT
First downs	23	9
Total yards	403	223
Rushing yards	167	74
Passing yards	236	149
Passing: Comp–Att–Int	20–31–1	10–18–1
Time of possession	35:24	24:36

Team	Category	Player	Statistics
Minnesota	Passing	Max Brosmer	18/29, 211 yards, TD, INT
Minnesota	Rushing	Darius Taylor	20 carries, 113 yards, TD
Minnesota	Receiving	Elijah Spencer	6 receptions, 81 yards, 2 TD
Virginia Tech	Passing	William Watson III	8/12, 81 yards, INT
Virginia Tech	Rushing	Keylen Adams	1 carry, 47 yards
Virginia Tech	Receiving	Ayden Greene	6 receptions, 115 yards

== Personnel ==
=== Coaching staff ===
Virginia Tech Hokies coaches
Name	Title	Joined staff
Brent Pry	Head coach	2022
J. C. Price	Associate head coach/defensive line coach	2021
Fontel Mines	Assistant head coach/wide receivers coach/offensive recruiting coordinator	2022
Chris Marve	Defensive coordinator/linebackers coach	2022
Tyler Bowen	Offensive coordinator/quarterbacks coach	2022
Stu Holt	Special teams coordinator/tight end coach	2022
Ron Crook	Offensive line coach	2022
Elijah Brooks	Running backs coach	2022
Derek Jones	Cornerbacks coach/defensive recruiting coordinator	2022
Pierson Prioleau	Safeties coach	2019
Shawn Quinn	Nickels/stars coach	2022
Mike Moyseenko	Offensive analyst	2022
Brandon McCombs	Special teams analyst	2022
Xavier Adibi	Senior analyst	2022
Brian Crist	Senior analyst	2022
Brent Davis	Senior analyst	2022
Jeron Gouveia-Winslow	Analyst	2022
Dwight Galt IV	Senior director of strength & conditioning	2022

=== Roster ===
2024 Virginia Tech Hokies football team roster
Players
Coaches
Offense

Pos.	#	Name	Class
WR	0	Ali Jennings	GS
QB	1	Kyron Drones	Jr
WR	2	Takye Heath	Fr
QB	3	Collin Schlee	Sr
WR	4	Chance Fitzgerald	Fr
WR	5	Xayvion Turner-Bradshaw	So
WR	6	Keylen Adams	Fr
WR	7	Chanz Wiggins	Fr
QB	8	Davi Belfort	Fr
WR	9	Da'Quan Felton	GS
WR	11	Tucker Holloway	Jr
WR	12	Stephen Gosnell	GS
TE	13	Ja'Ricous Hairston	Fr
QB	15	Jackson Sigler	Fr
QB	18	William Watson III	Fr
QB	19	Ben Locklear	Jr
RB	20	P. J. Prioleau	Jr
RB	21	Jeremiah Coney	Fr
RB	23	Tyler Mason	Fr
RB	24	Malachi Thomas	Jr
WR	25	Ayden Greene	So
RB	27	Ty'Drez Clements	Fr
RB	33	Bhayshul Tuten	Sr
RB	35	John Buetow	Fr
TE	40	Cole Pickett	Jr
TE	49	Connor Ferguson	Fr
OL	50	Gunner Givens	So
OL	51	Elijah Haughawout	Fr
OL	52	Tyler Smedley	Jr
OL	53	Tommy Ricard	Fr
OL	54	Grant Karczewski	Fr
OL	56	Layth Ghannan	Fr
OL	60	Caleb Nitta	Fr
OL	61	Braelin Moore	So
OL	63	Griffin Duggan	Jr
OL	64	Lance Williams	Fr
OL	65	Xavier Chaplin	So
OL	66	Montavious Cunningham	Jr
OL	67	Hannes Hammer	Fr
OL	68	Kaden Moore	Sr
OL	70	Parker Clements	Sr
OL	72	Web Davidson	Fr
OL	75	Bob Schick	Sr
OL	76	Aidan Lynch	Fr
OL	77	Brody Meadows	So
OL	79	Johnny Garrett	So
WR	80	L.J. Booker	Fr
WR	81	Jordan Tapscott	Fr
TE	82	Benji Gosnell	So
WR	83	Jaylin Lane	Sr
TE	86	Nick Gallo	GS
TE	87	Harrison Saint Germain	So
TE	88	Zeke Wimbush	Fr
WR	89	Charlie O'Connor	Fr
TE	99	Cole Reemsnyder	So

Defense

Pos.	#	Name	Class
LB	0	Keli Lawson	Jr
CB	1	Dante Lovett	So
DL	2	Keyshawn Burgos	Jr
LB	3	Sam Brumfield	Sr
CB	4	Mansoor Delane	Jr
CB	5	Joshua Clarke	Fr
DL	6	Josh Fuga	GS
STAR	7	Keonta Jenkins	GS
CB	8	Braylon Johnson	So
S	9	Cameren Fleming	Fr
S	11	Devin Alves	So
STAR	12	Gabe Williams	Fr
DL	13	Kemari Copeland	Jr
CB	14	Jonathan Pennix	Fr
S	15	Jaylen Jones	Sr
DL	16	Aeneas Peebles	GS
DL	17	Cole Nelson	Sr
S	18	Mose Phillips III	So
S	19	Noah Jenkins	Fr
LB	20	Caleb Woodson	So
S	21	Quentin Reddish	Fr
DL	22	Tyler Mason	Jr
CB	23	Thomas Williams	Fr
LB	24	Jaden Keller	Jr
DB	26	Jalen Stroman	Sr
S	27	Tyler Childress	Jr
LB	28	Kaleb Spencer	So
CB	30	Krystian Williams	Fr
DL	31	Jason Abbey	Fr
DL	32	Deric Dandy	Fr
CB	33	Miles Ellis	Jr
CB	34	Josh Jones	Fr
CB	35	Israel Hairston	Fr
STAR	36	Brody Jones	Fr
S	37	Josh Gholston	Jr
LB	38	Jayden McDonald	Jr
DL	39	Jorden McDonald	Jr
STAR	40	Stephon Hicks	Fr
LB	41	George Ballance	Fr
DL	42	Aycen Stevens	Fr
LB	43	Josh Hand	So
CB	44	Dorian Strong	GS
DL	45	Elijah Klock	So
DL	46	Ishmael Findlayter	Fr
LB	48	Jaelyn Allen	Fr
LB	50	Darius Taylor	Fr
STAR	51	Sam Hughes	Jr
DL	52	Antwaun Powell-Ryland	Sr
LB	53	Will Johnson	Jr
DL	54	Malachi Madison	So
DL	55	Gerard Johnson	Fr
DL	56	C. J. McCray	Sr
DL	57	James Jennette	Jr
DL	90	Andrew Hanchuk	Fr
DL	91	Wilfried Pene	Sr
DL	97	Khurtiss Perry	So
DL	99	Emmett Laws	Fr

Special teams

Pos.	#	Name	Class
K	17	John Love	So
K	38	Kyle Lowe	Jr
LS	47	Griffin Armstrong	Sr
P	85	Peter Moore	Sr
K	92	Aiden Daugherty	Fr
LS	94	Tate Kendall	Fr
K	95	Nick Veltsistas	Jr
LS	96	Christian Epling	So
K	98	Connor McLaughlin	Fr

Head coach

- Brent Pry

Coordinators/assistant coaches

- J. C. Price – Associate head coach/defensive linemen
- Tyler Bowen – Offensive coordinator/quarterbacks
- Chris Marve – Defensive coordinator/linebackers
- Stu Holt – Special teams coordinator/tight ends
- Derek Jones – Defensive recruiting coordinator/cornerbacks
- Shawn Quinn – Stars/nickels
- Pierson Prioleau – Safeties
- Ron Crook – Offensive linemen
- Fontel Mines – Offensive recruiting coordinator/wide receivers
- Elijah Brooks – Running backs
- Xavier Adibi – Associate linebackers
- Brian Crist – Co-quarterbacks
- Brent Davis – Co-offensive linemen
- Jeron Gouveia-Winslow – Associate safeties
- Brandon McCombs – Assistant special teams/specialist
- Mike Moyseenko – Assistant tight ends
- Brayden DeVault-Smith – Assistant cornerbacks/quality control
- Austin Fields – Assistant offensive line/quality control
- Jan Johnson Jr. – Assistant defensive line/quality control
- Cam Phillips – Assistant wide receivers/quality control
- Dwight Galt IV – Director, strength and conditioning
- Greg Allen – Assistant director of strength and conditioning
- Brandon Dillard – Assistant director of strength and conditioning
- Jarrett Ferguson – Assistant director of strength and conditioning
- Ryan Hardie – Assistant director of strength and conditioning

Legend

- (C) Team captain
- (S) Suspended
- (I) Ineligible
- Injured
- Redshirt

Roster
Last update: 10/2/24

=== Incoming transfers ===
Player	Position	Previous school
Sam Brumfield	LB	Middle Tennessee
Montavious Cunningham	OT	Georgia State
Kelvin Gilliam Jr.	DL	Oklahoma
Aeneas Peebles	DL	Duke
Khurtiss Perry	DL	Alabama
Collin Schlee	QB	UCLA
Kaleb Spencer	LB	Miami

=== Outgoing transfers ===
Player	Position	Destination
Gabe Arena	IOL	Buffalo
Chance Black	RB	Valdosta State
Derrick Canteen	CB	Cincinnati
Tavorian Copeland	LB	Unknown
Antonio Cotman Jr.	CB	Charlotte
Johnny Dickson	IOL	North Texas
Bryce Duke	RB	Old Dominion
Ny'Quee Hawkins	S	Sam Houston
Jack Hollifield	IOL	Appalachian State
Jonathan Kuhler	OL	Central Connecticut
Bryce LaFollette	P	Towson
Da'Wain Lofton	WR	Oklahoma State
Hunter McLain	IOL	James Madison
Tralon Mitchell	RB	Winston-Salem State
Christian Moss	WR	Kennesaw State
Luke Shields	WR	Tennessee Tech
Latrell Sutton	WR	Slippery Rock
J. R. Walker	LB	UNC Pembroke
Dylan Wittke	QB	Minnesota
Dae'Quan Wright	TE	Ole Miss

=== 2025 NFL draft ===
Round	Pick	Player	Position	NFL team
4	104	Bhayshul Tuten	RB	Jacksonville Jaguars
4	128	Jaylin Lane	WR	Washington Commanders
6	177	Dorian Strong	CB	Buffalo Bills
6	209	Antwaun Powell-Ryland	OLB	Philadelphia Eagles
6	210	Aeneas Peebles	DL	Baltimore Ravens
	UDFA	Collin Schlee	QB	Washington Commanders
	UDFA	Da'Quan Felton	WR	New York Giants
	UDFA	Stephen Gosnell	WR	Buffalo Bills
	UDFA	Keonta Jenkins	STAR	Buffalo Bills
	UDFA	Kaden Moore	OL	Tennessee Titans
	UDFA	Parker Clements	OL	Las Vegas Raiders
	UDFA	Jaylen Jones	SF	Los Angeles Chargers
	UDFA	Joshua Fuga	DL	Los Angeles Chargers
	UDFA	Wilifried Pene	DL	New England Patriots

== Accolades ==
=== ACC media preseason poll ===
The ACC media poll was released on July 22, 2024.

Media poll (170 votes)
Predicted finish	Team	Votes all (1st place)	2023 W–L overall (conf.)
1	Florida State	2708 (81)	13–1 (8–0)
2	Clemson	2657 (55)	9–4 (4–4)
3	Miami	2344 (17)	7–6 (3–5)
4	NC State	2318 (8)	9–4 (6–2)
5	Louisville	1984	10–4 (7–1)
6	Virginia Tech	1968 (5)	7–6 (5–3)
7	SMU	1798	11–3 (8–0)
8	North Carolina	1712	8–5 (4–4)
9	Georgia Tech	1539 (1)	7–6 (5–3)
10	California	1095 (2)	6–7 (4–5)
11	Duke	1056	8–5 (4–4)
12	Syracuse	1035	6–7 (2–6)
13	Pittsburgh	1016	3–9 (2–6)
14	Boston College	890 (1)	7–6 (3–5)
15	Wake Forest	784	4–8 (1–7)
16	Virginia	629	3–9 (2–6)
17	Stanford	477	3–9 (2–7)

=== Team captains ===
Player	Jersey #	Position	Year
Dorian Strong	44	DB	Sr.
Cole Nelson	17	DL	
Sam Brumfield	3	LB	(redshirt) Sr.
Kaden Moore	68	OL	
Peter Moore	85	P	(redshirt) Sr.
Kyron Drones	1	QB	(redshirt) Jr.
Da'Quan Felton	9	WR	

=== Award watch lists ===
Award	Category	Nominee	Position	Year	2024 Winner
Allstate Wuerffel Trophy	Community Service	Jaylin Lane	WR	GS	
Bednarik Award	Defensive PotY	Aeneas Peebles	DT	GS	
Bednarik Award	Defensive PotY	Antwaun Powell-Ryland	DL	(redshirt) Sr.	
Rotary Lombardi Award	Defensive PotY	Aeneas Peebles	DT	GS	
Rotary Lombardi Award	Defensive PotY	Antwaun Powell-Ryland	DL	(redshirt) Sr.	
John Mackey Award	Tight End	Nick Gallo	TE	GS	
Jet Award	Return Specialist	Tucker Holloway	WR	Jr.	
Butkus Award	Linebacker	Sam Brumfield	DB	(redshirt) Sr.	
Jet Award	Return Specialist	Bhayshul Tuten	RB	Sr.	
Bobby Dodd Award	Coach of the Year	Brent Pry	HC		
Comeback of the Year	Player	Ali Jennings	WR		
Doak Walker Award	Running back	Bhayshul Tuten	RB	Sr.	
Davey O’Brien Award	Quarterback	Kyron Drones ^{c}	QB	(redshirt) Jr.	
Ray Guy Award	Punter	Peter Moore ^{c}	P	(redshirt) Sr.	
Lou Groza Award	Place-Kicker	John Love	PK	Sr.	
All ACC Team	Player	Aeneas Peebles	DT	GS	
All ACC Team	Player	Dorian Strong ^{c}	CB	Sr.	
ACC	Player of the Year	Kyron Drones ^{c}	QB	(redshirt) Jr.	
ACC	Player of the Year	Bhayshul Tuten	RB	Sr.	
ACC	Player of the Year	Antwaun Powell-Ryland	DL	(redshirt) Sr.	
Paul Hornung Award	Most Versatile	Bhayshul Tuten	RB	Sr.	
Bronko Nagurski Trophy	Defensive Player	Aeneas Peebles	DT	GS	
Maxwell Award	College Player of the Year	Kyron Drones ^{c}	QB	(redshirt) Jr.	
Maxwell Award	College Player of the Year	Bhayshul Tuten	RB	Sr.	
Dudley Award	Virginia College Player of the Year	Antwaun Powell-Ryland	DL	Sr.	Antwaun Powell-Ryland

C = Team captain
