= 2022 Virginia Tech Hokies football team =

American college football season

2022 Virginia Tech Hokies football
- Conference: Atlantic Coast Conference
- Coastal Division
- Record: 3–8 (1–6 ACC)
- Head coach: Brent Pry (1st season)
- Offensive coordinator: Tyler Bowen (1st season)
- Offensive scheme: Multiple
- Defensive coordinator: Chris Marve (1st season)
- Base defense: 4–3
- Home stadium: Lane Stadium

2022 Atlantic Coast Conference football standings
	Conf.			Overall
Team	W		L	W		L
Atlantic Division
No. 13 Clemson xy$	8	–	0	11	–	3
No. 11 Florida State	5	–	3	10	–	3
Louisville	4	–	4	8	–	5
NC State	4	–	4	8	–	5
Syracuse	4	–	4	7	–	6
Wake Forest	3	–	5	8	–	5
Boston College	2	–	6	3	–	9
Coastal Division
North Carolina xy	6	–	2	9	–	5
Duke	5	–	3	9	–	4
No. 22 Pittsburgh	5	–	3	9	–	4
Georgia Tech	4	–	4	5	–	7
Miami (FL)	3	–	5	5	–	7
Virginia	1	–	6	3	–	7
Virginia Tech	1	–	6	3	–	8
Championship: Clemson 39, North Carolina 10
$ – Conference champion; x – Division champion/co-champions; y – Championship game participant; Rankings from AP Poll

The 2022 Virginia Tech Hokies football team represented Virginia Tech during the 2022 NCAA Division I FBS football season. The Hokies were led by first-year head coach Brent Pry. They played their home games at Lane Stadium in Blacksburg, Virginia, competing as members of the Atlantic Coast Conference (ACC).

== Schedule ==
Date	Time	Opponent	Site	TV	Result	Attendance
September 2	7:00 p.m.	at Old Dominion*	S.B. Ballard Stadium; Norfolk, VA	ESPNU	L 17–20	21,944
September 10	8:00 p.m.	Boston College	Lane Stadium; Blacksburg, VA (rivalry)	ACCN	W 27–10	65,632
September 17	11:00 a.m.	Wofford*	Lane Stadium; Blacksburg, VA	ACCN	W 27–7	62,043
September 22	7:30 p.m.	West Virginia*	Lane Stadium; Blacksburg, VA (rivalry)	ESPN	L 10–33	65,632
October 1	3:30 p.m.	at North Carolina	Kenan Memorial Stadium; Chapel Hill, NC	ACCN	L 10–41	45,029
October 8	3:30 p.m.	at Pittsburgh	Acrisure Stadium; Pittsburgh, PA	ACCN	L 29–45	54,677
October 15	12:30 p.m.	Miami (FL)	Lane Stadium; Blacksburg, VA (rivalry)	ACCRSN	L 14–20	65,632
October 27	7:30 p.m.	at No. 24 NC State	Carter–Finley Stadium; Raleigh, NC	ESPN	L 21–22	56,919
November 5	12:30 p.m.	Georgia Tech	Lane Stadium; Blacksburg, VA (rivalry)	ACCRSN	L 27–28	62,843
November 12	12:00 p.m.	at Duke	Wallace Wade Stadium; Durham, NC	ACCRSN	L 7–24	20,857
November 19	12:00 p.m.	at Liberty*	Williams Stadium; Lynchburg, VA	ESPN+	W 23–22	23,055
November 26		Virginia	Lane Stadium; Blacksburg, VA (rivalry)		Canceled	
*Non-conference game; Rankings from AP Poll released prior to the game; All times are in Eastern time

== Game summaries ==
=== At Old Dominion ===
Virginia Tech at Old Dominion

Team	1	2	3	4	Total
Hokies	7	0	10	0	17
• Monarchs	0	10	0	10	20

- Date: September 2, 2022
- Location: S.B. Ballard Stadium
  Norfolk, VA
- Game start: 7:04 p.m. EDT
- Elapsed time: 4 hours and 7 minutes
- Game attendance: 21,944
- Game weather: 81 °F (27 °C) • Weather: Sunny • Wind: SW 10 MPH
- Referee: Wayne Wrinkler
- TV announcers (ESPNU): Kevin Brown (play–by–play) and Hutson Mason (analyst)

Scoring summary
1	09:12	VT	Grant Wells 18-yard rush (William Ross kick) (4 plays, 66 yards, 1:31)	VT 7–0
2	12:02	ODU	Ethan Sanchez 29-yard field goal (8 plays, 25 yards, 3:46)	VT 7–3
2	01:26	ODU	Robert Kennedy III 25-yard fumble return (Ethan Sanchez kick) (7 plays, -7 yards, 3:21)	ODU 10–7
3	09:03	VT	William Ross 44-yard field goal (8 plays, 46 yards, 4:28)	TIE 10–10
3	05:11	VT	Keshawn King 6-yard pass from Grant Wells (William Ross kick) (3 plays, 10 yards, 0:46)	VT 17–10
4	12:30	ODU	Ethan Sanchez 20-yard field goal (12 plays, 49 yards, 3:57)	VT 17–13
4	00:33	ODU	Blake Watson 1-yard rush (Ethan Sanchez kick) (9 plays, 74 yards, 2:25)	ODU 20–17

Statistics	VT	ODU
First downs	18	13
Total yards	333	248
Rushing yards	136	83
Passing yards	197	165
Turnovers	5	2
Time of possession	33:23	26:37

Team	Category	Player	Statistics
Virginia Tech	Passing	Grant Wells	21/36, 197 yards, TD, 4 INT
Virginia Tech	Rushing	Keshawn King	19 rushes, 111 yards
Virginia Tech	Receiving	Nick Gallo	7 receptions, 49 yards
Old Dominion	Passing	Hayden Wolff	14/35, 165 yards
Old Dominion	Rushing	Blake Watson	19 rushes, 60 yards, TD
Old Dominion	Receiving	Ali Jennings III	5 receptions, 122 yards

=== Boston College ===
Quarter	1	2	3	4	Total
Boston College	0	3	7	0	10
Virginia Tech	10	7	7	3	27

at Lane Stadium • Blacksburg, VA

- Date: September 10, 2022
- Game time: 8:00 p.m. EDT
- Game weather: rain • Temperature: 64 °F (18 °C)
- Game attendance: 65,632
- Referee: Stuart Mullins
- TV announcers (ACC Network): Dave O'Brien, Tim Hasselbeck, Katie George

Game information

First Quarter

- (11:04) VT – Jalen Holston 1 yd Rush (William Ross Kick) (Drive: 7 plays, 14 yards, 3:13; VT 7–0)
- (0:48) VT - William Ross 49 yd Field Goal (Drive: 13 plays, 48 yards, 5:49; VT 10-0)

Second Quarter

- (13:50) VT – Keshawn King 65 yd Rush (William Ross Kick) (Drive: 1 play, 65 yards, 0:11; VT 17–0)
- (0:22) BC - Connor Lytton 30 yd Field Goal (Drive: 14 plays, 65 yards, 4:25; VT 17-3)

Third Quarter

- (5:18) BC – Jaden Williams 17 yd Pass From Phil Jurkovec (Connor Lytton Kick) (Drive: 6 plays, 86 yards, 2:11; VT 17–10)
- (1:22) VT - Kaleb Smith 2 yd Pass From Grant Wells (William Ross Kick) (Drive: 9 plays, 78 yards, 3:51; VT 24-10)

Fourth Quarter

- (4:20) VT – William Ross 38 yd Field Goal (Drive: 9 plays, 23 yards, 4:05; VT 27–10)

Statistics	BC	VT
First downs	11	14
Total yards	155	284
Rush yards	4	144
Passing yards	151	140
Turnovers	1	0
Time of possession	27:29	32:31

Team	Category	Player	Statistics
Boston College	Passing	Phil Jurkovec	15/28, 135 yards, TD
Boston College	Rushing	Patrick Garwo	10 carries, 15 yards
Boston College	Receiving	Zay Flowers	4 receptions, 79 yards
Virginia Tech	Passing	Grant Wells	16/25, 140 yards, TD
Virginia Tech	Rushing	Keshawn King	4 carries, 64 yards
Virginia Tech	Receiving	Kaleb Smith	3 receptions, 50 yards, TD

=== Wofford ===
Quarter	1	2	3	4	Total
Wofford	0	0	0	7	7
Virginia Tech	3	17	0	7	27

at Lane Stadium • Blacksburg, VA

- Date: September 17, 2022
- Game time: 11:00 a.m. EDT
- Game weather: sunny • Temperature: 69 °F (21 °C)
- Game attendance: 62,043
- Referee: Marcus Woods
- TV announcers (ACC Network): Wes Durham, Eddie Royal, Taylor Davis

Game information

First Quarter

- (3:46) VT – William Ross 46 yd Field Goal (Drive: 7 plays, 44 yards, 2:46; VT 3–0)

Second Quarter

- (14:51) VT – William Ross 41 yd Field Goal (Drive: 9 plays, 52 yards, 3:06; VT 6–0)
- (5:48) VT - Jalen Holston 1 yd Rush (William Ross Kick) (Drive: 12 plays, 82 yards, 5:36; VT 13-0)
- (0:25) VT - Jadan Blue 11 yd Pass From Grant Wells (William Ross Kick) (Drive: 10 plays, 64 yards, 2:52; VT 20-0)

Fourth Quarter

- (12:57) VT – Bryce Duke 27 yd Pass From Grant Wells (William Ross Kick) (Drive: 8 plays, 80 yards, 3:20; VT 27–0)
- (9:34) WOF - Nathan Walker 3 yd Rush (Atkins Roberts Kick) (Drive: 6 plays, 75 yards, 3:23; VT 27-7)

Statistics	WOF	VT
First downs	12	29
Total yards	199	475
Rush yards	38	133
Passing yards	161	342
Turnovers	0	0
Time of possession	25:02	34:58

Team	Category	Player	Statistics
Wofford	Passing	Jimmy Weirick	14/20, 161 yards
Wofford	Rushing	Nathan Walker	12 carries, 27 yards, TD
Wofford	Receiving	Landon Parker	5 receptions, 98 yards
Virginia Tech	Passing	Grant Wells	26/35, 314 yards, 2 TD
Virginia Tech	Rushing	Jalen Holston	16 carries, 66 yards, TD
Virginia Tech	Receiving	Jadan Blue	4 receptions, 61 yards, TD

=== West Virginia ===
Quarter	1	2	3	4	Total
West Virginia	3	10	3	17	33
Virginia Tech	0	7	3	0	10

at Lane Stadium • Blacksburg, VA

- Date: September 22, 2022
- Game time: 7:30 p.m. EDT
- Game weather: sunny • Temperature: 61 °F (16 °C)
- Game attendance: 65,632
- Referee: Scott Campbell
- TV announcers (ESPN): Matt Barrie, Louis Riddick, Harry Lyles, Jr.

Game information

First Quarter

- (3:19) WVU – Casey Legg 23 yd Field Goal (Drive: 14 plays, 92 yards, 7:06; WVU 3–0)

Second Quarter

- (14:52) VT – Kaleb Smith 28 yd Pass From Grant Wells (William Ross Kick) (Drive: 8 plays, 77 yards, 3:22; VT 7–3)
- (1:50) WVU - Casey Legg 35 yd Field Goal (Drive: 9 plays, 40 yards, 3:14; VT 7-6)
- (0:11) WVU - Sam James 24 yd Pass From JT Daniels (Casey Legg Kick) (Drive: 6 plays, 70 yards, 0:50; WVU 13-7)

Third Quarter

- (7:04) WVU - Casey Legg 25 yd Field Goal (Drive: 14 plays, 79 yards, 6:31; WVU 16-7)
- (4:19) VT - William Ross 44 yd Field Goal (Drive: 9 plays, 50 yards, 2:40; WVU 16-10)

Fourth Quarter

- (14:13) WVU – Justin Johnson Jr. 6 yd Rush (Casey Legg Kick) (Drive: 9 plays, 75 yards, 5:06; WVU 23–10)
- (10:16) WVU - Casey Legg 38 yd Field Goal (Drive: 5 plays, 35 yards, 2:54; WVU 26-10)
- (9:36) WVU - Jacolby Spells 27 yd Interception Return (Casey Legg Kick) (WVU 33-10)

Statistics	WVU	VT
First downs	32	14
Total yards	421	228
Rush yards	218	35
Passing yards	203	193
Turnovers	0	1
Time of possession	38:44	21:16

Team	Category	Player	Statistics
West Virginia	Passing	JT Daniels	20/30, 203 yards, TD
West Virginia	Rushing	CJ Donaldson	23 carries, 106 yards
West Virginia	Receiving	Kaden Prather	6 receptions, 69 yards
Virginia Tech	Passing	Grant Wells	16/35, 193 yards, TD
Virginia Tech	Rushing	Jalen Holston	4 carries, 18 yards
Virginia Tech	Receiving	Kaleb Smith	5 receptions, 70 yards, TD

=== At North Carolina ===
Quarter	1	2	3	4	Total
Virginia Tech	3	7	0	0	10
North Carolina	7	17	17	0	41

at Kenan Memorial Stadium • Chapel Hill, NC

- Date: October 1, 2022
- Game time: 3:30 p.m. EDT
- Game weather: rainy • Temperature: 62 °F (17 °C)
- Game attendance: 45,029
- Referee: Adam Savoie
- TV announcers (ACC Network): Dave O'Brien, Tim Hasselbeck, Kelsey Riggs

Game information

First Quarter

- (9:19) VT – William Ross 34 yd Field Goal (Drive: 9 plays, 59 yards, 3:51; VT 3–0)
- (4:37) UNC - Kamari Morales 3 yd Pass From Drake Maye (Noah Burnette Kick) (Drive: 12 plays, 75 yards, 4:42; UNC 7-3)

Second Quarter

- (12:37) UNC – Drake Maye 1 yd Rush (Noah Burnette Kick) (Drive: 11 plays, 85 yards, 4:18; UNC 14–3)
- (10:28) UNC - Antoine Green 16 yd Pass From Drake Maye (Noah Burnette Kick) (Drive: 1 play, 16 yards, 0:06; UNC 21-3)
- (0:28) VT - Grant Wells 2 yd Rush (William Ross Kick) (Drive: 14 plays, 69 yards, 5:04; UNC 21-10)
- (0:00) UNC - Noah Burnette 44 yd Field Goal (Drive: 4 plays, 48 yards, 0:28; UNC 24-10)

Third Quarter

- (7:45) UNC - Drake Maye 2 yd Rush (Noah Burnette Kick) (Drive: 12 plays, 94 yards, 4:00; UNC 31-10)
- (3:50) UNC - Noah Burnette 21 yd Field Goal (Drive: 8 plays, 61 yards, 2:26; UNC 34-10)
- (0:29) UNC - Bryson Nesbit 25 yd Pass From Drake Maye (Noah Burnette Kick) (Drive: 4 plays, 55 yards, 1:56; UNC 41-10)

Statistics	VT	UNC
First downs	14	24
Total yards	273	527
Rush yards	99	160
Passing yards	174	367
Turnovers	1	0
Time of possession	31:43	28:17

Team	Category	Player	Statistics
Virginia Tech	Passing	Grant Wells	16/26, 139 yards
Virginia Tech	Rushing	Keshawn King	9 carries, 52 yards
Virginia Tech	Receiving	Kaleb Smith	3 receptions, 49 yards
North Carolina	Passing	Drake Maye	26/36, 363 yards, 3 TD
North Carolina	Rushing	Drake Maye	13 carries, 73 yards, 2 TD
North Carolina	Receiving	Josh Downs	8 receptions, 120 yards

=== At Pitt ===
Quarter	1	2	3	4	Total
Virginia Tech	6	10	7	6	29
Pitt	7	10	14	14	45

at Acrisure Stadium • Pittsburgh, PA

- Date: October 8, 2022
- Game time: 3:30 p.m. EDT
- Game weather: cloudy • Temperature: 54 °F (12 °C)
- Game attendance: 54,677
- Referee: Riley Johnson
- TV announcers (ACCN): Wes Durham, Roddy Jones, Taylor Davis

Game information

First Quarter

- (3:53) PITT – Israel Abanikanda 38 yd Rush (Ben Sauls Kick) (Drive: 12 plays, 95 yards, 5:13; PITT 7–0)
- (2:50) VT - Malachi Thomas 5 yd Rush (Drive: 4 plays, 75 yards, 1:03; PITT 7-6)

Second Quarter

- (11:59) VT – William Ross 18 yd Field Goal (Drive: 13 plays, 67 yards, 5:18; VT 9–7)
- (10:45) VT - Keshawn King 19 yd Rush (William Ross Kick) (Drive: 2 plays, 25 yards, 0:30; VT 16-7)
- (7:14) PITT - Israel Abanikanda 17 yd Rush (Ben Sauls Kick) (Drive: 7 plays, 75 yards, 3:31; VT 16-14)
- (4:11) PITT - Ben Sauls 47 yd Field Goal (Drive: 5 plays, 27 yards, 1:55; PITT 17-16)

Third Quarter

- (9:54) PITT - Israel Abanikanda 29 yd Rush (Ben Sauls Kick) (Drive: 6 plays, 52 yards, 1:40; PITT 24-16)
- (6:48) PITT - Israel Abanikanda 5 yd Rush (Ben Sauls Kick) (Drive: 7 plays, 56 yards, 2:20; PITT 31-16)
- (0:30) VT - Da'Wain Lofton 43 yd Pass From Grant Wells (William Ross Kick) (Drive: 3 plays, 65 yards, 1:04; PITT 31-23)

Fourth Quarter

- (13:25) VT - Nyke Johnson 0 yd Punt Return (PITT 31-29)
- (10:40) PITT - Israel Abanikanda 10 yd Rush (Ben Sauls Kick) (Drive: 2 plays, 49 yards, 0:34; PITT 38-29)
- (7:56) PITT - Israel Abanikanda 80 yd Rush (Ben Sauls Kick) (Drive: 1 play, 80 yards, 0:12; PITT 45-29)

Statistics	VT	PITT
First downs	21	25
Total yards	403	496
Rush yards	126	326
Passing yards	277	170
Turnovers	1	1
Time of possession	27:29	32:31

Team	Category	Player	Statistics
Virginia Tech	Passing	Grant Wells	25/47, 277 yards, TD
Virginia Tech	Rushing	Malachi Thomas	15 carries, 84 yards, TD
Virginia Tech	Receiving	Kaleb Smith	9 receptions, 152 yards
Pitt	Passing	Kedon Slovis	15/28, 170 yards
Pitt	Rushing	Israel Abanikanda	36 carries, 320 yards, 6 TD
Pitt	Receiving	Jaden Bradley	5 receptions, 66 yards

=== Miami ===
Quarter	1	2	3	4	Total
Miami	10	7	3	0	20
Virginia Tech	0	0	0	14	14

at Lane Stadium • Blacksburg, VA

- Date: October 15, 2022
- Game time: 12:00 p.m. EDT
- Game weather: sunny • Temperature: 64 °F (18 °C)
- Game attendance: 65,632
- Referee: Marcus Wood
- TV announcers (ACCRSN): Tom Werme, James Bates, Wiley Ballard

Game information

First Quarter

- (12:05) MIA – Frank Ladson Jr. 5 yd Pass From Tyler Van Dyke (Andres Borregales Kick) (Drive: 4 plays, 65 yards, 1:32; MIA 7–0)
- (3:02) MIA - Andres Borregales 28 yd Field Goal (Drive: 18 plays, 71 yards, 7:42; MIA 10-0)

Second Quarter

- (5:28) MIA – Colbie Young 17 yd Pass From Tyler Van Dyke (Andres Borregales Kick) (Drive: 8 plays, 80 yards, 2:29; MIA 17–0)

Third Quarter

- (3:54) MIA - Andres Borregales 25 yd Field Goal (Drive: 6 plays, 43 yards, 2:26; MIA 20-0)

Fourth Quarter

- (12:10) VT – Malachi Thomas 14 yd Pass From Grant Wells (William Ross Kick) (Drive: 7 plays, 65 yards, 2:50; MIA 20–7)
- (3:20) VT - Grant Wells 3 yd Rush (William Ross Kick) (Drive: 10 plays, 80 yards, 2:42; MIA 20-14)

Statistics	MIA	VT
First downs	22	19
Total yards	458	257
Rush yards	107	78
Passing yards	351	179
Turnovers	0	1
Time of possession	31:12	28:48

Team	Category	Player	Statistics
Miami	Passing	Tyler Van Dyke	29/46, 351 yards, 2 TD
Miami	Rushing	Jaylan Knighton	10 carries, 27 yards
Miami	Receiving	Colbie Young	9 receptions, 110 yards, TD
Virginia Tech	Passing	Grant Wells	21/33, 179 yards, TD
Virginia Tech	Rushing	Malachi Thomas	13 carries, 41 yards
Virginia Tech	Receiving	Malachi Thomas	6 receptions, 43 yards, TD

=== At No. 24 NC State ===
Quarter	1	2	3	4	Total
Virginia Tech	0	0	21	0	21
No. 24 NC State	0	3	7	12	22

at Carter-Finley Stadium • Raleigh, NC

- Date: October 27, 2022
- Game time: 7:30 p.m. EDT
- Game weather: clear • Temperature: 58 °F (14 °C)
- Game attendance: 56,919
- Referee: Adam Savoie
- TV announcers (ESPN): Matt Barrie, Dan Mullen, Harry Lyles, Jr.

Game information

Second Quarter

- (0:05) NCST – Christopher Dunn 35 yd Field Goal (Drive: 8 plays, 25 yards, 1:08; NCST 3–0)

Third Quarter

- (12:51) VT - Grant Wells 4 yd Rush (William Ross Kick) (Drive: 6 plays, 78 yards, 2:03; VT 7-3)
- (9:18) VT - Kaleb Smith 85 yd Pass From Grant Wells (William Ross Kick) (Drive: 1 play, 80 yards, 0:11; VT 14-3)
- (4:02) VT - Grant Wells 20 yd Rush (William Ross Kick) (Drive: 5 plays, 65 yards, 2:26; VT 21-3)
- (1:42) NCST - Thayer Thomas 35 yd Pass From MJ Morris (Christopher Dunn Kick) (Drive: 6 plays, 75 yards, 2:20; VT 21-10)

Fourth Quarter

- (12:15) NCST - Trent Pennix 7 yd Pass From MJ Morris (Drive: 3 plays, 52 yards, 1:12; VT 21-16)
- (7:38) NCST - Thayer Thomas 18 yd Pass From MJ Morris (Drive: 7 plays, 60 yards, 3:01; NCST 22-21)

Statistics	VT	NCST
First downs	10	21
Total yards	293	356
Rush yards	50	60
Passing yards	243	296
Turnovers	0	0
Time of possession	23:56	36:04

Team	Category	Player	Statistics
Virginia Tech	Passing	Grant Wells	11/22, 243 yards, TD
Virginia Tech	Rushing	Malachi Thomas	9 carries, 21 yards
Virginia Tech	Receiving	Kaleb Smith	3 receptions, 141 yards, TD
No. 24 NC State	Passing	MJ Morris	20/29, 265 yards, 3 TD
No. 24 NC State	Rushing	Jordan Houston	9 carries, 31 yards
No. 24 NC State	Receiving	Thayer Thomas	10 receptions, 118 yards, 2 TD

=== Georgia Tech ===
Quarter	1	2	3	4	Total
Georgia Tech	10	3	3	12	28
Virginia Tech	0	20	7	0	27

at Lane Stadium • Blacksburg, VA

- Date: November 5, 2022
- Game time: 12:00 p.m. EDT
- Game weather: rainy • Temperature: 65 °F (18 °C)
- Game attendance: 62,844
- Referee: Stuart Mullins
- TV announcers (ACCRSN): Tom Werme, James Bates, Wiley Ballard

Game information

First Quarter

- (8:13) GT – Dontae Smith 29 yd Rush (Gavin Stewart Kick) (Drive: 7 plays, 70 yards, 2:20; GT 7–0)
- (1:22) GT - Gavin Stewart 19 yd Field Goal (Drive: 10 plays, 74 yards, 4:41; GT 10-0)

Second Quarter

- (10:15) VT – Grant Wells 3 yd Rush (William Ross Kick) (Drive: 6 plays, 50 yards, 1:53; GT 10–7)
- (3:51) VT - Keshawn King 1 yd Rush (Drive: 8 plays, 43 yards, 2:57; VT 13-10)
- (0:50) VT - Tucker Holloway 90 yd Punt Return (William Ross Kick) (VT 20-10)
- (0:00) GT - Gavin Stewart 27 yd Field Goal (Drive: 8 plays, 65 yards, 0:50; VT 20-13)

Third Quarter

- (7:56) GT - Gavin Stewart 22 yd Field Goal (Drive: 10 plays, 57 yards, 5:38; VT 20-16)
- (4:03) VT - Keli Lawson 7 yd Interception Return (William Ross Kick) (VT 27-16)

Fourth Quarter

- (9:02) GT – Nate McCollum 56 yd Pass From Zach Pyron (Drive: 5 plays, 90 yards, 1:36; VT 27–22)
- (3:30) GT - Zach Pyron 9 yd Rush (Drive: 9 plays, 73 yards, 3:24; GT 28-27)

Statistics	GT	VT
First downs	22	20
Total yards	463	304
Rush yards	210	138
Passing yards	253	166
Turnovers	1	2
Time of possession	33:12	26:48

Team	Category	Player	Statistics
Georgia Tech	Passing	Zach Pyron	19/32, 253 yards, TD
Georgia Tech	Rushing	Dontae Smith	9 carries, 85 yards, TD
Georgia Tech	Receiving	Nate McCollum	7 receptions, 103 yards, TD
Virginia Tech	Passing	Grant Wells	14/25, 164 yards
Virginia Tech	Rushing	Keshawn King	13 carries, 79 yards, TD
Virginia Tech	Receiving	Kaleb Smith	4 receptions, 78 yards

=== At Duke ===
Quarter	1	2	3	4	Total
Virginia Tech	7	0	0	0	7
Duke	3	7	7	7	24

at Wallace Wade Stadium • Durham, NC

- Date: November 12, 2022
- Game time: 12:00 p.m. EDT
- Game weather: sunny • Temperature: 64 °F (18 °C)
- Game attendance: 20,857
- Referee: Jerry Magallanes
- TV announcers (ACCRSN): Evan Lepler, Dave Archer, Rebecca Fiorentino

Game information

First Quarter

- (13:26) VT - Da'Wain Lofton 53 yd Pass From Grant Wells (John Love Kick) (Drive: 2 plays, 55 yards, 0:37; VT 7-0)
- (2:04) DUKE - Todd Pelino 25 yd Field Goal (Drive: 10 plays, 72 yards, 5:54; VT 7-3)

Second Quarter

- (6:32) DUKE – Nicky Dalmolin 24 yd Pass From Riley Leonard (Todd Pelino Kick) (Drive: 5 plays, 40 yards, 2:14; DUKE 10–7)

Third Quarter

- (7:55) DUKE - Riley Leonard 5 yd Rush (Todd Pelino Kick) (Drive: 11 plays, 62 yards, 5:19; DUKE 17-7)

Fourth Quarter

- (11:15) DUKE - Jontavis Robertson 6 yd Pass From Riley Leonard (Todd Pelino Kick) (Drive: 8 plays, 60 yards, 4:58; DUKE 27-7)

Statistics	VT	DUKE
First downs	13	20
Total yards	281	427
Rush yards	104	165
Passing yards	177	262
Turnovers	1	1
Time of possession	21:01	38:59

Team	Category	Player	Statistics
Virginia Tech	Passing	Grant Wells	16/28, 177 yards, TD
Virginia Tech	Rushing	Jalen Holston	7 carries, 35 yards
Virginia Tech	Receiving	Da'Wain Lofton	3 receptions, 75 yards, TD
Duke	Passing	Riley Leonard	19/31, 262 yards, 2 TD
Duke	Rushing	Jordan Waters	15 carries, 61 yards
Duke	Receiving	Jalon Calhoun	5 receptions, 94 yards

=== At Liberty ===
Quarter	1	2	3	4	Total
Virginia Tech	7	10	0	6	23
Liberty	7	10	5	0	22

at Williams Stadium • Lynchburg, VA

- Date: November 19, 2022
- Game time: 12:00 p.m. EDT
- Game weather: sunny • Temperature: 46 °F (8 °C)
- Game attendance: 23,055
- Referee: Jeff Flanagan
- TV announcers (ESPN+): Matt Warner, Joe Jauch, Emily Austen

Game information

First Quarter

- (6:57) VT - Jalen Holston 2 yd Rush (John Love Kick) (Drive: 8 plays, 80 yards, 4:10; VT 7-0)
- (2:34) LIB - Johnathan Bennett 15 yd Rush (Nick Brown Kick) (Drive: 8 plays, 89 yards, 3:02; 7-7)

Second Quarter

- (13:09) VT – Jalen Holston 5 yd Rush (John Love Kick) (Drive: 12 plays, 67 yards, 4:17; VT 14–7)
- (7:06) VT - John Love 23 yd Field Goal (Drive: 10 plays, 59 yards, 4:26; VT 17-7)
- (6:52) LIB - Shedro Louis 97 yd Kickoff Return (Nick Brown Kick) (VT 17-14)
- (0:05) LIB - Nick Brown 47 yd Field Goal (Drive: 8 plays, 51 yards, 0:57; 17-17)

Third Quarter

- (12:04) LIB - Grant Wells (VT) Sacked by Kendy Charles in the Endzone for a Safety (LIB 19-17)
- (3:50) LIB - Nick Brown 37 yd Field Goal (Drive: 9 plays, 57 yards, 3:37; LIB 22-17)

Fourth Quarter

- (7:46) VT - Jalen Holston 1 yd Rush (Drive: 13 plays, 64 yards, 5:31; VT 23-22)

Statistics	VT	LIB
First downs	19	20
Total yards	324	332
Rush yards	176	115
Passing yards	148	217
Turnovers	0	0
Time of possession	36:19	23:41

Team	Category	Player	Statistics
Virginia Tech	Passing	Grant Wells	14/20, 148 yards
Virginia Tech	Rushing	Jalen Holston	26 carries, 99 yards, 3 TD
Virginia Tech	Receiving	Nick Gallo	2 receptions, 45 yards
Liberty	Passing	Kaidon Salter	12/18, 119 yards
Liberty	Rushing	Shedro Louis	9 carries, 64 yards
Liberty	Receiving	DeMario Douglas	9 receptions, 69 yards

=== Virginia (Canceled) ===
	1	2	3	4	Total
Virginia					0
Virginia Tech					0

The game was canceled due to the 2022 University of Virginia shooting, which killed 3 players on Virginia's team.

== Roster ==
2022 Virginia Tech Hokies football team roster
Players
Coaches
Offense

Pos.	#	Name	Class
RB	0	Jalen Holston	Sr
QB	1	Jason Brown	Sr
WR	2	Jadan Blue	Sr
WR	3	Da'Wain Lofton	So
TE	4	Connor Blumrick	Sr
WR	5	Xayvion Turner-Bradshaw	Fr
QB	6	Grant Wells	Jr
QB	7	Devin Farrell	Fr
WR	11	Tucker Holloway	Fr
WR	12	Stephen Gosnell	Jr
TE	13	Dae'Quan Wright	Fr
WR	14	Cole Beck	GS
QB	15	Tahj Bullock	Fr
WR	16	Luke Bussel	Jr
WR	18	William Kakavitsas	Jr
QB	19	Ben Locklear	Fr
WR	20	P. J. Prioleau	Fr
RB	22	Bryce Duke	Fr
RB	23	Keshawn King	Jr
RB	24	Malachi Thomas	So
RB	27	Kenji Christian	Fr
RB	28	Chance Black	Fr
WR	34	Tink Boyd	Sr
WR	35	Sam Hughes	So
WR	37	Areeb Rashid	Fr
TE	38	Ty Eller	Sr
TE	40	Cole Pickett	Fr
WR	49	Ayden Burkey	Fr
WR	49	Latrell Sutton	Fr
OL	52	Tyler Smedley	Fr
OL	53	Nikolai Bujnowski	So
OL	55	Johnny Jordan	Sr
OL	58	Jack Hollifield	Fr
OL	59	Chris Boyd	Fr
OL	60	Silas Dzansi	Sr
OL	61	Braelin Moore	Fr
OL	62	Jonathan Kuhler	So
OL	63	Griffin Duggan	Fr
OL	64	Elijah Klock	Fr
OL	65	Xavier Chaplin	Fr
OL	66	Hunter Mclain	Fr
OL	68	Kaden Moore	So
OL	69	Dimitri Georgiadis	Sr
OL	70	Parker Clements	So
OL	71	Danijel Miletic	Fr
OL	72	Jesse Hanson	Jr
OL	74	William Jones	Fr
OL	75	Bob Schick	So
OL	76	Johnny Dickson	Fr
OL	77	Brody Meadows	Fr
OL	79	Johnny Garrett	Fr
WR	80	Kaleb Smith	Sr
WR	81	Dallan Wright	So
TE	82	Benji Gosnell	Fr
WR	85	Christian Moss	Fr
TE	86	Nick Gallo	Sr
TE	87	Harrison Saint Germain	Fr
WR	88	Jaylen Jones	So
TE	89	Drake De Iuliis	Sr
TE	99	Cole Reemsnyder	Fr

Defense

Pos.	#	Name	Class
LB	0	Pheldarius Payne	Sr
DB	1	Chamarri Conner	Sr
DL	2	Keyshawn Burgos	Fr
DL	3	Norell Pollard	Sr
LB	4	Dax Hollifield	Sr
DB	5	Nasir Peoples	Sr
DL	6	Josh Fuga	Jr
LB	7	Keonta Jenkins	Jr
DB	8	Brion Murray	Sr
DB	9	Armani Chatman	Sr
DB	11	Devin Alves	Fr
DB	12	Cam Johnson	Fr
DB	13	Ny'Quee Hawkins	Jr
DL	14	Kyree Moyston	Fr
LB	15	Keshon Artis	Sr
DL	17	Cole Nelson	So
LB	19	J. R. Walker	Jr
DB	20	D. J. Harvey	Fr
LB	21	Keli Lawson	Fr
DL	22	Mario Kendricks	Sr
DB	23	Mansoor Delane	Fr
LB	24	Jaden Keller	Fr
DB	26	Jalen Stroman	So
DB	27	Tyler Childress	Fr
DB	29	Nyke Johnson	Fr
LB	30	Tyler Matheny	Sr
S	31	Luke Shields	Fr
DL	32	Gunner Givens	Fr
DB	33	Miles Ellis	Fr
LB	34	Alan Tisdale	Sr
S	35	Cade Herdman	Fr
DB	36	Elijah Howard	Fr
S	37	Davion Ames	Fr
LB	38	Jayden McDonald	Fr
DL	39	Jorden McDonald	Fr
DB	40	Jalen Hoyle	Fr
DL	41	Jaylen Griffin	Sr
DL	43	Lakeem Rudolph	So
LB	44	Dorian Strong	Jr
DL	45	TyJuan Garbutt	Sr
DL	46	Eli Adams	Sr
LB	47	Dean Ferguson	Jr
LB	48	Matt Johnson	Jr
LB	50	Ben Skinner	Jr
DL	51	Khiari Miller	Fr
LB	53	Will Johnson	Fr
DL	54	Malachi Madison	Fr
DL	55	Lemar Law Jr.	Fr
DL	56	C. J. McCray	So
DL	90	Mattheus Carroll	Fr
DL	91	Wilfried Pene	So
DL	94	Nigel Simmons	Jr
DL	95	Desmond Mamudi	Fr
DL	99	Maxx Philpott	Jr

Special teams

Pos.	#	Name	Class
LS	42	Vincenzo Anthony	Jr
K	83	Kyle Lowe	So
P	85	Peter Moore	So
K	86	Zach Hoban	Jr
K	92	William Ross	Jr
P	93	Bryce LaFollette	Fr
K	95	Nick Veltsistas	Fr
LS	96	Christian Epling	Fr
K	97	John Love	Fr
LS	99	Justin Pollock	Jr

Head coach

- Brent Pry

Coordinators/assistant coaches

- J. C. Price – Associate head coach/Defensive linemen
- Tyler Bowen – Offensive coordinator/Tight ends
- Chris Marve – Defensive coordinator/Inside linebackers
- Stu Holt – Special teams coordinator/Running backs
- Derek Jones – Cornerbacks
- Shawn Quinn – Outside linebackers
- Pierson Prioleau – Safeties
- Joe Rudolph – Run game coordinator/Offensive linemen
- Fontel Mines – Wide receivers
- Brad Glenn – Pass game coordinator/Quarterbacks
- Dwight Galt IV – Director, Strength and Conditioning
- Greg Allen – Assistant Director of Strength and Conditioning
- Brandon Dillard – Assistant Director of Strength and Conditioning
- Jarrett Ferguson – Assistant Director of Strength and Conditioning
- Ryan Hardie – Assistant Director of Strength and Conditioning
- Xavier Adibi – Senior Analyst
- Brian Crist – Senior Analyst
- Jeff Carpenter – Analyst
- Jeron Gouveia-Winslow – Analyst
- Jan Johnson Jr. – Analyst
- Kerry Webb – Analyst
- Austin Fields – Graduate Assistant

Legend

- (C) Team captain
- (S) Suspended
- (I) Ineligible
- Injured
- Redshirt

Roster
Last update: 5/28/23
