= Justus Ross-Simmons =

American football player

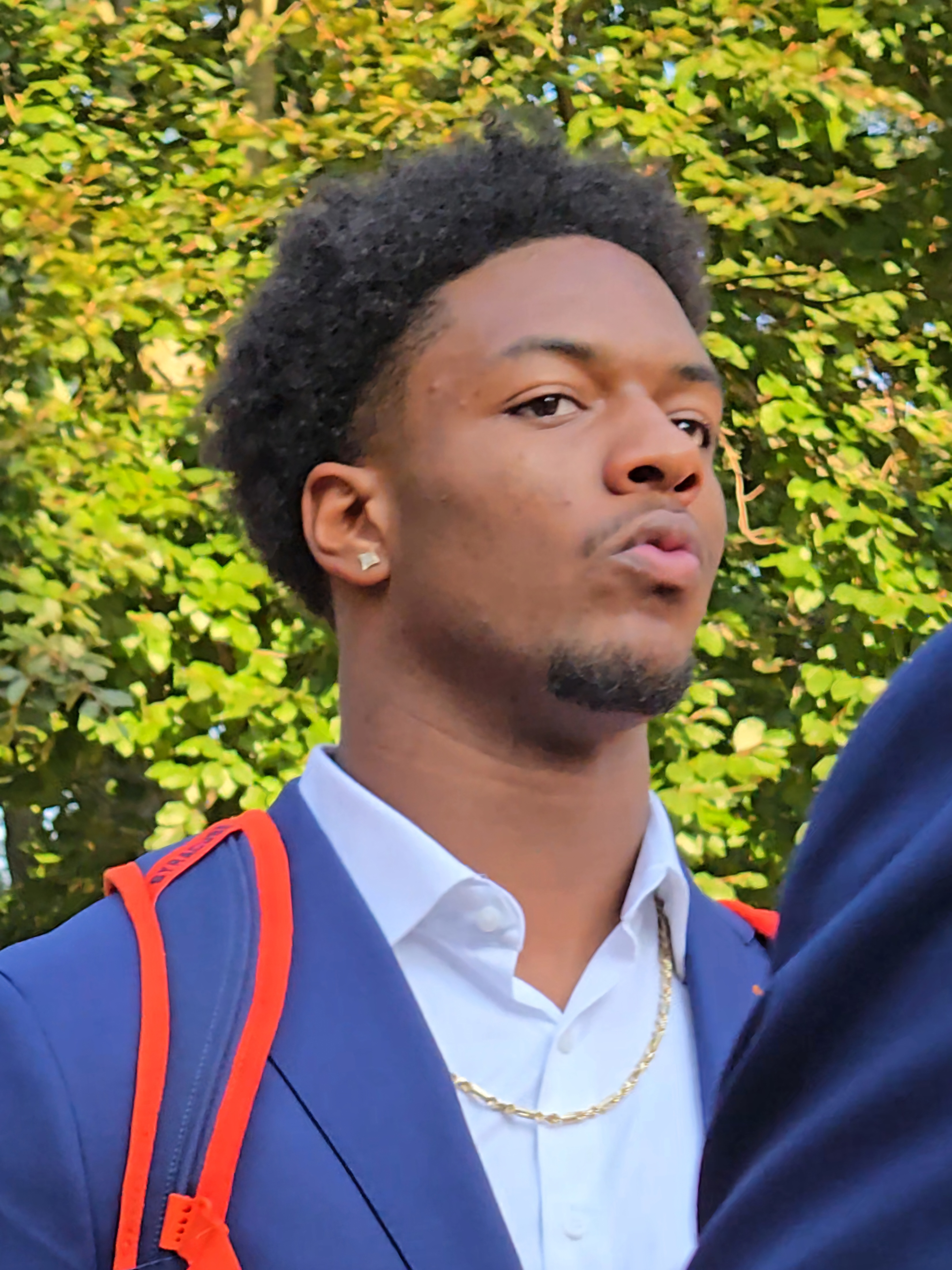
- Ross-Simmons at Syracuse University in 2024.

No. 12 – Syracuse Orange
- Position: Wide receiver
- Class: Junior

Personal information
- Listed height: 6 ft 2 in (1.88 m)
- Listed weight: 205 lb (93 kg)

Career information
- High school: Inglewood (Inglewood, California)
- College: Colorado State (2022–2023); Syracuse (2024–present)
- Stats at ESPN

Justus Ross-Simmons is an American college football wide receiver who currently plays for the Syracuse Orange. He previously played for the Colorado State Rams.

== Early life ==
Ross-Simmons grew up in Rochester, New York and attended East High School before transferring to Inglewood High School in Inglewood, California. He was rated as a two-star recruit and committed to play college football for the Colorado State Rams.

== College career ==
=== Colorado State ===
As a freshman in 2022, Ross-Simmons hauled in 26 receptions for 426 yards and three touchdowns. In the 2023 season opener, he notched five catches for 123 yards and a touchdown versus Washington State. Ross-Simmons finished the season with 45 receptions for 724 yards and three touchdowns. After the season, he entered his name into the NCAA transfer portal.

=== Syracuse ===
Ross-Simmons transferred to Syracuse Orange on April 24, 2024, to move closer to family. He was sidelined for the first half the season with an injury and got his first start against Virginia Tech. He caught his first-ever reception for the Orange for a 55-yard touchdown and caught a 28-yard touchdown in the 4th quarter.

== Professional career ==
Pre-draft measurables
Height	Weight	Arm length	Hand span	Wingspan	40-yard dash	10-yard split	20-yard split	Three-cone drill	Vertical jump	Broad jump
6 ft 2 1/4 in (1.89 m)	205 lb (93 kg)	33 in (0.84 m)	9 1/2 in (0.24 m)	6 ft 7 5/8 in (2.02 m)	4.71 s	1.63 s	2.63 s	7.27 s	34.0 in (0.86 m)	9 ft 9 in (2.97 m)
All values from Pro Day
