= 2025 Duke's Mayo Bowl =

Postseason college football bowl game

- 23rd Duke's Mayo Bowl
Minnesota Golden Gophers	Virginia Tech Hokies
(7–5)	(6–6)
Big Ten	ACC
24	10
Head coach: P. J. Fleck	Head coach: Brent Pry
	1	2	3	4	Total
Minnesota	0	21	0	3	24
Virginia Tech	7	3	0	0	10
- Date: January 3, 2025
- Season: 2024
- Stadium: Bank of America Stadium
- Location: Charlotte, North Carolina
- MVP: Elijah Spencer (WR, Minnesota)
- Favorite: Minnesota by 10.5
- Referee: Jason Autrey (SEC)
- Attendance: 31,927

United States TV coverage
- Network: ESPN
- Announcers: Matt Barrie (play-by-play), Aaron Murray (analyst), and Harry Lyles Jr. (sideline)

The 2025 Duke's Mayo Bowl was a college football bowl game played on January 3, 2025, at Bank of America Stadium located in Charlotte, North Carolina. The 23rd annual Duke's Mayo Bowl game featured Virginia Tech from the Atlantic Coast Conference (ACC) and Minnesota from the Big Ten Conference. The game began at approximately 7:30 p.m. EST and was aired on ESPN. The Duke's Mayo Bowl was one of the 2024–25 bowl games concluding the 2024 FBS football season. The game's title sponsor was Duke's Mayonnaise.

== Teams ==
Based on conference tie-ins, the game featured teams from the Atlantic Coast Conference and the Big Ten Conference. This was the first meeting between the Golden Gophers and the Hokies.

=== Minnesota Golden Gophers ===
Minnesota posted a 7–5 regular-season record (5–4 in Big Ten play). The Golden Gophers faced four ranked teams, defeating USC and Illinois while losing to Michigan and Penn State.

=== Virginia Tech Hokies ===
Virginia Tech ended their regular season with a 6–6 record (4–4 in ACC play). The Hokies faced two ranked teams, losing to Miami (FL) and Clemson.

== Game summary ==
2025 Duke's Mayo Bowl

Quarter	1	2	3	4	Total
Minnesota	0	21	0	3	24
Virginia Tech	7	3	0	0	10

at Bank of America Stadium • Charlotte, North Carolina

- Date: Friday, January 3, 2025
- Game time: 7:40 p.m. EST
- Game weather: Sunny • Temperature: 41 °F (5 °C) • Wind: 10 mph (16 km/h) west
- Game attendance: 31,927
- Referee: Jason Autrey
- TV announcers (ESPN): Matt Barrie (play-by-play), Aaron Murray (analyst), and Harry Lyles Jr. (sideline)
- Box score

Game information
First quarter
- (0:08) VT – Collin Schlee 3 yard run, John Love kick, (Drive: 8 plays, 80 yards, 3:57; Virginia Tech 7–0)

Second quarter

- (10:18) MINN – Elijah Spencer 10 yard pass from Darius Taylor, Dragan Kesich kick, (Drive: 9 plays, 80 yards, 4:50; Tied 7–7)
- (5:13) MINN – Elijah Spencer 12 yard pass from Max Brosmer, Dragan Kesich kick, (Drive: 8 plays, 65 yards, 4:02; Minnesota 14–7)
- (0:56) MINN – Darius Taylor 28 yard run, Dragan Kesich kick, (Drive: 6 plays, 58 yards, 0:52; Minnesota 21–7)
- (0:00) VT – John Love 60 yard field goal, (Drive: 5 plays, 38 yards, 0:56; Minnesota 21–10)

Third quarter

- No scoring.

Fourth quarter

- (11:59) MINN – Dragan Kesich 44 yard field goal, (Drive: 15 plays, 66 yards, 9:20; Minnesota 24–10)

=== Statistics ===
Statistics	MINN	VT
First downs	23	9
Plays–yards	67–403	48–223
Rushes–yards	36–167	30–74
Passing yards	236	149
Passing: comp–att–int	20–31–1	10–18–1
Time of possession	35:24	24:36

Team	Category	Player	Statistics
Minnesota	Passing	Max Brosmer	18/29, 211 yards, TD, INT
Minnesota	Rushing	Darius Taylor	20 carries, 113 yards, TD
Minnesota	Receiving	Elijah Spencer	6 receptions, 81 yards, 2 TD
Virginia Tech	Passing	William Watson III	8/12, 81 yards, INT
Virginia Tech	Rushing	Keylen Adams	1 carry, 47 yards
Virginia Tech	Receiving	Ayden Greene	6 receptions, 115 yards
