= Mansoor Delane =

American football player (born 2003)

No. 5 – Kansas City Chiefs
- Position: Cornerback
- Roster status: Active

Personal information
- Born: December 15, 2003 (age 22); Silver Spring, Maryland, U.S.
- Listed height: 6 ft 0 in (1.83 m)
- Listed weight: 190 lb (86 kg)

Career information
- High school: Archbishop Spalding (Severn, Maryland)
- College: Virginia Tech (2022–2024); LSU (2025)
- NFL draft: 2026: 1st round, 6th overall pick

Career history
- Kansas City Chiefs (2026–present)

Awards and highlights
- Unanimous All-American (2025); First-team All-SEC (2025); Third-team All-ACC (2024)

Career NFL statistics as of Week 10, 2026
- Tackles: 30
- Pass deflections: 7
- Interceptions: 1
- Stats at Pro Football Reference

Mansoor Delane (born December 15, 2003) is an American professional football cornerback for the Kansas City Chiefs of the National Football League (NFL). Delane played college football for the Virginia Tech Hokies and LSU Tigers and was selected sixth overall by the Chiefs in the 2026 NFL draft.

== Early life ==
Delane was born on December 15, 2003 and is one of five siblings. He was homeschooled until the second grade and began playing football at age 6. He attended Archbishop Spalding High School in Severn, Maryland, and was rated as a three-star recruit and committed to play college football for the Virginia Tech Hokies.

== College career ==
In week 10 of the 2022 season, Delane recorded his first career interception in a loss versus Duke. He finished the season with 38 tackles with three and a half being for a loss, eight pass deflections, an interception, and two forced fumbles in eight games, earning FWAA freshman All-American honors. In 2023, Delane notched 54 tackles with two and a half going for a loss, a pass deflection, an interception, and a fumble recovery. Following the season, Delane announced that he would transfer to the LSU Tigers.

== Professional career ==
Pre-draft measurables
| Height | Weight | Arm length | Hand span | Wingspan | 40-yard dash | 10-yard split | 20-yard split |
|---|---|---|---|---|---|---|---|
| 5 ft 11 3/4 in (1.82 m) | 187 lb (85 kg) | 30 in (0.76 m) | 8 7/8 in (0.23 m) | 6 ft 2 1/2 in (1.89 m) | 4.38 s | 1.50 s | 2.52 s |
All values from NFL Combine/Pro Day

Delane was selected by the Kansas City Chiefs in the first round with the sixth overall pick of the 2026 NFL draft. On June 8, 2026, he signed a four-year, $41.6 million contract with the Chiefs.

== Career statistics ==
=== College ===
| Year | Team | Games | | Tackles | | | | | Interceptions | | | | | |
| Year | Team | GP | GS | Cmb | Solo | Ast | TFL | Sck | PD | Int | Yds | Avg | Lng | TD |
|---|---|---|---|---|---|---|---|---|---|---|---|---|---|---|
| 2022 | Virginia Tech | 8 | 4 | 38 | 17 | 21 | 3.5 | 0.0 | 8 | 1 | 0 | 0.0 | 0 | 0 |
| 2023 | Virginia Tech | 13 | 13 | 54 | 31 | 23 | 2.5 | 0.0 | 1 | 1 | 32 | 32.0 | 32 | 0 |
| 2024 | Virginia Tech | 12 | 12 | 54 | 34 | 20 | 1.0 | 0.0 | 7 | 4 | 0 | 0.0 | 0 | 0 |
| 2025 | LSU | 11 | 11 | 45 | 26 | 19 | 0.0 | 0.0 | 11 | 2 | 0 | 0.0 | 0 | 0 |
| Career | | 44 | 40 | 191 | 108 | 83 | 7.0 | 0.0 | 27 | 8 | 32 | 4.0 | 32 | 0 |

== Personal life ==
Delane is a practicing Muslim and regularly wears "All Praise Due to Allah" on his eyeblack. He also observes Ramadan and fasts. His brother Faheem is a safety for the LSU team.
