= Stephen Gosnell =

American football player (born 2001)

No. 89 – Buffalo Bills
- Position: Wide receiver
- Roster status: Practice squad

Personal information
- Born: October 22, 2001 (age 25); Pilot Mountain, North Carolina, U.S.
- Listed height: 6 ft 2 in (1.88 m)
- Listed weight: 198 lb (90 kg)

Career information
- High school: East Surry (Pilot Mountain)
- College: North Carolina (2020–2021); Virginia Tech (2022–2024)
- NFL draft: 2025: undrafted

Career history
- Buffalo Bills (2025–present)*
- * Offseason or practice squad member only
- Stats at Pro Football Reference

Stephen Gosnell (born October 22, 2001) is an American professional football wide receiver for the Buffalo Bills of the National Football League (NFL). He played college football for the North Carolina Tar Heels and the Virginia Tech Hokies.

== College career ==
Gosnell played college football for the North Carolina Tar Heels from 2020 to 2021 and the Virginia Tech Hokies from 2022 to 2024.

=== College statistics ===
Legend
**Bold**	Career high

Year	Team	Games		Receiving				Fumbles	
Year	Team	GP	GS	Rec	Yds	Avg	TD	Fum	Lost
2020	North Carolina	4	0	0	0	0.0	0	0	0
2021	North Carolina	10	0	2	11	5.5	0	0	0
2022	Virginia Tech	9	1	10	134	13.4	0	0	0
2023	Virginia Tech	**13**	**12**	22	348	15.8	**3**	0	0
2024	Virginia Tech	**13**	10	**28**	**506**	**18.1**	1	0	0
Career		49	23	62	999	16.1	4	0	0

== Professional career ==
Pre-draft measurables
Height	Weight	Arm length	Hand span	Wingspan	40-yard dash	10-yard split	20-yard split	20-yard shuttle	Three-cone drill	Vertical jump	Broad jump
6 ft 1 5/8 in (1.87 m)	198 lb (90 kg)	32 1/4 in (0.82 m)	9 1/4 in (0.23 m)	6 ft 5 in (1.96 m)	4.56 s	1.60 s	2.68 s	4.15 s	6.96 s	34.5 in (0.88 m)	10 ft 0 in (3.05 m)
All values from Pro Day

After not being selected in the 2025 NFL draft, Gosnell signed with the Buffalo Bills as an undrafted free agent. On August 26, 2025, he was waived by the team before being signed to the practice squad the following day. On January 19, 2026, Gosnell signed a reserve/futures contract with Buffalo.

On August 30, 2026, Gosnell was waived by the Bills as a part of final roster cuts; he was re-signed to the team's practice squad the next day.
