= Shawn Quinn (American football) =

American football player and coach (born 1972)

Current position
- Title: Defensive Coordinator and Outside Linebackers Coach
- Team: Liberty
- Conference: CUSA

Biographical details
- Born: March 1972 (age 54); Chicago, Illinois, U.S.
- Education: Lincoln Memorial University

Playing career
- 1992–1995: Carson Newman
- Position: Defensive lineman

Coaching career (HC unless noted)
- 1995: Armuchee High School (GA) (OLB/TE)
- 1996–1999: Maryville High School (TN) (DC/DL)
- 1999–2001: Tennessee (GA)
- 2002–2007: Louisiana–Lafayette (DL)
- 2008: LSU (DE)
- 2009: Northwestern State (Co-DC)
- 2010–2011: Georgia Southern (LB/RC)
- 2012: Charleston Southern (DC/LB)
- 2013–2015: Western Carolina (DC/LB)
- 2016: Tennessee Tech (AHC/DC/LB)
- 2017: The Citadel (DA)
- 2018: Savannah State (DC/LB)
- 2019–2021: Savannah State
- 2022–2025: Virginia Tech (OLB)
- 2026–present: Liberty (DC/OLB)

Head coaching record
- Overall: 16–6

Accomplishments and honors

Awards
- Black College Sports Network Coach of the Year (2019)

Shawn William Quinn (born March 1972) is an American football coach and former player. Quinn is the Defensive Coordinator and Outside Linebackers coach at Liberty University, a position he has held since January 3, 2026. Quinn served as outside linebackers coach at Virginia Tech from 2022 to 2025 and was the head football coach at Savannah State University in from 2019 to 2021. He played college football at Carson–Newman University from 1992 to 1995.

== Early life and education ==
Quinn is a native of Chicago. In 1995, Quinn earned a degree in history and political science from Carson–Newman University, a small, private college located in Jefferson City, Tennessee. After attending Carson–Newman, Quinn received a master's degree from Lincoln Memorial University in Harrogate, Tennessee.

== Coaching career ==
=== Assistant coaching career ===
Among various stops, Quinn has coached under Jeff Monken at Georgia Southern, under Les Miles at LSU, under Phillip Fulmer at Tennessee, and Rickey Bustle at Louisiana–Lafayette.

Working under Fulmer as a graduate assistant for offense, Quinn coached in three bowl games while at Tennessee: 2000 Fiesta Bowl, 2001 Cotton Bowl Classic, and 2002 Florida Citrus Bowl.

=== Head coaching career ===
After one season as defensive coordinator for Savannah State, Quinn took over as the head coach. In his first season of 2019, the Tigers had a 7–3 season—the first winning season since 1998.

In 2021, the Tigers were 8–2 overall and 5–1 in conference. Their only two losses came on the road to Valdosta State and Albany State, two teams that made the NCAA Division II playoffs.

=== Virginia Tech ===
In December 2021, Quinn was the first assistant to join Brent Pry's Hokies staff as a defensive assistant. Pry and Quinn previous served together on staffs at Georgia Southern and Louisiana–Lafayette.

=== Liberty ===
On January 3, 2026, Quinn was named the Flames' Defensive Coordinator and Outside Linebackers coach.

== Head coaching record ==
Year	Team	Overall	Conference	Standing	Bowl/playoffs
Savannah State Tigers (Southern Intercollegiate Athletic Conference ) (2019–2021)
2019	Savannah State	7–3	5–0	1st (East)	
2020–21	Savannah State	1–1	0–0	N/A	
2021	Savannah State	8–2	5–1	2nd (East)	
Savannah State:		16–6	10–1		
Total:		16–6			
