= Jalen Stroman =

American football player (born 2003)

No. 38 – San Francisco 49ers
- Position: Safety
- Roster status: Practice squad

Personal information
- Born: May 22, 2003 (age 23)
- Listed height: 6 ft 0 in (1.83 m)
- Listed weight: 203 lb (92 kg)

Career information
- High school: Patriot (Nokesville, Virginia)
- College: Virginia Tech (2021–2024); Notre Dame (2025)
- NFL draft: 2026: undrafted

Career history
- San Francisco 49ers (2026–present)*
- * Offseason or practice squad member only
- Stats at Pro Football Reference

Jalen Stroman (born May 22, 2003) is an American professional football safety for the San Francisco 49ers of the National Football League (NFL). He played college football for the Virginia Tech Hokies and Notre Dame Fighting Irish.

== Early life ==
Stroman attended Patriot High School in Nokesville, Virginia. Coming out of high school, he was rated as a three-star recruit by 247Sports and committed to play college football for the Virginia Tech Hokies over offers from Duke and Virginia.

== College career ==
=== Virginia Tech ===
In his first two seasons in 2021 and 2022, Stroman played in 24 games, totaling 51 tackles, two pass deflections, and two forced fumbles. In 2023, he recorded 55 tackles and four pass deflections. In the 2024 season, Stroman played in just one game before suffering a season-ending injury. After the season, he entered the NCAA transfer portal.

=== Notre Dame ===
Stroman transferred to play for the Notre Dame Fighting Irish. In week 13 of the 2025 season, he intercepted a pass which he returned 44 yards for a touchdown, while also blocking a punt in a blowout win over Syracuse. Stroman finished the season with 37 tackles with three being for a loss, a sack, an interception, and a touchdown. After the season, he accepted an invite to the 2026 Senior Bowl.

=== Statistics ===
Year	Team	GP	Tackles				Interceptions				Fumbles		
Year	Team	GP	Total	Solo	Ast	Sack	PD	Int	Yds	TD	FF	FR	TD
2021	Virginia Tech	13	8	5	3	0.0	0	0	0	0	0	0	0
2022	Virginia Tech	11	43	22	21	0.0	2	0	0	0	2	0	0
2023	Virginia Tech	11	55	24	31	0.0	2	0	0	0	0	0	0
2024	Virginia Tech	1	5	4	1	0.0	0	0	0	0	0	0	0
2025	Notre Dame	12	37	30	7	1.0	2	1	44	1	0	0	0
Career		48	148	85	63	1.0	6	1	44	1	2	0	0

== Professional career ==
Pre-draft measurables
Height	Weight	Arm length	Hand span	Wingspan	40-yard dash	10-yard split	20-yard split	20-yard shuttle	Three-cone drill	Vertical jump	Broad jump	Bench press
6 ft 0 3/8 in (1.84 m)	203 lb (92 kg)	31 5/8 in (0.80 m)	8 7/8 in (0.23 m)	6 ft 4 1/4 in (1.94 m)	4.73 s	1.67 s	2.63 s	4.41 s	7.18 s	36.0 in (0.91 m)	10 ft 3 in (3.12 m)	14 reps
All values from Pro Day

Stroman signed with the San Francisco 49ers as an undrafted free agent on April 26, 2026. On August 30, Stroman was waived by the 49ers as a part of final roster cuts; he was re-signed to the team's practice squad the next day.

== Personal life ==
Stroman is the younger brother of NFL cornerback, Greg Stroman.
