= Derek Jones (American football) =

American football coach and former player

Current position
- Title: Cornerbacks coach
- Team: Tennessee
- Conference: SEC
- Annual salary: $550,000

Biographical details
- Born: Woodruff, South Carolina, U.S.
- Education: Ole Miss

Playing career
- 1993–1996: Ole Miss
- N/A: Toronto Argonauts
- N/A: Edmonton Eskimos
- 1997: Nashville Kats
- Position: Cornerback

Coaching career (HC unless noted)
- 1998–1999: Ole Miss (GA)
- 2000–2004: Murray State (CB/RC)
- 2005: Middle Tennessee State (DB)
- 2006: Tulsa (CB)
- 2007: Memphis (CB)
- 2008–2014: Duke (DB/assistant ST)
- 2015–2017: Duke (CB/assistant ST)
- 2018–2019: Duke (AHC/DB)
- 2020–2021: Texas Tech (AHC/co-DC/DB)
- 2022–2025: Virginia Tech (CB)
- 2026–present: Tennessee (CB)

Derek Jones is an American college football coach and former professional player. Jones is currently the cornerbacks coach for the Tennessee Volunteers, serving under head coach Josh Heupel and defensive coordinator Jim Knowles. He played cornerback in the Canadian Football League (CFL) and Arena Football League (AFL).

== Early life ==
Jones was born in Woodruff, South Carolina. He later earned a degree in Public Administration from Ole Miss, where he also played as a cornerback. Jones also played in the CFL for the Toronto Argonauts and the Edmonton Eskimos. Jones played in the AFL for the Nashville Kats.

== Coaching career ==
=== Assistant coaching career ===
A coaching veteran, Jones has been an assistant coach at numerous stops and has worked under several head coaches, including David Cutcliffe at Duke and Ole Miss, Tommy West at Memphis, Steve Kragthorpe at Tulsa, Joe Pannunzio at Murray State, and, most recently, Matt Wells at Texas Tech.

=== Virginia Tech ===
During December 2021, Coach Brent Pry announced that Jones would be joining his new staff as a defensive assistant at Virginia Tech.

=== Tennessee Volunteers ===
February 15, 2026
