= Stu Holt =

American football player and coach (born 1972)

Current position
- Title: Special teams coordinator & offensive assistant
- Team: Virginia Tech
- Conference: ACC
- Annual salary: $500,000

Biographical details
- Born: December 13, 1972 (age 53); Hamptonville, North Carolina, U.S.
- Education: University of North Carolina (1995); Western Carolina University (2000)

Playing career
- 1992–1995: North Carolina
- Position: Long snapper

Coaching career (HC unless noted)
- 1996: Norwich (ST/LB)
- 1997: Mainland HS (FL) (RB)
- 1998–1999: Western Carolina (GA)
- 2000: Cumberland (TN) (ST/DL)
- 2001: Bethune–Cookman (ST/ILB)
- 2002–2003: New Smyrna Beach HS (FL)
- 2004: Western Kentucky (RB)
- 2005: Western Kentucky (ST/RB)
- 2006–2008: Western Kentucky (RB)
- 2009: Western Kentucky (ST/RB)
- 2010: Tennessee State (RB)
- 2011: Western Kentucky (RGC/TE)
- 2012: Western Kentucky (TE)
- 2013: South Florida (ST)
- 2014: South Florida (ST/TE)
- 2015: Appalachian State (RB)
- 2016–2018: Appalachian State (ST/RB)
- 2019–2021: Louisville (ST/TE)
- 2022: Virginia Tech (AHC/ST/RB)
- 2023–2024: Virginia Tech (AHC/ST/TE)
- 2025–present: Virginia Tech (ST/off. assistant)

Stu Holt (born December 13, 1972) is an American college football coach and former player. He is the special teams coordinator and an offensive assistant for Virginia Tech, a position he has held since 2025. He played college football for North Carolina from 1992 to 1995.

== Playing career ==
Holt played for North Carolina under Mack Brown from 1992 to 1995, as a long snapper for the Tar Heels.

== Coaching career ==
=== Early Coaching Career ===
Holt began his coaching career at Norwich University in 1996 as the team's special teams coordinator and linebackers coach. In 1997, he worked as a running backs coach at Mainland High School in Florida. From 1998 to 199,9 he worked as a graduate assistant at Western Carolina. Then he worked with the defensive line and special teams at Cumberland. In 2001, he was at Bethune–Cookman as the inside linebackers and special teams coach. The following two years he served as the head coach at New Smyrna Beach H.S. in New Smyrna Beach, Florida.

=== Western Kentucky ===
From 2004 to 2009, Holt coached at Western Kentucky, as the team's running backs coach, where he also worked as the team's special teams coordinator in 2005 and 2009. In 2010, he spent one year as the running backs coach with one season at Tennessee State before returning to Western Kentucky. In 2011 and 2012, he coached tackles and tight ends for Western Kentucky.

=== USF ===
Holt spent 2013 and 2014 at the University of South Florida, where he was serving as the Bulls' tight ends coach and special teams coordinator. He was originally hired at USF as director of player personnel in 2013, but ultimately was made the team's special teams coordinator prior to the 2013 season. Holt was nominated for the Broyles Award at the end of the season after USF's special teams improved in almost every statistical category, even with the loss of key performers. In 2014, he added the responsibility of coaching the tight ends for the Bulls.

=== Appalachian State ===
In 2015 Holt became the running backs coach for Appalachian State. In 2016 he added the special teams duties which held until 2018.

=== Louisville ===
Holt followed Scott Satterfield and was hired as the tight ends coach and special teams coordinator at Louisville in December 2018. He coached at Louisville until the end of the 2021 season.

=== Virginia Tech ===
Brent Pry announced on December 10, 2021, that Stu Holt would join his staff and serve as the special teams coordinator/running backs coach for the Virginia Tech Hokies.
