= Aycen Stevens =

American football player

No. 42 – Virginia Tech Hokies
- Position: Defensive end
- Class: Junior

Personal information
- Listed height: 6 ft 5 in (1.96 m)
- Listed weight: 264 lb (120 kg)

Career information
- High school: Decatur Central (Indianapolis, Indiana)
- College: Virginia Tech (2023–present)
- Stats at ESPN

Aycen Wade Stevens is an American college football defensive end for the Virginia Tech Hokies.

== Early life ==
Stevens attended Decatur Central High School in Indianapolis, Indiana, where he was a linebacker and quarterback. During his high school career he had 160 tackles. He committed to Virginia Tech to play college football.

== College career ==
Stevens redshirted his first year at Virginia Tech in 2023. Prior to the 2024 season he switched from linebacker to defensive end and recorded three tackles over 13 games. In 2025, Stevens played in 12 games and had 14 tackles. He returned to Virginia Tech in 2026 as a first-year starter.

== Personal life ==
His brother, Tommy Stevens, was a college football quarterback and plays in the Canadian Football League (CFL).
