= Tyler Bowen =

American football player and coach (born 1989)

Ohio State Buckeyes
- Title: Offensive line coach

Personal information
- Born: July 12, 1989 (age 37); Helena, Georgia, U.S.

Career information
- High school: Telfair County (McRae, Georgia)
- College: Maryland

Career history
- Maryland (2010) Student assistant; Maryland (2011–2012) Graduate assistant; Towson (2013) Tight ends coach; Penn State (2014) Graduate assistant; Fordham (2015) Offensive line coach; Fordham (2016) Offensive coordinator & offensive line coach; Maryland (2017) Offensive line coach; Penn State (2018–2019) Tight ends coach & offensive recruiting coordinator; Penn State (2019) Interim offensive coordinator; Penn State (2020) Co-offensive coordinator, offensive recruiting coordinator & tight ends coach; Jacksonville Jaguars (2021) Tight ends coach; Virginia Tech (2022) Offensive coordinator & tight ends coach; Virginia Tech (2023–2024) Offensive coordinator & quarterbacks coach; Ohio State (2025–present) Offensive line coach

Tyler Bowen (born July 12, 1989) is an American football coach who is the offensive line coach at Ohio State. He previously served as the offensive coordinator and quarterbacks coach at Virginia Tech, prior to that, Bowen was the tight ends coach for the Jacksonville Jaguars of the National Football League (NFL), an assistant coach at Penn State, Maryland, Fordham, and Towson.

== Early life and playing career ==
Bowen is a native of Helena, Georgia.

From 2007 to 2009, Bowen played college football as an offensive lineman at the University of Maryland, College Park. During the 2010 season under the tutelage of head coach Ralph Friedgen and offensive coordinator James Franklin, he helped Maryland post a 9–4 record.

== Coaching career ==
=== Maryland ===
Bowen began his coaching career at his alma mater, the University of Maryland, College Park, as a graduate assistant under head coach Randy Edsall. During his two seasons as a graduate assistant at Maryland, Bowen worked with the offensive linemen and the wide receivers.

=== Towson ===
In 2013, Bowen joined as the tight ends coach at Towson University. In Bowen's first and only season coaching at Towson, the Tigers advanced to the FCS Championship Game and finished No. 2 in the country.

=== Penn State ===
In 2014, Bowen was hired as an offensive graduate assistant at Penn State University under head coach James Franklin. Bowen spent the season primarily assisting with the offensive line.

=== Fordham ===
In 2015, Bowen joined Fordham as their offensive line coach under head coach Joe Moorhead and was promoted to offensive coordinator under head coach Andrew Breiner in 2016.

=== Maryland (second stint) ===
In 2017, Bowen returned to the University of Maryland, College Park as their offensive line coach under head coach D. J. Durkin.

=== Penn State (second stint) ===
In 2018, Bowen rejoined Penn State University as their tight ends coach and offensive recruiting coordinator under head coach James Franklin. In his first season in coaching tight ends, true freshman Pat Freiermuth finished second among FBS tight ends with eight touchdowns. Freiermuth claimed The Athletic All-America and All-Big Ten honorable mention recognition for his efforts. In 2019, Bowen was named the interim offensive coordinator following the departure of Ricky Rahne, who left to become the head coach at Old Dominion University. In 2020, Bowen was promoted to co-offensive coordinator while retaining his roles as the offensive recruiting coordinator and tight ends coach.

=== Jacksonville Jaguars ===
On February 1, 2021, Bowen was hired by the Jacksonville Jaguars as their tight ends coach under head coach Urban Meyer.

=== Virginia Tech ===
Bowen became the offensive coordinator for Virginia Tech in 2022. In 2022, he was also the tight ends coach. In 2023, he became the Quarterbacks coach.

=== Ohio State ===
On February 5, 2025, Bowen was hired as the offensive line coach at Ohio State.

== Personal life ==
Bowen is married to his wife, Ginny, and they have one daughter and son together. Bowen earned his bachelor's degree in communication and master's degree in minority and urban education from the University of Maryland, College Park.
