= Fontel Mines =

American football player and coach (born 1985)

Virginia Tech Hokies
- Title: Assistant head coach & wide receivers coach

Personal information
- Born: February 26, 1985 (age 41); Richmond, Virginia, U.S.
- Listed height: 6 ft 4 in (1.93 m)
- Listed weight: 244 lb (111 kg)

Career information
- College: Virginia
- NFL draft: 2007: undrafted

Career history

Playing
- Chicago Bears (2007–2009)

Coaching
- Chowan (2011) Wide receivers coach; Richmond (2012–2013) Wide receivers coach; Richmond (2014) Tight ends coach; Richmond (2015) Wide receivers coach; Washington Redskins (2015) Minority internship; Delaware (2016) Wide receivers coach; James Madison (2017) Inside receivers coach; East Carolina (2018–2020) Inside receivers coach & recruiting coordinator; Old Dominion (2021) Tight ends coach; Virginia Tech (2022–2023) Wide receivers coach; Virginia Tech (2024–present) Assistant head coach & wide receivers coach

Fontel Mines (born February 26, 1985) is an American football coach and former tight end. He is the assistant head coach, wide receivers coach, and offensive recruiting coordinator for Virginia Tech. He previously was the tight end coach for the Old Dominion Monarchs. He played college football at Virginia for coach Al Groh from 2002 to 2006 and played in the National Football League (NFL) for 3 seasons from 2007 to 2009.

== Early life ==
Mines attended Hermitage High School in Richmond, Virginia and was a student and a letterman in football and basketball. In football, as a senior, he was a first-team Group AAA All-state selection and made 37 receptions for 674 yards and ten touchdowns.

== College career ==
Mines played collegiately at the University of Virginia. He played in 42 games, starting 20. He had 68 career receptions for 737 yards and 5 touchdowns.

== Professional career ==
=== Chicago Bears ===
Mines was signed to the Chicago Bears practice squad on September 2, 2007. They signed him to the active roster on December 26, 2007.

After spending the 2008 season on the Bears' practice squad, Mines was re-signed to a future contract on December 29, 2008. He was waived/injured on August 25 and subsequently reverted to injured reserve.

Mines was waived by the Bears on March 1, 2010.
