= Dorian Strong =

American football player (born 2002)

No. 43 – Buffalo Bills
- Position: Cornerback
- Roster status: Non-football injury

Personal information
- Born: March 14, 2002 (age 24); Upper Marlboro, Maryland, U.S.
- Listed height: 6 ft 1 in (1.85 m)
- Listed weight: 185 lb (84 kg)

Career information
- High school: Dr. Henry A. Wise Jr. (Upper Marlboro, Maryland)
- College: Virginia Tech (2020–2024)
- NFL draft: 2025: 6th round, 177th overall pick

Career history
- Buffalo Bills (2025)

Awards and highlights
- Third-team All-ACC (2023)

Career NFL statistics as of 2025
- Tackles: 10
- Stats at Pro Football Reference

Dorian Strong (born March 14, 2002) is an American professional football cornerback. He played college football for the Virginia Tech Hokies and was selected by the Buffalo Bills in the sixth round of the 2025 NFL draft.

== Early life ==
Strong attended Dr. Henry A. Wise Jr. High School in Upper Marlboro, Maryland, where he played cornerback and wide receiver. As a senior, he had 33 tackles on defense and had 17 receptions for 425 yards and eight touchdowns. He committed to Virginia Tech to play college football.

== College career ==
As a true freshman at Virginia Tech in 2020, Strong started five of 11 games and had 22 tackles and one interception. As a sophomore in 2021, he started 10 of 13 games, recording 23 tackles and one interception. In 2022, he played in the first four games of the season before suffering a season-ending hand injury. Strong returned from the injury to start all 13 games in 2023 and had 25 tackles and three interceptions. He returned to Virginia Tech for the 2024 season.

== Professional career ==
Pre-draft measurables
Height	Weight	Arm length	Hand span	Wingspan	40-yard dash	10-yard split	20-yard split	20-yard shuttle	Three-cone drill	Vertical jump	Broad jump	Bench press
6 ft 1 in (1.85 m)	185 lb (84 kg)	30 7/8 in (0.78 m)	9 1/4 in (0.23 m)	6 ft 4 1/8 in (1.93 m)	4.50 s	1.55 s	2.61 s	4.08 s	6.56 s	36.0 in (0.91 m)	10 ft 0 in (3.05 m)	15 reps
All values from NFL Combine/Pro Day

Strong was selected by the Buffalo Bills with the 177th pick in the sixth round of the 2025 NFL draft. In his rookie season, Strong recorded 10 tackles in 4 games. In Week 4 against the New Orleans Saints, Strong suffered a neck injury, which ended his season. On February 1, 2026, general manager Brandon Beane revealed that Strong's playing career was in jeopardy due to the injury. Beane also revealed that Strong was scheduled to have an upcoming procedure that would determine whether he could continue with his playing career. Strong was waived by the Bills on June 11. He cleared waivers and reverted to the team's injured reserve soon after.
