= Chris Marve =

American football player and coach (born 1989)

Current position
- Title: Defensive coordinator & linebackers coach
- Team: Colorado
- Conference: Big 12

Biographical details
- Born: March 1, 1989 (age 37); Fort Worth, Texas, U.S.

Playing career
- 2007–2011: Vanderbilt
- Position: Linebacker

Coaching career (HC unless noted)
- 2014: Vanderbilt (DQC)
- 2015: Vanderbilt (GA)
- 2016–2018: Vanderbilt (ILB)
- 2019: Mississippi State (DRC/LB)
- 2020–2021: Florida State (LB)
- 2022–2024: Virginia Tech (DC/ILB)
- 2026–present: Colorado (DC/LB)

Accomplishments and honors

Awards
- As player: 3× Second-team All-SEC (2009, 2010, 2011); Freshman All-American (2008)

Christopher Ryan Marve (born March 1, 1989) is an American college football coach and former linebacker who is the defensive coordinator and linebackers coach at the University of Colorado Boulder. He previously served as the defensive coordinator and inside linebackers coach at Virginia Tech from 2022 to 2024.

Marve played college football at Vanderbilt as a linebacker from 2007 to 2011. He began his coaching career at Vanderbilt in 2014 and also previously served as an assistant coach at Mississippi State University and Florida State University.

== Early life ==
Marve attended White Station High School in Memphis, Tennessee, where he was two-year team captain and team MVP. He was voted Tennessee 5A Mr. Football Lineman of the Year in 2007, the first recipient ever from White Station. He helped the Spartans to a 12-2 overall record in 2006 and the 5A state semifinals, recording 178 total tackles, including 133 solo stops, four QB sacks and eight forced fumbles as a senior.

Considered only a two-star recruit by Rivals.com, Marve was not ranked among the nation's top linebacker prospects. He committed to Vanderbilt, from which he received his only scholarship offer, on June 7, 2006.

== Playing career ==
After redshirting his first year at Vanderbilt, Marve started as a redshirt freshman and registered a team-best 51 solo stops, 6.5 tackles for loss, and three quarterback sacks. He was named to College Football News′ All-Freshman first team, as well as Rivals.com′s 2008 Freshman All-America team.

Marve also was a member of the Nu Rho chapter of Kappa Alpha Psi fraternity at Vanderbilt.

== Coaching career ==
=== Vanderbilt ===
In 2014, Marve began his coaching career as a defensive quality control coach at his alma mater Vanderbilt University under head coach Derek Mason. In 2015, he served as a graduate assistant. In 2016, Marve was promoted to inside linebackers coach.

=== Mississippi State ===
On March 1, 2019, Marve was named the defensive run game coordinator and linebackers coach under head coach Joe Moorhead.

=== Florida State ===
On December 24, 2019, Marve was hired as the linebackers coach at Florida State University under head coach Mike Norvell.

=== Virginia Tech ===
On December 7, 2021, Marve was hired at Virginia Tech as their defensive coordinator and inside linebackers coach under head coach Brent Pry. On December 12, 2024, Marve was fired from Virginia Tech.

=== Colorado ===
On December 20, 2025, Marve was hired as the linebackers coach at the University of Colorado Boulder under head coach Deion Sanders. On February 28, 2026, Marve was promoted to defensive coordinator and linebackers coach.
