= Keonta Jenkins =

American football player (born 2002)

No. 49 – Buffalo Bills
- Position: Linebacker
- Roster status: Practice squad

Personal information
- Born: January 26, 2002 (age 24); Jacksonville, Florida, U.S.
- Listed height: 6 ft 2 in (1.88 m)
- Listed weight: 211 lb (96 kg)

Career information
- High school: Jean Ribault (Jacksonville, Florida)
- College: Virginia Tech (2020–2024)
- NFL draft: 2025: undrafted

Career history
- Buffalo Bills (2025–present)

Career NFL statistics as of 2025
- Tackles: 9
- Games played: 3
- Stats at Pro Football Reference

Keonta Jenkins (born January 26, 2002) is an American professional football linebacker for the Buffalo Bills of the National Football League (NFL). He played college football for the Virginia Tech Hokies and was signed by the Bills as an undrafted free agent in 2025.

== Early life ==
Jenkins was born in Jacksonville, Florida. He attended Jean Ribault High School in Jacksonville where he played football as a wide receiver, cornerback and safety. Ranked a three-star recruit, he had nearly 20 scholarship offers from NCAA Division I teams and committed to play college football for the Virginia Tech Hokies.

== College career ==
Jenkins opened his true freshman season at Virginia Tech in 2020 as a starter at safety. That year, he appeared in eight games, two as a starter, posting 10 tackles. He then had one start in 12 games in 2021, tallying 17 tackles with two pass breakups. He started nine of 11 games during the 2022 season, posting 40 tackles, an interception and three pass breakups. He then had 10 starts in 2023 and made 50 tackles with 10 tackles-for-loss (TFLs), two forced fumbles and an interception. As a senior in 2024, Jenkins posted 65 tackles, a sack and an interception. He concluded his collegiate career with 184 tackles, 2.5 sacks, three interceptions and nine pass deflections.

== Professional career ==
Pre-draft measurables
| Height | Weight | Arm length | Hand span | Wingspan | 40-yard dash | 10-yard split | 20-yard split | 20-yard shuttle | Three-cone drill | Vertical jump | Broad jump | Bench press |
|---|---|---|---|---|---|---|---|---|---|---|---|---|
| 6 ft 2 1/8 in (1.88 m) | 211 lb (96 kg) | 30 3/4 in (0.78 m) | 8 5/8 in (0.22 m) | 6 ft 1 3/4 in (1.87 m) | 4.57 s | 1.63 s | 2.63 s | 4.58 s | 7.18 s | 34.5 in (0.88 m) | 9 ft 10 in (3.00 m) | 9 reps |
All values from Pro Day

After going unselected in the 2025 NFL draft, Jenkins signed with the Buffalo Bills as an undrafted free agent. He was released on August 26, 2025, then re-signed to the practice squad the following day. Jenkins was elevated to the active roster for the team's Week 2 game against the New York Jets and made his NFL debut in the game. On January 19, 2026, he signed a reserve/futures contract with Buffalo.

On August 30, 2026, Jenkins was waived by the Bills as a part of final roster cuts; he was re-signed to Buffalo's practice squad the next day.
