= Dwight Galt IV =

American football player and coach (born 1987)

Current position
- Title: Head strength and conditioning coach
- Team: Marshall
- Conference: Sun Belt

Biographical details
- Born: March 12, 1987 (age 39); Silver Spring, Maryland, U.S.
- Education: University of Maryland (2009)

Playing career
- 2005–2009: Maryland
- Position: Defensive line

Coaching career (HC unless noted)
- 2010: Maryland (Strength and Conditioning Intern)
- 2010: South Carolina (GA)
- 2011–2012: South Carolina (Asst. Strength and Conditioning Coach)
- 2013–2018: Penn State (Asst. Director of Strength and Conditioning)
- 2019–2021: Old Dominion (Director of Sports Performance)
- 2022–2024: Virginia Tech (Director of Strength and Conditioning)
- 2025–Present: Marshall (Head Strength and Conditioning coach)

Dwight B. “Deege” Galt IV (born March 12, 1987) is an American football coach and former player. He was formerly the Head Strength and conditioning coach for the Virginia Tech Hokies Football program, and is the current Head Strength and Conditioning Coach at Marshall. He played college football for Maryland from 2005 to 2009. Galt was a defensive lineman under Coach Ralph Friedgen.

== Early life ==
Galt earned his bachelor's degree in Family Science from the University of Maryland, College Park in 2009. Shortly after, Galt earned strength and conditioning credentials from the National Association of Speed and Explosion and from the Collegiate Strength and Conditioning Coaches Association. Galt is a graduate of Our Lady of Good Counsel High School (MD).

== Coaching career ==
Galt began his coaching career with Maryland as a Football strength and conditioning intern. Galt then moved to work with South Carolina before spending seven seasons with Penn State. Galt has coached in numerous bowl games, including the 2016 TaxSlayer Bowl, 2017 Rose Bowl, 2017 Fiesta Bowl, the 2019 Citrus Bowl, and the 2019 Cotton Bowl Classic. He also coached in the 2016 Big Ten Football Championship Game.

Galt has been mentored by several head coaches, including Steve Spurrier, Bill O'Brien, James Franklin, and Ricky Rahne. As a coach, Galt has worked with several high-profile players, including Stephon Gilmore, Saquon Barkley, Jadeveon Clowney, Oshane Ximines, and Mike Gesicki.
