= Jaden Keller =

American football player (born 2003)

No. 48 – New York Jets
- Position: Linebacker
- Roster status: Active

Personal information
- Born: April 17, 2003 (age 23); Bristol, Tennessee, U.S.
- Listed height: 6 ft 3 in (1.91 m)
- Listed weight: 235 lb (107 kg)

Career information
- High school: Tennessee (Bristol, Tennessee)
- College: Virginia Tech (2021–2025)
- NFL draft: 2026: undrafted

Career history
- New York Jets (2026–present)

Career NFL statistics as of Week 4, 2026
- Total tackles: 1
- Stats at Pro Football Reference

Jaden Keller (born April 17, 2003) is an American professional football linebacker for the New York Jets of the National Football League (NFL). He played college football for the Virginia Tech Hokies.

== Professional career ==
On May 11, 2026, Keller signed with the New York Jets after going unselected in the 2026 NFL draft. He was waived by the Jets as a part of final roster cuts on August 30. The following day, New York re–signed Keller to the practice squad. On September 15, Keller was released by New York. He was re–signed to the team's practice squad on September 22. On October 3, Keller was elevated to New York's active roster ahead of the team's Week 4 matchup against the Chicago Bears; in the game, he recorded two tackles. He was signed to the active roster on October 24.
