= Brent Pry =

American football player and coach (born 1970)

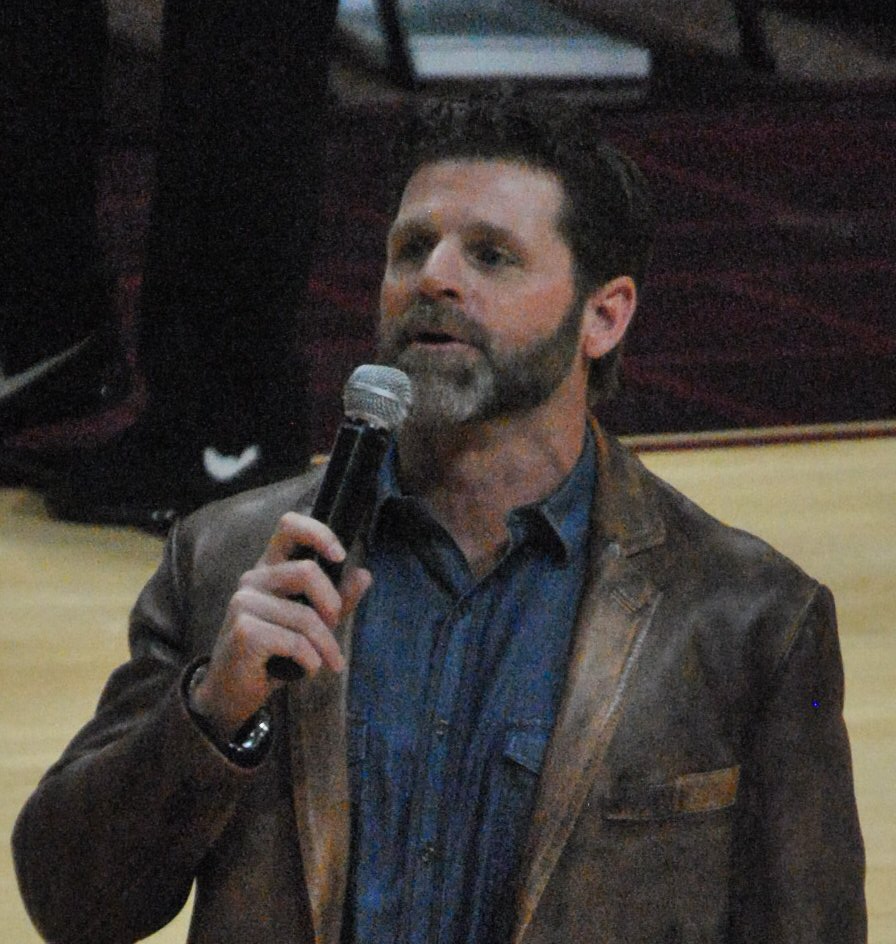
- Pry in 2021

Current position
- Title: Defensive coordinator
- Team: Virginia Tech
- Conference: ACC

Biographical details
- Born: April 1, 1970 (age 56); Altoona, Pennsylvania, U.S.

Playing career
- 1988: Maryville
- 1989–1991: Buffalo
- Position: Safety

Coaching career (HC unless noted)
- 1992: Buffalo (student coach)
- 1993–1994: East Stroudsburg (OLB/DB)
- 1995–1997: Virginia Tech (GA)
- 1998–1999: Western Carolina (DL)
- 2000–2001: Western Carolina (DB/ST)
- 2002–2006: Louisiana–Lafayette (AHC/DC/LB)
- 2007–2009: Memphis (DL)
- 2010: Georgia Southern (DC/S)
- 2011–2013: Vanderbilt (AHC/co-DC/LB)
- 2014–2015: Penn State (AHC/co-DC/LB)
- 2016–2021: Penn State (DC/LB)
- 2022–2025: Virginia Tech
- 2026–present: Virginia Tech (DC/LB)

Head coaching record
- Overall: 16–24
- Bowls: 1–1

Brenton James Pry (born April 1, 1970) is an American football coach who is the current defensive coordinator for Virginia Tech. He previously served as the head coach at Virginia Tech from 2022 until his firing during the 2025 season. Before that, he was the defensive coordinator at Penn State from 2016 to 2021. He played college football for the Buffalo Bulls.

== Early life ==
Pry was born in Altoona, Pennsylvania, the son of Altoona High graduates Jim and Kathy Pry. His father played college football at Marshall and is a long-time college coach. Pry, a 1988 graduate of Lexington High in Lexington, Virginia, was an all-region quarterback and defensive back.

== College playing career ==
Pry started his college career as a free safety at NCAA Division III Maryville College in 1988, he later transferred to then-Division III University at Buffalo where he lettered in 1990. Suffering a career-ending injury in 1991, he returned as a student coach for the 1992 season.

== Coaching career ==
=== Early coaching career ===
Pry began his coaching career in 1993 as the outside linebacker and defensive backs coach for the NCAA Division II East Stroudsburg Warriors. Pry spent two seasons with the Warriors where his father Jim served as the offensive coordinator and mentored future Penn State head coach and All-PSAC quarterback James Franklin. From 1995 to 1997 Pry served as a graduate assistant with Virginia Tech under defensive coordinator Bud Foster, where he helped the Hokies to three bowl games. Pry spent his next four seasons at FCS Western Carolina University. He coached the defensive line in 1998 and 1999, and defensive backs and special teams in 2000 and 2001. He also served as the Fellowship of Christian Athletes (FCA) liaison. Serving as the defensive coordinator at Louisiana-Lafayette from 2002 to 2006, helping the Ragin' Cajuns to their first Sun Belt Conference championship in 2005. As the defensive line coach for the Memphis Tigers from 2007 to 2009, he molded a defensive line in 2008 into one of the Conference USA's best.

=== Georgia Southern ===
While serving as defensive coordinator at Georgia Southern in 2010, Pry's Eagles finished ninth in total defense (286.93), 11th in scoring defense (18.47) and 11th in passing defense (159.93). His defensive unit helped the Eagles to a 10–5 overall record, that included a win over No. 1 Appalachian State and an appearance in the NCAA FCS semifinals. It also included a 31–15 victory over William & Mary in the second round of playoffs, that pitted Pry against future coaching mates Bob Shoop (DC) and David Corley Jr.(QBs).

=== Vanderbilt ===
On January 31, 2011, Pry was announced as the co-defensive coordinator and linebackers coach at Vanderbilt. In his first season, Pry helped coach senior linebacker Chris Marve to a place on the Second Team All-SEC squad as Vanderbilt finished the regular season 6–6. Against Tennessee, linebacker Archie Barnes returned a Tyler Bray interception 100 yards for a touchdown.

The 2012 season saw Vanderbilt finish with 9 wins, including a 7-game winning streak to end the season. Standout defensive performances included a 40–0 victory at Kentucky and 23 point victory over Tennessee. Other SEC wins in 2012 included Auburn, at Missouri, and at Ole Miss, finishing with a 5–3 record in conference and #23 national ranking. Vanderbilt won the 2012 Music City Bowl over NC State 38–24.

The 2013 team finished with another 9–4 record, including wins over #15 Georgia, at Florida, and at Tennessee. Despite a 8–4 regular season record, Vanderbilt was placed in the 2014 BBVA Compass Bowl where they defeated Houston 41–24. Once again, Vanderbilt finished the season ranked at #24.

While at Vanderbilt, Pry was instrumental in recruiting future NFL linebacker standouts Stephen Weatherly, Oren Burks, and 2016 All-American Zach Cunningham to Nashville. Pry also joined former Vanderbilt defensive coaches Bill Parcells, Perry Fewell, Phillip Fulmer, and Buddy Ryan who served as head coaches at major NCAA programs or in the NFL after spending time at Vanderbilt.

=== Penn State ===
For his efforts, Pry was a finalist for 2014 Football Scoop's Linebackers Coach of the Year. He helped Mike Hull earn the Big Ten Butkus-Fitzgerald Award, given to the conference's best linebacker and eight All-America honors in 2014. Hull's 140 tackles ranked 7th in the country, led the Big Ten Conference, and tied for fourth-most for a Nittany Lion in a single season.

After the departure of defensive coordinator Bob Shoop, Pry was promoted to associate head coach and defensive coordinator on January 10, 2016.

In 2017, the defense finished the regular season seventh in the nation and second in the Big Ten in scoring defense, averaging 15.5 points per game. Pry's defense also finished with a pair of shutout victories and only allowed more than 20 points in a game just three times. Seven times he saw his defense hold opponents scoreless in at least one half the game (Akron, Georgia State, Indiana, Northwestern, Michigan, Rutgers, Maryland). Penn State finished with an 11–2 record capped off by a Fiesta Bowl victory over the Washington Huskies. Three players were selected from the defense in the 2018 NFL draft, safety Troy Apke in the fourth round (109th overall), safety Marcus Allen in the fifth round (148th overall) and cornerback Christian Campbell was selected by the Arizona Cardinals in the sixth round (182nd overall).

In 2018, Pry's defense lead the country in sacks per game with 3.62 and finished fourth in tackles for loss with 8.2. The Penn State secondary had one of its best seasons since 2014, finishing the season with 13 interceptions and allowing a 53.6 completion rate. The Nittany Lions also held three opponents to 60 or less yards through the air, this was the first time PSU had accomplished this feat since the 1976 season. Cornerback Amani Oruwariye and defensive end Yetur Gross-Matos made the All-Big Ten first team. Six additional players, from the defense, received all-conference recognition. Defensive end Shareef Miller, cornerback Amani Oruwariye and safety Nick Scott were selected in the 2019 NFL draft.

In 2019, the Penn State defense finished the season ranked eighth nationally in scoring defense (16.0ppg), fifth nationally in rushing defense (95 ypg), first nationally in forced fumbles (22) and seventh nationally with 3.46 sacks per game (45 total). Linebacker Micah Parsons was named the Big Ten Butkus–Fitzgerald Linebacker of the Year and a consensus All-American. Parsons and Defensive End Yetur Gross-Matos received first team All-Big Ten honors. Gross-Matos was selected by the Carolina Panthers with the 38th overall pick in the second round of the 2020 NFL draft.

=== Virginia Tech ===
On November 30, 2021, Pry was named the 35th head coach at Virginia Tech, replacing Justin Fuente. In his first season with the Hokies in 2022, he recorded a 3–8 record. In his second season, he led the team to 7–6 record including a 55–17 win over rival Virginia and a win over Tulane in the Military Bowl. On September 14, 2025, Pry was fired following a 45–26 home loss to Old Dominion and an 0–3 start to the season. Philip Montgomery succeeded him as interim head coach.

On December 7, 2025, sources revealed that Pry would be returning to Virginia Tech under new head coach James Franklin. Hiring a fired head coach at the same school from the season prior is believed to be an unprecedented move in collegiate football. However, the move was not entirely unexpected due to Pry's continued support for Virginia Tech athletics and his close relation with Franklin. Weeks prior, in his introductory press conference at Virginia Tech, Franklin revealed that Pry advised him on the open position at Virginia Tech, heavily praising the school. Franklin also mentioned his close friendship with Pry, dating back 30 years.

== Head coaching record ==
Year	Team	Overall	Conference	Standing	Bowl/playoffs
Virginia Tech Hokies (Atlantic Coast Conference) (2022–2025)
2022	Virginia Tech	3–8	1–6	T–6th (Coastal)	
2023	Virginia Tech	7–6	5–3	T–4th	W Military
2024	Virginia Tech	6–7	4–4	8th	L Duke's Mayo
2025	Virginia Tech	0–3 (Note: Virginia Tech fired Pry after three games.)	0–0		
Virginia Tech:		16–24	10–13		
Total:		16–24			
