= Apke =

Apke is a surname. Notable people with the surname include:

- Steve Apke (born 1965), American football player
- Tom Apke (born 1943), American basketball coach
- Troy Apke (born 1995), American football player

== See also ==
- Åke
