= 2017 Penn State Nittany Lions football team =

American college football season

2017 Penn State Nittany Lions football

Lambert-Meadowlands Trophy Fiesta Bowl champion

Fiesta Bowl, W 35–28 vs. Washington
- Conference: Big Ten Conference
- East Division

Ranking
- Coaches: No. 8
- AP: No. 8
- Record: 11–2 (7–2 Big Ten)
- Head coach: James Franklin (4th season)
- Offensive coordinator: Joe Moorhead (2nd season; regular season); Ricky Rahne (interim; Fiesta Bowl)
- Offensive scheme: Spread
- Defensive coordinator: Brent Pry (2nd season)
- Co-defensive coordinator: Tim Banks (2nd season)
- Base defense: 4–3
- Captains: Trace McSorley; Jason Cabinda; Nick Scott; Marcus Allen; Tyler Davis; Grant Haley; DaeSean Hamilton; Saquon Barkley
- Home stadium: Beaver Stadium

2017 Big Ten Conference football standings
	Conf.			Overall
Team	W		L	W		L
East Division
No. 5 Ohio State xy$	8	–	1	12	–	2
No. 15 Michigan State	7	–	2	10	–	3
No. 8 Penn State	7	–	2	11	–	2
Michigan	5	–	4	8	–	5
Rutgers	3	–	6	4	–	8
Indiana	2	–	7	5	–	7
Maryland	2	–	7	4	–	8
West Division
No. 7 Wisconsin xy	9	–	0	13	–	1
No. 17 Northwestern	7	–	2	10	–	3
Iowa	4	–	5	8	–	5
Purdue	4	–	5	7	–	6
Nebraska	3	–	6	4	–	8
Minnesota	2	–	7	5	–	7
Illinois	0	–	9	2	–	10
Championship: Ohio State 27, Wisconsin 21
$ – Conference champion; x – Division champion/co-champions; y – Championship game participant; Rankings from AP Poll

The 2017 Penn State Nittany Lions football team represented Pennsylvania State University in the 2017 NCAA Division I FBS football season. The team was led by fourth-year head coach James Franklin and played its home games in Beaver Stadium in University Park, Pennsylvania. They were a member of the East Division of the Big Ten Conference.

Penn State entered the season as defending Big Ten champions, and were ranked sixth in the preseason AP Poll. The team won its first seven games by an average margin of victory of 30 points, including a 42–13 rout of No. 19 Michigan, and rose to second in the AP Poll. In a highly anticipated road match-up against No. 6 Ohio State, Penn State lost by a score of 38–39. The following week, the team fell again on the road to Michigan State. These would prove to be Penn State's only losses, as they finished the regular season tied for second in the East Division with a conference record of 7–2. They were invited to the 2017 Fiesta Bowl, where they defeated Washington, and finished the season at 11–2 and ranked eighth in the final polls.

The team was led on offense by running back Saquon Barkley and quarterback Trace McSorley. Barkley led the conference with 18 rushing touchdowns to go along with 1,271 rushing yards, and was named a consensus first-team All-American as an all-purpose back. McSorley's 3,571 passing yards and 284 pass completions also led the conference. On defense, safety Marcus Allen was named first-team all-conference by the coaches.

== Background ==
=== 2017 NFL draft ===
Nittany Lions who were picked in the 2017 NFL Draft or signed undrafted free agent contracts:

Round	Pick	Player	Position	Team
3	84	Chris Godwin	WR	Tampa Bay Buccaneers
UFA		Malik Golden	S	Pittsburgh Steelers
UFA		Garrett Sickels	DE	Indianapolis Colts
UFA		Brandon Bell	LB	Cincinnati Bengals
UFA		Evan Schwan	DE	New York Giants

=== Returning starters ===
==== Offense ====
Player	Class	Position
Trace McSorley 9	Junior	QB
Saquon Barkley 26	Junior	RB
DaeSean Hamilton 3	Senior	WR
Saeed Blacknall	Senior	WR
DeAndre Thompkins	Junior	WR
Mike Gesicki	Senior	TE
Ryan Bates	Sophomore	OL
Connor McGovern	Sophomore	OL
Brendan Mahon	Senior	OL

==== Defense ====
Player	Class	Position
Kevin Givens	Sophomore	DL
Jason Cabinda	Senior	LB
Manny Bowen	Junior	LB
Marcus Allen	Senior	S
Grant Haley	Senior	CB
Christian Campbell	Senior	CB

==== Special teams ====
Player	Class	Position
Tyler Davis	Senior	K/P

=== Recruits ===
Penn State's recruiting class consisted of 21 recruits, including four that enrolled early. Penn State's recruiting class was ranked No. 15 by Scout, No. 10 by Rivals, and No. 17 by ESPN.

Back	B	Center	C	Cornerback	CB	Defensive back	DB
Defensive end	DE	Defensive lineman	DL	Defensive tackle	DT	End	E
Fullback	FB	Guard	G	Halfback	HB	Kicker	K
Kickoff returner	KR	Offensive tackle	OT	Offensive lineman	OL	Linebacker	LB
Long snapper	LS	Punter	P	Punt returner	PR	Quarterback	QB
Running back	RB	Safety	S	Tight end	TE	Wide receiver	WR

College recruiting (2017)
Name	Hometown	School	Height	Weight	40^{‡}	Commit date
Damion Barber; DE	Harrisburg, PA	Harrisburg HS	6 ft 3 in (1.91 m)	253 lb (115 kg)	5.13	Feb 27, 2016
Damion Barber; DE	Recruit ratings: Scout: Rivals: 247Sports: ESPN: (79)					
Corey Bolds; DT	Paramus, NJ	Paramus Catholic HS	6 ft 3 in (1.91 m)	276 lb (125 kg)	-	Feb 1, 2017
Corey Bolds; DT	Recruit ratings: Scout: Rivals: 247Sports: ESPN: (80)					
Ellis Brooks; ILB	Richmond, VA	Benedictine HS	6 ft 2 in (1.88 m)	240 lb (110 kg)	-	Jan 30, 2017
Ellis Brooks; ILB	Recruit ratings: Scout: Rivals: 247Sports: ESPN: (81)					
D.J. Brown; CB	Fairburn, GA	Creekside HS	5 ft 11 in (1.80 m)	175 lb (79 kg)	-	Apr 24, 2016
D.J. Brown; CB	Recruit ratings: Scout: Rivals: 247Sports: ESPN: (74)					
Journey Brown; RB	Meadville, PA	Meadville HS	5 ft 11 in (1.80 m)	180 lb (82 kg)	-	Jan 11, 2017
Journey Brown; RB	Recruit ratings: Scout: Rivals: 247Sports: ESPN: (74)					
Tariq Castro-Fields; CB	Upper Marlboro, MD	Riverdale Baptist	6 ft 1 in (1.85 m)	173 lb (78 kg)	4.71	Feb 1, 2017
Tariq Castro-Fields; CB	Recruit ratings: Scout: Rivals: 247Sports: ESPN: (79)					
Sean Clifford; QB	Cincinnati, OH	Saint Xavier High School	6 ft 2 in (1.88 m)	210 lb (95 kg)	4.71	Jun 13, 2015
Sean Clifford; QB	Recruit ratings: Scout: Rivals: 247Sports: ESPN: (84)					
Brelin Faison-Walden; S	Greensboro, NC	Grimsley HS	6 ft 0 in (1.83 m)	195 lb (88 kg)	-	Jul 20, 2016
Brelin Faison-Walden; S	Recruit ratings: Scout: Rivals: 247Sports: ESPN: (78)					
Brailyn Franklin; OLB	Haymarket, VA	Battlefield HS	6 ft 2 in (1.88 m)	196 lb (89 kg)	4.89	Aug 7, 2016
Brailyn Franklin; OLB	Recruit ratings: Scout: Rivals: 247Sports: ESPN: (75)					
K. J. Hamler; WR	Bradenton, FL	IMG Academy	5 ft 9 in (1.75 m)	156 lb (71 kg)	4.43	Dec 9, 2016
K. J. Hamler; WR	Recruit ratings: Scout: Rivals: 247Sports: ESPN: (80)					
Fred Hansard; DT	Princeton, NJ	The Hun School of Princeton	6 ft 3 in (1.91 m)	305 lb (138 kg)	-	Nov 26, 2016
Fred Hansard; DT	Recruit ratings: Scout: Rivals: 247Sports: ESPN: (83)					
Mac Hippenhammer; WR	Fort Wayne, IN	R. Nelson Snider HS	6 ft 0 in (1.83 m)	170 lb (77 kg)	-	Aug 13, 2016
Mac Hippenhammer; WR	Recruit ratings: Scout: Rivals: 247Sports: ESPN: (77)					
Desmond Holmes; OT	Springfield, PA	Cardinal O'Hara HS	6 ft 6 in (1.98 m)	327 lb (148 kg)	5.56	Aug 7, 2016
Desmond Holmes; OT	Recruit ratings: Scout: Rivals: 247Sports: ESPN: (77)					
Donovan Johnson; CB	Detroit, MI	Cass Technical HS	5 ft 10 in (1.78 m)	177 lb (80 kg)	4.35	Dec 13, 2016
Donovan Johnson; CB	Recruit ratings: Scout: Rivals: 247Sports: ESPN: (76)					
Robert Martin; OT	Montvale, NJ	Saint Joseph Regional HS	6 ft 6 in (1.98 m)	270 lb (120 kg)	-	Apr 16, 2016
Robert Martin; OT	Recruit ratings: Scout: Rivals: 247Sports: ESPN: (77)					
Yetur Gross-Matos; DE	Fredericksburg, VA	Chancellor HS	6 ft 4 in (1.93 m)	290 lb (130 kg)	-	Feb 27, 2016
Yetur Gross-Matos; DE	Recruit ratings: Scout: Rivals: 247Sports: ESPN: (81)					
Michael Miranda; G	Stow, OH	Stow-Munroe Falls HS	6 ft 3 in (1.91 m)	303 lb (137 kg)	5.33	Apr 21, 2016
Michael Miranda; G	Recruit ratings: Scout: Rivals: 247Sports: ESPN: (80)					
Cameron Sullivan-Brown; WR	Laurel, MD	Saint Vincent Pallotti HS	6 ft 1 in (1.85 m)	176 lb (80 kg)	-	Jul 29, 2016
Cameron Sullivan-Brown; WR	Recruit ratings: Scout: Rivals: 247Sports: ESPN: (78)					
Jonathan Sutherland; S	Alexandria, VA	Episcopal HS	6 ft 0 in (1.83 m)	188 lb (85 kg)	4.81	Jul 21, 2016
Jonathan Sutherland; S	Recruit ratings: Scout: Rivals: 247Sports: ESPN: (80)					
C.J. Thorpe; OG	Pittsburgh, PA	Central Catholic HS	6 ft 3 in (1.91 m)	318 lb (144 kg)	-	Apr 16, 2016
C.J. Thorpe; OG	Recruit ratings: Scout: Rivals: 247Sports: ESPN: (84)					
Lamont Wade; CB	Clairton, PA	Clairton HS	5 ft 10 in (1.78 m)	187 lb (85 kg)	4.53	Dec 17, 2016
Lamont Wade; CB	Recruit ratings: Scout: Rivals: 247Sports: ESPN: (82)					
Overall recruit ranking: Scout: 15 Rivals: 10 247Sports: 21 ESPN: 17
Note: In many cases, Scout, Rivals, 247Sports, On3, and ESPN may conflict in their listings of height and weight.; In these cases, the average was taken. ESPN grades are on a 100-point scale.; Sources: "2017 Team Ranking". Rivals.com.

== Personnel ==
=== Roster ===
2017 Penn State Nittany Lions football team roster
Players
Coaches
Offense

Pos.	#	Name	Class
WR	1	K. J. Hamler	Fr
QB	2	Tommy Stevens	So
WR	3	DeAndre Thompkins	Jr
WR	5	DaeSean Hamilton (C)	Sr
RB	6	Andre Robinson	So
QB	7	Jake Zembiec	Fr
RB	8	Mark Allen	Jr
QB	9	Trace McSorley (C)	Jr
WR	10	Brandon Polk	So
WR	11	Irvin Charles	So
WR	12	Mac Hippenhammer	Fr
WR	13	Saeed Blacknall	Sr
QB	14	Sean Clifford	Fr
QB	15	Michael Shuster	Fr
QB	16	Billy Fessler	Jr
TE	18	Jonathan Holland	So
RB	20	Johnathan Thomas	Jr
RB	24	Miles Sanders	So
RB	26	Saquon Barkley (C)	Jr
WR	31	Christopher Welde	Jr
RB	32	Journey Brown	Fr
RB	39	Josh McPhearson	Sr
RB	40	Nick Eury	Fr
TE	41	Joe Arcangelo	So
OL	51	Alex Gellerstedt	Fr
OL	52	Ryan Bates	So
OL	59	Andrew Nelson	Sr
OL	61	C. J. Thorpe	Fr
OL	62	Michal Menet	Fr
OL	64	Zach Simpson	So
OL	65	Crae McCracken	Fr
OL	66	Connor McGovern	So
OL	68	Hunter Kelly	Fr
OL	70	Brendan Mahon	Sr
OL	71	Will Fries	Fr
OL	72	Robbie Martin	Fr
OL	73	Mike Miranda	Fr
OL	74	Steven Gonzalez	So
OL	75	Des Holmes	Fr
OL	76	Sterling Jenkins	So
OL	77	Chasz Wright	Jr
OL	79	Charlie Shuman	Jr
WR	80	Justin Weller	Fr
TE	80	Danny Dalton	Fr
WR	81	Cam Sullivan-Brown	Fr
WR	82	Tyler Shoop	So
TE	83	Nick Bowers	So
WR	83	Alex Hoenstine	Fr
WR	84	Juwan Johnson	So
WR	85	Isaac Lutz	Fr
WR	86	Cody Hodgens	Sr
WR	87	Dae'Lun Darien	Fr
TE	88	Mike Gesicki	Sr
TE	89	Tom Pancoast	Sr
WR	89	Colton Maxwell	Fr

Defense

Pos.	#	Name	Class
CB	1	Christian Campbell	Sr
S	2	Marcus Allen (C)	Sr
CB	3	Donovan Johnson	Fr
S	4	Nick Scott (C)	Jr
CB	5	Tariq Castro-Fields	Fr
LB	6	Cam Brown	So
LB	7	Koa Farmer	Jr
LB	9	Jarvis Miller	So
CB	12	Desi Davis	Jr
LB	13	Ellis Brooks	Fr
CB	14	Zech McPhearson	Fr
CB	15	Grant Haley (C)	Sr
S	16	John Petrishen	So
S	17	Garrett Taylor	So
DE	18	Shaka Toney	Fr
DE	19	Torrence Brown	Jr
CB	20	Jabari Butler	Jr
CB	21	Amani Oruwariye	Jr
S	23	Ayron Monroe	So
CB	24	D. J. Brown	Fr
LB	25	Brelin Faison-Walden	Fr
S	26	Jonathan Sutherland	Fr
S	28	Troy Apke	Sr
CB	29	John Reid	Jr
DT	30	Kevin Givens	So
S	32	Mitchell Vallone	Sr
LB	33	Jake Cooper	Jr
DE	34	Shane Simmons	Fr
S	35	Justin Neff	Fr
LB	36	Jan Johnson	So
S	37	Drew Hartlaub	Fr
CB	38	Lamont Wade	Fr
LB	39	Frank Di Leo	So
LB	40	Jason Cabinda (C)	Sr
DT	41	Parker Cothren	Sr
DT	42	Ellison Jordan	Fr
LB	43	Manny Bowen	Jr
LB	44	Brailyn Franklin	Fr
LB	45	Joe DuMond	So
DE	46	Colin Castagna	Jr
S	47	Will Blair	Fr
LB	47	Brandon Smith	Sr
DE	48	Shareef Miller	So
DE	49	Daniel Joseph	Fr
LB	50	Max Chizmar	Fr
LB	51	Jason Vranic	Sr
DT	52	Curtis Cothran	Sr
DT	53	Fred Hansard	Fr
DT	54	Robert Windsor	So
DT	55	Antonio Shelton	Fr
DT	56	Tyrell Chavis	Sr
DT	58	Evan Presta	Fr
DE	90	Damion Barber	Fr
DT	92	Corey Bolds	Fr
DT	96	Immanuel Iyke	So
DE	97	Ryan Buchholz	So
DE	99	Yetur Gross-Matos	Fr

Special teams

Pos.	#	Name	Class
K	90	Alex Barbir	Fr
SN	91	Chris Stoll	Fr
P	92	Daniel Pasquariello	Sr
P, K	93	Blake Gillikin	So
SN	94	Joe Calcagno	Fr
K, P	95	Tyler Davis (C)	Sr
SN	96	Kyle Vasey	Jr
K, P	97	Carson Landis	Fr
SN	98	Mike Curry	Jr
SN	98	Dan Vasey	Fr
K	99	Nick DeAngelis	Jr

Head coach

- James Franklin

Coordinators/assistant coaches

- Brent Pry (defensive coordinator/associate head coach/linebackers)
- Joe Moorhead (offensive coordinator/quarterbacks)
- Charles Huff (running backs/special teams coordinator)
- Tim Banks (safeties/co-defensive coordinator)
- Josh Gattis (wide receivers/offensive recruiting coordinator)
- Matt Limegrover (offensive line)
- Ricky Rahne (tight ends/passing game coordinator)
- Terry Smith (cornerbacks/defensive recruiting coordinator)
- Sean Spencer (defensive line/run game coordinator)
- Dwight Galt (assistant athletics director for performance enhancement)
- Sean Cascarano (graduate assistant)
- Mark Dupuis (graduate assistant)
- Matt Fleischacker (graduate assistant)
- Kevin Smith (graduate assistant)

Legend

- (C) Team captain
- (S) Suspended
- (I) Ineligible
- Injured
- Redshirt

Roster

=== Coaching staff ===
Position	Name	Alma mater
Head coach	James Franklin	East Stroudsburg (1994)
Defensive coordinator/linebackers/associate head coach	Brent Pry	Buffalo (1993)
Offensive coordinator/quarterbacks	Joe Moorhead	Fordham University (1995)
Safeties/co-defensive coordinator	Tim Banks	Central Michigan University (1994)
Running backs/special teams coordinator	Charles Huff	Hampton (2005)
Tight ends/passing game coordinator	Ricky Rahne	Cornell (2002)
Wide receivers/offensive recruiting coordinator	Josh Gattis	Wake Forest (2006)
Cornerbacks/defensive Recruiting Coordinator	Terry Smith	Penn State (1991)
Offensive line	Matt Limegrover	University of Chicago (1990)
Defensive line/run game coordinator	Sean Spencer	Clarion (1995)
Strength and conditioning	Dwight Galt	Maryland (1981)
Graduate assistant	Sean Cascarano	University of Virginia (2013)
Graduate assistant	Mark Dupuis	University of Connecticut (2011)
Graduate assistant	Matt Fleischacker	Penn State (2016)
Graduate assistant	Kevin Smith	Urbana University (2014)

== Schedule ==
=== Spring game ===
Date	Time	Spring Game	Site	TV	Result	Attendance
April 22	3:00 p.m.	Blue vs. White	Beaver Stadium • University Park, PA	BTN	Blue 26–0	73,000

=== Season ===
During the 2017 Nittany Lions season, Penn State met with non-conference opponents Akron, Pittsburgh and Georgia State (first ever meeting) and faced Big Ten conference opponents Iowa, Indiana, Northwestern, Michigan, Ohio State, Michigan State, Nebraska, Rutgers and Maryland. They also received an invitation to participate in the Fiesta Bowl against Washington. The 2017 schedule consisted of 7 home, 5 away, and 1 neutral-site games.

Penn State started the season 7–0, which included a stunning buzzer-beater victory at Iowa, and a home blowout over No. 19 Michigan. The team's first loss was at No. 6 Ohio State, where a furious comeback rally was not enough to suppress the Buckeyes. The next week, Penn State was upset at No. 24 Michigan State on a game-winning field goal. Penn State bounced back, however, with a 4-game winning streak, including a Fiesta Bowl win over No. 11 Washington.

Date	Time	Opponent	Rank	Site	TV	Result	Attendance
September 2	12:00 p.m.	Akron*	No. 6	Beaver Stadium; University Park, PA	ABC	W 52–0	101,684
September 9	3:30 p.m.	Pittsburgh*	No. 4	Beaver Stadium; University Park, PA (rivalry)	ABC	W 33–14	109,898
September 16	7:30 p.m.	Georgia State*	No. 5	Beaver Stadium; University Park, PA	BTN	W 56–0	102,746
September 23	7:30 p.m.	at Iowa	No. 4	Kinnick Stadium; Iowa City, IA	ABC	W 21–19	66,205
September 30	3:30 p.m.	Indiana	No. 4	Beaver Stadium; University Park, PA	BTN	W 45–14	107,542
October 7	12:00 p.m.	at Northwestern	No. 4	Ryan Field; Evanston, IL	ABC	W 31–7	41,061
October 21	7:30 p.m.	No. 19 Michigan	No. 2	Beaver Stadium; University Park, PA (rivalry, College GameDay)	ABC	W 42–13	110,823
October 28	3:30 p.m.	at No. 6 Ohio State	No. 2	Ohio Stadium; Columbus, OH (rivalry, College GameDay)	FOX	L 38–39	109,302
November 4	12:00 p.m.	at No. 24 Michigan State	No. 7	Spartan Stadium; East Lansing, MI (rivalry)	FOX	L 24–27	71,605
November 11	12:00 p.m.	Rutgers^{†}	No. 14	Beaver Stadium; University Park, PA	BTN	W 35–6	107,531
November 18	4:00 p.m.	Nebraska	No. 10	Beaver Stadium; University Park, PA	FS1	W 56–44	106,722
November 25	3:30 p.m.	at Maryland	No. 10	Maryland Stadium; College Park, MD (rivalry)	BTN	W 66–3	49,680
December 30	4:00 p.m.	vs. No. 11 Washington*	No. 9	University of Phoenix Stadium; Glendale, AZ (Fiesta Bowl)	ESPN	W 35–28	61,842
*Non-conference game; ^{†}Homecoming; Rankings from AP Poll and CFP Rankings after October 31 released prior to game; All times are in Eastern time

== Rankings ==
Ranking movements Legend: ██ Increase in ranking ██ Decrease in ranking
	Week															
Poll	Pre	1	2	3	4	5	6	7	8	9	10	11	12	13	14	Final
AP	6	4	5	4	4	4	3	2	2	7	16	13	12	9	9	8
Coaches	6	4	5	4	4	4	3	2	2	7	13	11	11	10	9	8
CFP	Not released									7	14	10	10	9	9	Not released

== Game summaries ==
=== Akron ===
Akron vs. Penn State – Game summary

Quarter	1	2	3	4	Total
Akron	0	0	0	0	0
#6 Penn State	14	21	10	7	52

at Beaver Stadium

- Date: September 2
- Game time: 12:00 p.m. EDT
- Game weather: 53 °F (12 °C); cool, showers
- Game attendance: 101,684
- Referee: Greg Blum
- TV announcers (ABC): Mark Jones, Rod Gilmore, Quint Kessenich
- ESPN Box Score GoPSUsports.com

Game information

First quarter

- PSU – DeAndre Thompkins, 61-yard punt return for TD, Tyler Davis kick good, 8:13 (PSU 7–0)
- PSU – Mike Gesicki, 13-yard TD pass from Trace McSorley, Davis kick good, 0:49 (PSU 14–0)

Second quarter

- PSU – McSorley, 4-yard TD run, Davis kick good, 8:48 (PSU 21–0)
- PSU – Saquon Barkley, 3-yard TD run, Davis kick good, 4:49 (PSU 28–0)
- PSU – Barkley, 30-yard TD run, Davis kick good, 0:23 (PSU 35–0)

Third quarter

- PSU – Davis, 47-yard field goal, 6:01 (PSU 38–0)
- PSU – Gesicki, 2-yard TD pass from McSorley, Davis kick good, 1:02 (PSU 45–0)

Fourth quarter

- PSU – Tommy Stevens, 5-yard TD run, Davis kick good, 10:20 (PSU 52–0)

Top passers

- UA – Thomas Woodson – 12/23, 71 yards, INT
- PSU – Trace McSorley – 18/25, 280 yards, 2 TD, INT

Top rushers

- UA – Kato Nelson – 9 carries, 39 yards
- PSU – Saquon Barkley – 14 carries, 172 yards, 2 TD

Top receivers

- UA – Tra'Von Chapman – 3 receptions, 10 yards
- UA – A.J. Coney – 2 receptions, 25 yards
- PSU – Mike Gesicki – 6 receptions, 58 yards, 2 TD

Top defenders

- UA – Zach Guiser – 10 tackles, 1 tackle-for loss (TFL), 1 INT
- PSU – Tyrell Chavis – 5 tackles, 3 tackles-for-loss (TFL), 0.5 sacks

=== Pittsburgh ===
Pittsburgh vs. Penn State – Game summary

Quarter	1	2	3	4	Total
Pittsburgh	0	3	3	8	14
#4 Penn State	14	0	7	12	33

at Beaver Stadium

- Date: September 9
- Game time: 3:30 p.m. EDT
- Game weather: 64 °F (18 °C); sunny
- Game attendance: 109,898
- Referee: Jerry Magallanes
- TV announcers (ABC): Joe Tessitore, Todd Blackledge, Holly Rowe
- ESPN Box Score GoPSUsports.com

Game information

First quarter

- PSU – Mike Gesicki, 8-yard TD pass from Trace McSorley, Tyler Davis kick good, 12:53 (PSU 7–0)
- PSU – Gesicki, 10-yard TD pass from McSorley, Davis kick good, 5:20 (PSU 14–0)

Second quarter

- UP – Alex Kessman, 28-yard field goal, 1:12 (PSU 14–3)

Third quarter

- PSU – Saquon Barkley, 46-yard TD pass from McSorley, Davis kick good, 10:32 (PSU 21–3)
- UP – Kessman, 24-yard field goal, 6:03 (PSU 21–6)

Fourth quarter

- PSU – Barkley, 8-yard TD run, Davis kick good, 14:54 (PSU 28–6)
- UP – Ben Dinucci, 3-yard TD run, Dinucci pass to Qadree Ollison for 2-point conversion, 10:09 (PSU 28–14)
- PSU – Safety: Darrin Hall tackled by Marcus Allen in the end zone, 5:53 (PSU 30–14)
- PSU – Davis, 24-yard field goal, 3:34 (PSU 33–14)

Top passers

- UP – Max Browne – 19/32, 138 yards, 2 INT
- PSU – Trace McSorley – 15/28, 164 yards, INT

Top rushers

- UP – Qadree Ollison – 15 carries, 96 yards
- PSU –Saquon Barkley – 14 carries, 88 yards, TD

Top receivers

- UP – Jester Weah – 6 receptions, 65 yards
- PSU – Saquon Barkley – 4 receptions, 45 yards, TD
- PSU – Mike Gesicki – 4 receptions, 39 yards, 2 TD

Top defenders

- UP – Oluwaseun Idowu – 7 tackles, 3 tackles-for-loss (TFL)
- PSU – Marcus Allen – 12 tackles, 1 tackle-for-loss (TFL)

=== Georgia State ===
Georgia State vs. Penn State – Game summary

Quarter	1	2	3	4	Total
Georgia State	0	0	0	0	0
#5 Penn State	14	21	14	7	56

at Beaver Stadium

- Date: September 16
- Game time: 7:30 p.m. EDT
- Game weather: 71 °F (22 °C); clear and pleasant
- Game attendance: 102,746
- Referee: Don Willard
- TV announcers (BTN): Brandon Gaudin, Glen Mason, Elise Menaker
- ESPN Box Score GoPSUsports.com

Game information

First quarter

- PSU – Tommy Stevens, 10-yard TD pass from Trace McSorley, Tyler Davis kick good, 11:48 (PSU 7–0)
- PSU – Saquon Barkley, 85-yard TD pass from McSorley, Davis kick good, 0:49 (PSU 14–0)

Second quarter

- PSU – DaeSean Hamilton, 27-yard TD pass from McSorley, Davis kick good, 11:44 (PSU 21–0)
- PSU – Miles Sanders, 29-yard TD run, Davis kick good, 8:55 (PSU 28–0)
- PSU – McSorley, 8-yard TD run, Davis kick good, 3:26 (PSU 35–0)

Third quarter

- PSU – Brandon Polk, 15-yard TD pass from McSorley, Davis kick good, 7:56 (PSU 42–0)
- PSU – Saeed Blacknall, 35-yard TD pass from Stevens, Davis kick good, 6:01 (PSU 49–0)

Fourth quarter

- PSU – Andre Robinson, 41-yard TD run, Davis kick good, 8:55 (PSU 56–0)

Top passers

- GSU – Conner Manning – 16/29, 133 yards, 3 INT
- PSU – Trace McSorley – 18/23, 309 yards, 4 TD

Top rushers

- GSU – Taz Bateman – 29 carries, 100 yards
- PSU – Saquon Barkley – 10 carries, 47 yards

Top receivers

- GSU – Penny Hart – 7 receptions, 56 yards
- PSU – Saquon Barkley – 4 receptions, 142 yards, TD

Top defenders

- GSU – Jerome Smith – 6 tackles
- GSU – Bryan Williams – 6 tackles
- PSU – Manny Bowen – 6 tackles, 0.5 tackles-for-loss (TFL), 0.5 sacks

=== at Iowa ===
Penn Stats vs. Iowa – Game summary

Quarter	1	2	3	4	Total
#4 Penn State	3	2	10	6	21
Iowa	0	7	0	12	19

at Kinnick Stadium

- Date: September 23
- Game time: 7:30 p.m. EDT
- Game weather: 91 °F (33 °C); clear
- Game attendance: 66,205
- Referee: John O'Neill
- TV announcers (ABC): Chris Fowler, Kirk Herbstreit, Maria Taylor
- ESPN Box Score GoPSUsports.com

Game information

First quarter

- PSU – Tyler Davis, 19-yard field goal, 1:01 (PSU 3–0)

Second quarter

- PSU – Safety: Akrum Wadley tackled by Shareef Miller in the end zone, 7:40 (PSU 5–0)
- UI – Nick Easley, 21-yard TD pass from Nate Stanley, Miguel Recinos kick good, 0:37 (UI 7–5)

Third quarter

- PSU – Davis, 21-yard field goal, 10:42 (PSU 8–7)
- PSU – Saquon Barkley, 8-yard TD run, David kick good, 5:16 (PSU 15–7)

Fourth quarter

- UI – Wadley, 70-yard TD pass from Stanley, 2-point conversion pass incomplete, 10:02 (PSU 15–13)
- UI – Wadley, 35-yard TD run, 2-point conversion pass incomplete, 1:42 (UI 19–15)
- PSU – Juwan Johnson, 7-yard TD pass from Trace McSorley, kick not attempted, 0:00 (PSU 21–19)

Top passers

- PSU – Trace McSorley – 31/48, 284 yards, INT, TD
- UI – Nate Stanley – 13/22, 191 yards, INT, 2 TD

Top rushers

- PSU – Saquon Barkley – 28 carries, 211 yards, TD
- UI – Akrum Wadley – 19 carries, 80 yards, TD

Top receivers

- PSU – Saquon Barkley – 12 receptions, 94 yards
- UI – Akrum Wadley – 4 receptions, 75 yards, TD

Top defenders

- PSU – Jason Cabinda – 6 tackles, 1.5 tackles-for-loss (TFL)
- UI – Josey Jewell – 16 tackles, 3 tackles-for-loss (TFL), INT

=== Indiana ===
Indiana vs. Penn State – Game summary

Quarter	1	2	3	4	Total
Indiana	0	14	0	0	14
#4 Penn State	28	0	10	7	45

at Beaver Stadium

- Date: September 30
- Game time: 3:30 p.m. EDT
- Game weather: 55 °F (13 °C); cool, partly sunny
- Game attendance: 107,542
- Referee: Jeff Servinsky
- TV announcers (BTN): Brandon Gaudin, Glen Mason, Elise Menaker
- ESPN Box Score GoPSUsports.com

Game information

First quarter

- PSU – Saquon Barkley, 98-yard kickoff return for TD, Tyler Davis kick good, 14:46 (PSU 7–0)
- PSU – Trace McSorley, 1-yard TD run, Davis kick good, 11:41 (PSU 14–0)
- PSU – Nick Scott, 13-yard fumble return for TD, Davis kick good, 6:34 (PSU 21–0)
- PSU – DaeSean Hamilton, 8-yard TD pass from McSorley, Davis kick good, 0:41 (PSU 28–0)

Second quarter

- IU – Ricky Brookins, 2-yard TD run, Griffin Oakes kick good, 14:01 (PSU 28–7)
- IU – Simmie Cobbs, Jr., 18-yard TD pass from Peyton Ramsey, Oakes kick good, 0:44 (PSU 28–14)

Third quarter

- PSU – Davis, 45-yard field goal, 5:40 (PSU 31–14)
- PSU – Hamilton, 24-yard TD pass from McSorley, Davis kick good, 3:22 (PSU 38–14)

Fourth quarter

- PSU – Hamilton, 16-yard TD pass from Barkley, Davis kick good, 4:13 (PSU 45–14)

Top passers

- IU – Peyton Ramsey – 8/17, 78 yards, TD, INT
- PSU – Trace McSorley – 23/36, 315 yards, 2 TD, INT

Top rushers

- IU – Peyton Ramsey – 12 carries, 53 yards
- IU – Morgan Ellison – 9 carries, 53 yards
- PSU – Saquon Barkley – 20 carries, 56 yards

Top receivers

- IU – Ian Thomas – 5 receptions, 91 yards
- IU – Simmie Cobbs Jr. – 5 receptions, 44 yards, TD
- PSU – DaeSean Hamilton – 9 receptions, 122 yards, 3 TD

Top defenders

- IU – Tegray Scales – 11 tackles, 3 tackles-for-loss (TFL), 3 sacks
- PSU – Jason Cabinda – 14 tackles, 1.5 tackles-for-loss (TFL), 1 sack

=== at Northwestern ===
Penn State vs. Northwestern – Game summary

Quarter	1	2	3	4	Total
#4 Penn State	3	7	14	7	31
Northwestern	0	0	0	7	7

at Ryan Field

- Date: October 7
- Game time: 12:00 p.m. EDT
- Game weather: 75 °F (24 °C); mostly cloudy
- Game attendance: 41,061
- Referee: Michael Cannon
- TV announcers (ABC): Steve Levy, Brian Griese, Todd McShay
- ESPN Box Score GoPSUsports.com

Game information

First quarter

- PSU – Tyler Davis, 21-yard field goal, 0:13 (PSU 3–0)

Second quarter

- PSU – Tommy Stevens, 10-yard TD pass from Trace McSorley, Davis kick good, 12:04 (PSU 10–0)

Third quarter

- PSU – Saquon Barkley, 1-yard TD run, Davis kick good, 9:33 (PSU 17–0)
- PSU – Barkley, 53-yard TD run, Davis kick good, 2:13 (PSU 24–0)

Fourth quarter

- PSU – McSorley, 5-yard TD run, Davis kick good, 8:52 (PSU 31–0)
- NU – Matt Alviti, 1-yard TD run, Charlie Kuhbander kick good, 1:46 (PSU 31–7)

Top passers

- PSU – Trace McSorley – 25/34, 245 yards, TD
- NU – Clayton Thorson – 19/36, 142 yards, 2 INT

Top rushers

- PSU – Saquon Barkley – 16 carries, 75 yards, 2 TD
- NU – Justin Jackson – 16 carries, 66 yards

Top receivers

- PSU – DeAndre Thompkins – 6 receptions, 57 yards
- PSU – Juwan Johnson – 6 receptions, 43 yards
- NU – Justin Jackson – 6 receptions, 23 yards

Top defenders

- PSU – Troy Apke – 5 tackles
- NU – Godwin Igwebuike – 11 tackles, 1 tackle-for-loss (TFL)

=== #19 Michigan ===
Michigan vs. Penn State – Game summary

Quarter	1	2	3	4	Total
#19 Michigan	0	13	0	0	13
#2 Penn State	14	7	7	14	42

at Beaver Stadium

- Date: October 21
- Game time: 7:30 p.m. EDT
- Game weather: 70 °F (21 °C); clear
- Game attendance: 110,823
- Referee: Jerry McGinn
- TV announcers (ABC): Chris Fowler, Kirk Herbstreit, Maria Taylor, Tom Rinaldi
- ESPN Box Score GoPSUsports.com

Game information

First quarter

- PSU – Saquon Barkley, 69-yard TD run, Tyler Davis kick good, 14:17 (PSU 7–0)
- PSU – Barkley, 15-yard TD run, Davis kick good, 10:11 (PSU 14–0)

Second quarter

- UM – Karan Higdon, 1-yard TD run, Quinn Nordin kick failed, 12:53 (PSU 14–6)
- UM – Ty Isaac, 6-yard TD run, Nordin kick good, 1:45 (PSU 14–13)
- PSU – Trace McSorley, 3-yard TD run, Davis kick good, 0:53 (PSU 21–13)

Third quarter

- PSU – McSorley, 13-yard TD run, Davis kick good, 5:13 (PSU 28–13)

Fourth quarter

- PSU – Barkley, 42-yard TD pass from McSorley, Davis kick good, 13:11 (PSU 35–13)
- PSU – McSorley, 9-yard TD run, Davis kick good, 7:53 (PSU 42–13)

Top passers

- UM – John O'Korn – 16/28, 166 yards
- PSU – Trace McSorley – 17/26, 282 yards, 1 TD, 1 INT

Top rushers

- UM – Karan Higdon – 15 carries, 45 yards, TD
- PSU – Saquon Barkley – 15 carries, 108 yards, 2 TD

Top receivers

- UM – Grant Perry – 3 receptions, 46 yards
- PSU – DaeSean Hamilton – 6 receptions, 115 yards

Top defenders

- UM – Khaleke Hudson – 7 tackles, 1 tackle-for-loss (TFL)
- PSU – Jason Cabinda – 13 tackles, 1 tackle-for-loss (TFL), 1 sack

=== at #6 Ohio State ===
Penn State vs. Ohio State – Game summary

Quarter	1	2	3	4	Total
#2 Penn State	14	14	7	3	38
#6 Ohio State	3	14	3	19	39

at Ohio Stadium

- Date: October 28
- Game time: 3:30 p.m. EDT
- Game weather: 43 °F (6 °C); cloudy
- Game attendance: 109,302
- Referee: John O'Neill
- TV announcers (FOX): Gus Johnson, Joel Klatt, Jenny Taft
- ESPN Box Score GoPSUsports.com

Game information

First quarter

- PSU – Saquon Barkley, 97-yard kickoff return for TD, Tyler Davis kick good, 14:45 (PSU 7–0)
- PSU – DaeSean Hamilton, 13-yard TD pass from Trace McSorley, Davis kick good, 11:36 (PSU 14–0)
- OSU – Sean Nuernberger, 39-yard field goal, 4:38 (PSU 14–3)

Second quarter

- PSU – Barkley, 36-yard TD run, Davis kick good, 11:40 (PSU 21–3)
- OSU – Terry McLaurin, 14-yard TD pass from J. T. Barrett, Nuernberger kick good, 9:32 (PSU 21–10)
- PSU – McSorley, 6-yard TD run, Davis kick good, 8:06 (PSU 28–10)
- OSU – Mike Weber, 2-yard TD run, Nuernberger kick good, 4:56 (PSU 28–17)

Third quarter

- OSU – Nuernberger, 36-yard field goal, 11:37 (PSU 28–20)
- PSU – DeAndre Thompkins, 37-yard TD pass from McSorley, Davis kick good, 7:25 (PSU 35–20)

Fourth quarter

- OSU – Johnnie Dixon, 38-yard pass from Barrett, Nuernberger kick good, 11:05 (PSU 35–27)
- PSU – Davis, 24-yard field goal, 5:42 (PSU 38–27)
- OSU – Dixon, 10-yard pass from Barrett, 2-point conversion run failed, 4:20 (PSU 38–33)
- OSU – Marcus Baugh, 16-yard TD pass from Barrett, 2-point conversion run failed, 1:48 (OSU 39–38)

Top passers

- PSU – Trace McSorley – 17/29, 192 yards, 2 TD
- OSU – J. T. Barrett – 33/39, 328 yards, 4 TD

Top rushers

- PSU – Trace McSorley – 13 carries, 49 yards, TD
- PSU – Saquon Barkley – 21 carries, 44 yards, TD
- OSU – J. T. Barrett – 17 carries, 95 yards
- OSU – J. K. Dobbins – 13 carries, 88 yards

Top receivers

- PSU – Mike Gesicki – 6 receptions, 57 yards
- OSU – K. J. Hill – 12 receptions, 102 yards

Top defenders

- PSU – Marcus Allen – 10 tackles
- OSU – Jordan Fuller – 9 tackles, 1 tackle-for-loss (TFL)

=== at #24 Michigan State ===
Penn State vs. Michigan State – Game summary

Quarter	1	2	3	4	Total
#7 Penn State	14	0	10	0	24
#24 Michigan State	7	7	7	6	27

at Spartan Stadium

- Date: November 4
- Game time: 12:00 p.m. EDT
- Game weather: 41 °F (5 °C); overcast, lightning (3 hour, 23 minute delay), rain
- Game attendance: 71,605
- Referee: Don Willard
- TV announcers (FOX): Joe Davis, Brady Quinn, Bruce Feldman
- ESPN Box Score GoPSUsports.com

Game information

First quarter

- PSU – DaeSean Hamilton, 31-yard TD pass from Trace McSorley, Tyler Davis kick good, 5:40 (PSU 7–0)
- MSU – Darrell Stewart Jr., 7-yard TD pass from Brian Lewerke, Matt Coghlin kick good, 3:28 (TIE 7–7)
- PSU – Saeed Blacknall, 27-yard TD pass from McSorley, Davis kick good, 0:42 (PSU 14–7)

Second quarter

- MSU – Felton Davis III, 33-yard TD pass from Lewerke, Coghlin kick good, 3:54 (TIE 14–14)

Third quarter

- MSU – L. J. Scott, 3-yard TD run, Coghlin kick good, 7:25 (MSU 21–14)
- PSU – Davis, 26-yard field goal, 2:11 (MSU 21–17)
- PSU – DeAndre Thompkins, 70-yard TD pass from McSorley, Davis kick good, 0:00 (PSU 24–21)

Fourth quarter

- MSU – Coghlin, 32-yard field goal, 10:56 (TIE 24–24)
- MSU – Coghlin, 34-yard field goal, 0:00 (MSU 27–24)

Top passers

- PSU – Trace McSorley – 26/47, 381 yards, 3 TD, 3 INT
- MSU – Brian Lewerke – 33/56, 400 yards, 2 TD, INT

Top rushers

- PSU – Saquon Barkley – 14 carries, 63 yards
- MSU – L. J. Scott – 14 carries, 43 yards, TD

Top receivers

- PSU – Mike Gesicki – 8 receptions, 89 yards
- PSU – DaeSean Hamilton – 7 receptions, 112 yards, TD
- MSU – Felton Davis III – 12 receptions, 181 yards, TD

Top defenders

- PSU – Troy Apke – 8 tackles
- MSU – Khari Willis – 11 tackles, 1 tackle-for-loss (TFL), 1 sack

=== Rutgers ===
Rutgers vs. Penn State – Game summary

Quarter	1	2	3	4	Total
Rutgers	3	3	0	0	6
#16 Penn State	0	14	14	7	35

at Beaver Stadium

- Date: November 11
- Game time: 12:00 p.m. EST
- Game weather: 34 °F (1 °C); sunny, clear, cold
- Game attendance: 107,531
- Referee: Jerry McGinn
- TV announcers (BTN): Kevin Kugler, Matt Millen, Lisa Byington
- ESPN Box Score GoPSUsports.com

Game information

First quarter

- RU – Andrew Harte, 33-yard field goal, 12:48 (RU 3–0)

Second quarter

- RU – Harte, 25-yard field goal, 11:16 (RU 6–0)
- PSU – Trace McSorley, 20-yard TD run, Tyler Davis kick good, 9:32 (PSU 7–6)
- PSU – DaeSean Hamilton, 22-yard TD pass from McSorley, Davis kick good, 1:13 (PSU 14–6)

Third quarter

- PSU – Saquon Barkley, 1-yard TD run, Davis kick good, 6:00 (PSU 21–6)
- PSU – Barkley, 4-yard TD run, Davis kick good, 1:42 (PSU 28–6)

Fourth quarter

- PSU – Mike Gesicki, 16-yard TD pass from McSorley, Davis kick good, 6:52 (PSU 35–6)

Top passers

- RU – Giovanni Rescigno – 7/20, 43 yards
- PSU – Trace McSorley – 16/21, 214 yards, 2 TD

Top rushers

- RU – Robert Martin – 11 carries, 71 yards
- PSU – Trace McSorley – 13 carries, 44 yards, TD
- PSU – Saquon Barkley – 14 carries, 35 yards, 2 TD

Top receivers

- RU – Nakia Griffin-Stewart – 2 receptions, 19 yards
- PSU – Juwan Johnson – 5 receptions, 78 yards

Top defenders

- RU – Deonte Roberts – 9 tackles, 0.5 tackles-for-loss (TFL)
- PSU – Jason Cabinda – 11 tackles, 1 tackle-for-loss (TFL)

=== Nebraska ===
Nebraska vs. Penn State – Game summary

Quarter	1	2	3	4	Total
Nebraska	10	0	14	20	44
#13 Penn State	14	28	0	14	56

at Beaver Stadium

- Date: November 18
- Game time: 4:00 p.m. EST
- Game weather: 41 °F (5 °C); rain, chilly
- Game attendance: 106,722
- Referee: Ron Snodgrass
- TV announcers (FS1): Justin Kutcher, Mark Helfrich, Petros Papadakis
- ESPN Box Score GoPSUsports.com

Game information

First quarter

- PSU – Saquon Barkley, 65-yard TD run, Tyler Davis kick good, 14:03 (PSU 7–0)
- UN – Drew Brown, 27-yard field goal, 9:18 (PSU 7–3)
- UN – Devine Ozigbo, 1-yard TD run, Brown kick good, 6:17 (UN 10–7)
- PSU – Barkley, 1-yard TD run, Davis kick good, 2:40 (PSU 14–10)

Second quarter

- PSU – Trace McSorley, 9-yard TD run, Davis kick good, 11:53 (PSU 21–10)
- PSU – Mike Gesicki, 9-yard TD pass from McSorley, Davis kick good, 9:23 (PSU 28–10)
- PSU – Barkley, 8-yard TD run, Davis kick good, 4:36 (PSU 35–10)
- PSU – DeAndre Thompkins, 15-yard TD pass from McSorley, Davis kick good, 1:19 (PSU 42–10)

Third quarter

- UN – Mikale Wilbon, 24-yard TD run, Brown kick good, 6:40 (PSU 42–17)
- UN – De'Mornay Pierson-El, 22-yard TD pass from Tanner Lee, Brown kick good, 2:34 (PSU 42–24)

Fourth quarter

- PSU – Gesicki, 17-yard TD pass from McSorley, Davis kick good, 13:59 (PSU 49–24)
- PSU – Nick Bowers, 15-yard TD pass from Tommy Stevens, Davis kick good, 10:13 (PSU 56–24)
- UN – Stanley Morgan Jr., 8-yard TD pass from Tanner Lee, Brown kick good, 6:32 (PSU 56–31)
- UN – Wilbon, 1-yard TD run, Brown kick good, 1:20 (PSU 56–38)
- UN – Jack Stoll, 3-yard TD pass from Tanner Lee, 0:00 (PSU 56–44)

Top passers

- UN – Tanner Lee – 26/41, 399 yards, 3 TD
- PSU – Trace McSorley – 24/36, 325 yards, 3 TD

Top rushers

- UN – Mikale Wilbon – 10 carries, 53 yards, 2 TD
- PSU – Saquon Barkley – 17 carries, 158 yards, 3 TD

Top receivers

- UN – Stanley Morgan Jr. – 7 receptions, 185 yards, TD
- PSU – Saquon Barkley – 6 receptions, 66 yards
- PSU – Juwan Johnson – 5 receptions, 105 yards

Top defenders

- UN – Marcus Newby – 10 tackles
- PSU – Brandon Smith – 13 tackles

=== at Maryland ===
Penn Stats vs. Maryland – Game summary

Quarter	1	2	3	4	Total
#12 Penn State	14	17	21	14	66
Maryland	0	0	3	0	3

at Maryland Stadium

- Date: November 25
- Game time: 3:30 p.m. EST
- Game weather: 61 °F (16 °C); partly cloudy
- Game attendance: 49,680
- Referee: Michael Cannon
- TV announcers (BTN): Kevin Kugler, Matt Millen, Lisa Byington
- ESPN Box Score GoPSUsports.com

Game information

First quarter

- PSU – Tommy Stevens, 21-yard TD run, Tyler Davis kick good, 10:17 (PSU 7–0)
- PSU – Trace McSorley, 5-yard TD run, Davis kick good, 3:10 (PSU 14–0)

Second quarter

- PSU – Mike Gesicki, 2-yard TD pass from McSorley, Davis kick good, 14:52 (PSU 21–0)
- PSU – Gesicki, 9-yard TD pass from McSorley, Davis kick good, 11:33 (PSU 28–0)
- PSU – Davis, 30-yard field goal, 2:24 (PSU 31–0)

Third quarter

- PSU – Saquon Barkley, 1-yard TD run, Davis kick good, 9:18 (PSU 38–0)
- PSU – Barkley, 1-yard TD run, Davis kick good, 7:12 (PSU 45–0)
- PSU – Tom Pancoast, 4-yard TD pass from Stevens, Davis kick good, 2:37 (PSU 52–0)
- UM – Henry Darmstadter, 42-yard field goal, 1:01 (PSU 52–3)

Fourth quarter

- PSU – Stevens, 3-yard TD run, Davis kick good, 7:44 (PSU 59–3)
- PSU – Stevens, 6-yard TD run, Davis kick good, 2:24 (PSU 66–3)

Top passers

- PSU – Trace McSorley – 22/33, 237 yards, 2 TD
- UM – Max Bortenschlager – 20/36, 185 yards

Top rushers

- PSU – Tommy Stevens – 12 carries, 113 yards, 3 TD
- PSU – Saquon Barkley – 16 carries, 77 yards, 2 TD
- UM – Ty Johnson – 8 carries, 70 yards

Top receivers

- PSU – Juwan Johnson – 6 receptions, 63 yards
- UM – D. J. Moore – 8 receptions, 100 yards

Top defenders

- PSU – Brandon Smith – 5 tackles
- UM – Jermaine Carter Jr. – 11 tackles

=== #12 Washington (Fiesta Bowl) ===
Washington vs. Penn Stats – Game summary

Quarter	1	2	3	4	Total
#12 Washington	0	14	7	7	28
#9 Penn State	14	14	7	0	35

at University of Phoenix Stadium

- Date: December 30
- Game time: 4:00 p.m. EST
- Game weather: 70 °F (21 °C); indoors, roof closed
- Game attendance: 61,842
- Referee: Mike Defee
- TV announcers (ESPN): Dave Pasch, Greg McElroy, Tom Luginbill
- ESPN Box Score GoPSUsports.com

Game information

First quarter

- PSU – DaeSean Hamilton, 48-yard TD pass from Trace McSorley, Tyler Davis kick good, 11:10 (PSU 7–0)
- PSU – Saquon Barkley, 2-yard TD run, Davis kick good, 1:34 (PSU 14–0)

Second quarter

- UW – Jake Browning, 1-yard TD run, Tristan Vizcaino kick good, 14:57 (PSU 14–7)
- PSU – Miles Sanders, 1-yard TD run, Davis kick good, 11:59 (PSU 21–7)
- PSU – Barkley, 92-yard TD run, Davis kick good, 9:01 (PSU 28–7)
- UW – Myles Gaskin, 13-yard TD run, Vizcaino kick good, 4:15 (PSU 28–14)

Third quarter

- UW – Aaron Fuller, 28-yard TD pass from Browning, Vizcaino kick good, 9:57 (PSU 28–21)
- PSU – Hamilton, 24-yard TD pass from McSorley, Davis kick good, 5:59 (PSU 35–21)

Fourth quarter

- UW – Gaskin, 69-yard TD run, Vizcaino kick good, 6:52 (PSU 35–28)

Top passers

- UW – Jake Browning – 18/28, 175 yards, TD
- PSU – Trace McSorley – 32/41, 342 yards, 2 TD

Top rushers

- UW – Myles Gaskin – 14 carries, 98 yards, 2 TD
- PSU – Saquon Barkley – 18 carries, 137 yards, 2 TD

Top receivers

- UW – Aaron Fuller – 6 receptions, 61 yards, TD
- PSU – Saquon Barkley – 7 receptions, 38 yards
- PSU – DaeSean Hamilton – 5 receptions, 110 yards, 2 TD

Top defenders

- UW – Keishawn Bierria – 11 tackles
- PSU – Marcus Allen – 7 tackles

== Awards and honors ==
=== Pre-season watch lists ===
Player	Watch list	Ref.
Saquon Barkley	Maxwell Award	
Saquon Barkley	Doak Walker Award	
Trace McSorley	Maxwell Award	
Trace McSorley	Davey O'Brien Award	
Trace McSorley	Johnny Unitas Award	
Trace McSorley	Wuerffel Trophy	
Marcus Allen	Chuck Bednarik Award	
Marcus Allen	Bronco Nagurski Award	
Marcus Allen	Lott Trophy	
Marcus Allen	Jim Thorpe Award	
Jason Cabinda	Chuck Bednarik Award	
Jason Cabinda	Bronco Nagurski Award	
Mike Gesicki	John Mackey Award	
Tyler Davis	Lou Groza Award	
Blake Gillikin	Ray Guy Award	
Brandon Smith	American Football Coaches; Association Good Works team	

=== In-season ===
Weekly Awards
Player	Award	Date Awarded	Ref.
Saquon Barkley	Co-Big Ten Offensive Player of the Week	September 4, 2017	
DeAndre Thompkins	Co-Special Teams Player of the Week	September 4, 2017	
Marcus Allen	Big Ten Defensive Player of the Week	September 10, 2017	
Saquon Barkley	Big Ten Offensive Player of the Week	September 24, 2017	
DaeSean Hamilton	Big Ten Offensive Player of the Week	October 1, 2017	
Saquon Barkley	Big Ten Special Teams Player of the week	October 1, 2017	
Saquon Barkley	Big Ten Offensive Player of the Week	October 22, 2017	
Jason Cabinda	Big Ten Defensive Player of the week	October 22, 2017	
Trace McSorley	Walter Camp National Offensive Player of the Week	October 22, 2017	

== Players in the 2018 NFL draft ==
Player	Position	Round	Pick	NFL club
Saquon Barkley	RB	1	2	New York Giants
Mike Gesicki	TE	2	42	Miami Dolphins
Troy Apke	S	4	109	Washington Redskins
DaeSean Hamilton	WR	4	113	Denver Broncos
Marcus Allen	S	5	148	Pittsburgh Steelers
Christian Campbell	CB	6	182	Arizona Cardinals
