= 2017 Nebraska Cornhuskers football team =

American college football season

2017 Nebraska Cornhuskers football
- Conference: Big Ten Conference
- West Division
- Record: 4–8 (3–6 Big Ten)
- Head coach: Mike Riley (3rd season)
- Offensive coordinator: Danny Langsdorf (3rd season)
- Offensive scheme: Multiple
- Defensive coordinator: Bob Diaco (1st season)
- Base defense: 3–4
- Home stadium: Memorial Stadium

2017 Big Ten Conference football standings
	Conf.			Overall
Team	W		L	W		L
East Division
No. 5 Ohio State xy$	8	–	1	12	–	2
No. 15 Michigan State	7	–	2	10	–	3
No. 8 Penn State	7	–	2	11	–	2
Michigan	5	–	4	8	–	5
Rutgers	3	–	6	4	–	8
Indiana	2	–	7	5	–	7
Maryland	2	–	7	4	–	8
West Division
No. 7 Wisconsin xy	9	–	0	13	–	1
No. 17 Northwestern	7	–	2	10	–	3
Iowa	4	–	5	8	–	5
Purdue	4	–	5	7	–	6
Nebraska	3	–	6	4	–	8
Minnesota	2	–	7	5	–	7
Illinois	0	–	9	2	–	10
Championship: Ohio State 27, Wisconsin 21
$ – Conference champion; x – Division champion/co-champions; y – Championship game participant; Rankings from AP Poll

The 2017 Nebraska Cornhuskers football team represented the University of Nebraska during the 2017 NCAA Division I FBS football season. The team was coached by third-year head coach Mike Riley and played their home games at Memorial Stadium in Lincoln, Nebraska. They competed as members of the West Division of the Big Ten Conference. They finished the season 4–8, 3–6 in Big Ten play to finish in fifth place in the West Division.

At the conclusion of the regular season, head coach Mike Riley was fired. On December 2, the school hired UCF head coach and Nebraska alumnus Scott Frost as head coach.

== Offseason ==
=== Transfers ===
==== Outgoing ====
Name	No.	Pos.	Height	Weight	Year	Hometown	Destination
Lavan Alston	#3	WR	6'0"	175	Sophomore	Oxnard, CA	Ventura CC
Zach Hannon	#72	OG	6'5"	320	Senior	Kansas City, MO	Kansas
Dwayne Johnson Jr.	#76	OL	6'6"	310	Senior	Houston, TX	Texas Tech
Greg Simmons	#31	LB	6'2"	240	RS Freshman	Fort Pierce, FL	Duquesne
Keyshawn Johnson Jr.	#3	WR	6'1"	195	Freshman	Los Angeles, CA	Arizona

==== Incoming ====
Name	No.	Pos.	Height	Weight	Year	Hometown	Prev. School
Kramer Rath	#95	K	6'1"	175	Senior (Grad Transfer)	Lincoln, NE	Nebraska Wesleyan

=== Coaching departures & replacements ===
Name	Pos.	Destination	Replacement
Mark Banker	Defensive Coordinator	Hawai'i (2018) (LB/Asst. HC)	Bob Diaco
Brian Stewart	Defensive Backs coach	Rice (DC)	Bob Elliott (S) and Donte Williams (CB)
Bruce Read	Special Teams Coordinator	Montreal Alouettes (STC)	Scott Booker but role largely divided up.
Bob Elliott	Safeties	Nebraska (defensive analyst)	Scott Booker

=== Other headlines ===
- February 22 – WR coach Keith Williams pleaded no contest to a criminal charge of driving under the influence (DUI), steming from his August 14, 2016 car accident and arrest. It is his third DUI conviction in 13 years but his first in Nebraska. He was sentenced to 30 days in jail, 3 years of probation, and ordered to pay a $1,000 fine, with his driver's license revoked and given the option to apply to have his jail sentence converted to house arrest. His jail sentence was converted to house arrest on March 1.
- May 26 – Junior WR Stanley Morgan Jr. and Junior DB Antonio Reed were arrested and charged in Port Orange, Florida with misdemeanor possession of marijuana, following a traffic stop. Charges against Morgan were dropped on July 17 after he successfully completed a drug treatment program.
- June 10 – Freshman early-enrollee WR Keyshawn Johnson Jr. (son of former NFL star Keyshawn Johnson) was cited for possession of marijuana in his dorm room by campus police. On June 20, Johnson reportedly had left the program on a "leave of absence" and will likely not participate with the team during the season, potentially returning in January after the season.
- July 8 – Nebraska defensive analysis and former safeties assistant coach Bob Elliott died in hospice care at age 64. Elliott had been hired as the team's safeties coach in mid-February 2017 but had stepped down from his position to an off-field analysis position on June 20 for "personal reasons." He had been diagnosed in 1998 with polycythemia vera (a rare blood cancer) and received a blood marrow transplant soon after. He had been suffering from health issues in recent years that had limited him to an off-field role for the 2015 and 2016 seasons at Notre Dame before coming to Nebraska.
- July 16 – Incoming freshmen CB Elijah Blades and DL Deiontae Watts failed to academically qualify to attend Nebraska, and joined junior colleges as a result.

== Recruiting ==
=== Position key ===
Back	B	Center	C	Cornerback	CB	Defensive back	DB
Defensive end	DE	Defensive lineman	DL	Defensive tackle	DT	End	E
Fullback	FB	Guard	G	Halfback	HB	Kicker	K
Kickoff returner	KR	Offensive tackle	OT	Offensive lineman	OL	Linebacker	LB
Long snapper	LS	Punter	P	Punt returner	PR	Quarterback	QB
Running back	RB	Safety	S	Tight end	TE	Wide receiver	WR

=== Recruits ===
As of National Signing Day (February 7, 2017), Nebraska's 2017 recruiting class consisted of 20 commits, 8 walk-ons, and 1 JUCO walk-on transfer. On, February 16, 2017, Kade Warner, son of NFL Hall of Famer Kurt Warner, joined the team as a preferred walk-on. 5 non-recruited walk-ons joined the team via tryout on March 29, 2017. One additional preferred walk-on was added in late April.

==== Scholarship recruits ====
College recruiting (2017)
Name	Hometown	School	Height	Weight	Commit date
Willie Hampton; LB	Ft. Lauderdale, FL	American Heritage HS	6 ft 1 in (1.85 m)	225 lb (102 kg)	Mar 9, 2016
Willie Hampton; LB	Recruit ratings: Scout: Rivals: 247Sports: ESPN: (77)				
Jaevon McQuitty; WR	Columbia, MO	Battle HS	6 ft 0 in (1.83 m)	191 lb (87 kg)	Mar 12, 2016
Jaevon McQuitty; WR	Recruit ratings: Scout: Rivals: 247Sports: ESPN: (80)				
Keyshawn Johnson, Jr. WR	Calabasas, CA	Calabasas HS	6 ft 1 in (1.85 m)	195 lb (88 kg)	Mar 23, 2016
Keyshawn Johnson, Jr. WR	Recruit ratings: Scout: Rivals: 247Sports: ESPN: (80)				
Tristan Gebbia; QB	Calabasas, CA	Calabasas HS	6 ft 3 in (1.91 m)	180 lb (82 kg)	Apr 4, 2016
Tristan Gebbia; QB	Recruit ratings: Scout: Rivals: 247Sports: ESPN: (82)				
Austin Allen; TE	Aurora, NE	Aurora	6 ft 8 in (2.03 m)	210 lb (95 kg)	Apr 14, 2016
Austin Allen; TE	Recruit ratings: Scout: Rivals: 247Sports: ESPN: (75)				
Brenden Jaimes; OT	Austin, TX	Lake Travis HS	6 ft 5 in (1.96 m)	250 lb (110 kg)	Apr 16, 2016
Brenden Jaimes; OT	Recruit ratings: Scout: Rivals: 247Sports: ESPN: (79)				
Avery Roberts; LB	Wilmington, DE	Concord HS	6 ft 1 in (1.85 m)	220 lb (100 kg)	Apr 21, 2016
Avery Roberts; LB	Recruit ratings: Scout: Rivals: 247Sports: ESPN: (80)				
Deontre Thomas; DT	Mustang, OK	Mustang HS	6 ft 3 in (1.91 m)	280 lb (130 kg)	Apr 30, 2016
Deontre Thomas; DT	Recruit ratings: Scout: Rivals: 247Sports: ESPN: (80)				
Matt Sichterman; OT	Kings Mills, OH	Kings HS	6 ft 5 in (1.96 m)	266 lb (121 kg)	May 15, 2016
Matt Sichterman; OT	Recruit ratings: Scout: Rivals: 247Sports: ESPN: (80)				
Broc Bando; OG	Lincoln, NE	IMG Academy	6 ft 4 in (1.93 m)	280 lb (130 kg)	Jun 17, 2016
Broc Bando; OG	Recruit ratings: Scout: Rivals: 247Sports: ESPN: (77)				
Ben Miles; FB	Baton Rouge, LA	Catholic HS	6 ft 1 in (1.85 m)	210 lb (95 kg)	Jul 31, 2016
Ben Miles; FB	Recruit ratings: Scout: Rivals: 247Sports: ESPN: (79)				
Guy Thomas; DE	Miami, FL	Booker T. Washington HS	6 ft 3 in (1.91 m)	202 lb (92 kg)	Aug 8, 2016
Guy Thomas; DE	Recruit ratings: Scout: Rivals: 247Sports: ESPN: (80)				
Deiontae Watts; DT	Plano, TX	Plano East HS	6 ft 3 in (1.91 m)	302 lb (137 kg)	Sep 18, 2016
Deiontae Watts; DT	Recruit ratings: Scout: Rivals: 247Sports: ESPN: (79)				
Andrew Ward; LB	Muskegon, MI	Muskegon HS	6 ft 1 in (1.85 m)	200 lb (91 kg)	Dec 25, 2016
Andrew Ward; LB	Recruit ratings: Scout: Rivals: 247Sports: ESPN: (75)				
Jaylin Bradley; RB	Bellevue, NE	Bellevue West HS	6 ft 0 in (1.83 m)	180 lb (82 kg)	Jan 5, 2017
Jaylin Bradley; RB	Recruit ratings: Scout: Rivals: 247Sports: ESPN: (73)				
Tyjon Lindsey; WR	Las Vegas, NV	Bishop Gorman HS	5 ft 9 in (1.75 m)	161 lb (73 kg)	Jan 14, 2017
Tyjon Lindsey; WR	Recruit ratings: Scout: Rivals: 247Sports: ESPN: (84)				
Chris Walker; OT	Lincoln, NE	Lincoln East HS	6 ft 6 in (1.98 m)	275 lb (125 kg)	Jan 16, 2017
Chris Walker; OT	Recruit ratings: Scout: Rivals: 247Sports: ESPN: (74)				
Kurt Rafdal; TE	Carmel, IN	Carmel HS	6 ft 7 in (2.01 m)	230 lb (100 kg)	Jan 29, 2017
Kurt Rafdal; TE	Recruit ratings: Scout: Rivals: 247Sports: ESPN: (78)				
Elijah Blades; CB	Pasadena, CA	John Muir HS	6 ft 2 in (1.88 m)	170 lb (77 kg)	Feb 1, 2017
Elijah Blades; CB	Recruit ratings: Scout: Rivals: 247Sports: ESPN: (81)				
Damion Daniels; DT	Dallas, TX	Bishop Dunne HS	6 ft 1 in (1.85 m)	315 lb (143 kg)	Feb 1, 2017
Damion Daniels; DT	Recruit ratings: Scout: Rivals: 247Sports: ESPN: (80)				
Overall recruit ranking: Scout: 18 Rivals: 20 247Sports: 23 ESPN: 21
Note: In many cases, Scout, Rivals, 247Sports, On3, and ESPN may conflict in their listings of height and weight.; In these cases, the average was taken. ESPN grades are on a 100-point scale.; Sources: "Nebraska Football Commitments". Rivals.; "2017 Nebraska Football Commits". Scout.; "ESPN". ESPN.; "Scout.com Team Recruiting Rankings". Scout.; "2017 Team Ranking". Rivals.com.

==== Walk-on recruits ====
College recruiting (2017)
Name	Hometown	School	Height	Weight	Commit date
Banker, Christian; WR	Omaha, NE	Skutt HS	6 ft 1 in (1.85 m)	185 lb (84 kg)	Apr 28, 2017
Banker, Christian; WR	Recruit ratings: Scout: Rivals: 247Sports: ESPN:				
Bunch, Andrew; QB (Soph.)	Thompson's Station, TN	Independence (TN) HS; Scottsdale (AZ) CC	6 ft 1 in (1.85 m)	182 lb (83 kg)	Jan 19, 2017
Bunch, Andrew; QB (Soph.)	Recruit ratings: Scout: Rivals: 247Sports: ESPN:				
Cox, Ethan; WR	Blair, NE	Blair HS	5 ft 11 in (1.80 m)	175 lb (79 kg)	Nov 28, 2016
Cox, Ethan; WR	Recruit ratings: Scout: Rivals: 247Sports: ESPN:				
Frahm, Cole; K	Omaha, NE	Omaha Burke HS	6 ft 4 in (1.93 m)	205 lb (93 kg)	Dec 21, 2016
Frahm, Cole; K	Recruit ratings: Scout: Rivals: 247Sports: ESPN:				
Hixson, Trent; OG/DT	Omaha, NE	Skutt HS	6 ft 3 in (1.91 m)	275 lb (125 kg)	Dec 15, 2016
Hixson, Trent; OG/DT	Recruit ratings: Scout: Rivals: 247Sports: ESPN:				
Lingenfelter, Ben; OG	Cherokee, IA	Washington (Cherokee, IA) HS	6 ft 5 in (1.96 m)	270 lb (120 kg)	Dec 12, 2016
Lingenfelter, Ben; OG	Recruit ratings: Scout: Rivals: 247Sports: ESPN:				
Liske, Cody; LB	Bennington, NE	Bennington HS	6 ft 0 in (1.83 m)	200 lb (91 kg)	Nov 27, 2016
Liske, Cody; LB	Recruit ratings: Scout: Rivals: 247Sports: ESPN:				
Miller, Hunter; OG	Stromsburg, NE	Cross Country (NE) HS	6 ft 5 in (1.96 m)	275 lb (125 kg)	Dec 16, 2016
Miller, Hunter; OG	Recruit ratings: Scout: Rivals: 247Sports: ESPN:				
Paup, Jordan; DE	Central City, NE	Central City HS	6 ft 3 in (1.91 m)	230 lb (100 kg)	Feb 1, 2017
Paup, Jordan; DE	Recruit ratings: Scout: Rivals: 247Sports: ESPN:				
Reynolds, Dylan; ATH	Broken Bow, NE	Broken Bow HS	6 ft 0 in (1.83 m)	170 lb (77 kg)	Nov 26, 2016
Reynolds, Dylan; ATH	Recruit ratings: Scout: Rivals: 247Sports: ESPN:				
Warner, Kade; WR	Scottsdale, AZ	Desert Mountain HS	6 ft 2 in (1.88 m)	205 lb (93 kg)	Feb 16, 2017
Warner, Kade; WR	Recruit ratings: Scout: Rivals: 247Sports: ESPN: (68)				
Overall recruit ranking:
Note: In many cases, Scout, Rivals, 247Sports, On3, and ESPN may conflict in their listings of height and weight.; In these cases, the average was taken. ESPN grades are on a 100-point scale.; Sources: "2017 Team Ranking". Rivals.com.

==== Tryout walk-ons ====
College recruiting (2017)
Name	Hometown	School	Height	Weight	Commit date
Jackson, Damian; LB	Las Vegas, NV	Shadow Ridge HS; US Navy SEALs	6 ft 1 in (1.85 m)	245 lb (111 kg)	Mar 29, 2017
Jackson, Damian; LB	Recruit ratings: Scout: Rivals: 247Sports: ESPN:				
Marquez, Jose; DB	Crete, NE	Crete HS	5 ft 10 in (1.78 m)	195 lb (88 kg)	Mar 29, 2017
Marquez, Jose; DB	Recruit ratings: Scout: Rivals: 247Sports: ESPN:				
Robbins, Brandon; WR	Bellevue, NE	Bellevue East HS	5 ft 10 in (1.78 m)	190 lb (86 kg)	Mar 29, 2017
Robbins, Brandon; WR	Recruit ratings: Scout: Rivals: 247Sports: ESPN:				
Walker, Jackson; P (Junior)	Overland Park, KS	Blue Valley Northwest HS; Johnson County CC; Coffeyville CC	6 ft 4 in (1.93 m)	250 lb (110 kg)	Mar 29, 2017
Walker, Jackson; P (Junior)	Recruit ratings: Scout: Rivals: 247Sports: ESPN:				
Zimmerman, Derek; WR/P (Junior)	Adams/Filley, NE	Freeman HS; Arkansas (Track & Field)	N/A	N/A	Mar 29, 2017
Zimmerman, Derek; WR/P (Junior)	Recruit ratings: Scout: Rivals: 247Sports: ESPN:				
Chad Alioth Jr. WR	Omaha, NE	Omaha North HS	6 ft 2 in (1.88 m)	180 lb (82 kg)	Aug 28, 2017
Chad Alioth Jr. WR	Recruit ratings: Scout: Rivals: 247Sports: ESPN:				
Johnny Richard; WR	Austell, GA	South Cobb HS	6 ft 5 in (1.96 m)	203 lb (92 kg)	Aug 28, 2017
Johnny Richard; WR	Recruit ratings: Scout: Rivals: 247Sports: ESPN:				
Bradley Bunner; DB	Clarkson, NE	Clarkson-Leigh HS	6 ft 1 in (1.85 m)	180 lb (82 kg)	Aug 31, 2017
Bradley Bunner; DB	Recruit ratings: Scout: Rivals: 247Sports: ESPN:				
Overall recruit ranking:
Note: In many cases, Scout, Rivals, 247Sports, On3, and ESPN may conflict in their listings of height and weight.; In these cases, the average was taken. ESPN grades are on a 100-point scale.; Sources: "2017 Team Ranking". Rivals.com.

=== Returning starters ===
==== Offense ====
Player	Class	Position
Cole Conrad	Junior	Offensive tackle
Tanner Farmer	Junior	Offensive guard
Jerald Foster	Junior	Offensive guard
Nick Gates	Junior	Offensive tackle
Devine Ozigbo	Junior	Running back
De'Mornay Pierson-El	Senior	Wide receiver
Luke McNitt	Senior	Fullback
Stanley Morgan Jr.	Junior	Wide receiver
David Knevel	Senior	Offensive tackle
Bryan Reimers	Junior	Wide receiver

==== Defense ====
Player	Class	Position
Freedom Akinmoladun	Junior	Defensive end
Carlos Davis	Sophomore	Defensive tackle
Tyrin Ferguson	Junior	Linebacker
Luke Gifford	Junior	Linebacker
Chris Jones	Senior	Cornerback
Boaz Joseph	Senior	Cornerback
Joshua Kalu	Senior	Cornerback
Marcus Newby	Senior	Linebacker
Antonio Reed	Junior	Free safety
Mick Stoltenberg	Junior	Defensive tackle
Aaron Williams	Junior	Strong safety
Kieron Williams	Senior	Free safety
Chris Weber	Senior	Linebacker
Dedrick Young	Junior	Linebacker

==== Special teams ====
Player	Class	Position
Drew Brown	Senior	Kicker
Tre Bryant	Sophomore	Kick returner
Zack Darlington	Junior	Holder
Caleb Lightbourn	Sophomore	Punter
Jordan Ober	Junior	Long Snapper
De'Mornay Pierson-El	Senior	Punt returner

== Schedule ==
Date	Time	Opponent	Site	TV	Result	Attendance	Source
September 2	7:00 p.m.	Arkansas State*	Memorial Stadium; Lincoln, NE	BTN	W 43–36	90,171	
September 9	3:30 p.m.	at Oregon*	Autzen Stadium; Eugene, OR	FOX	L 35–42	58,389	
September 16	11:00 a.m.	Northern Illinois*	Memorial Stadium; Lincoln, NE	FS1	L 17–21	89,664	
September 23	2:30 p.m.	Rutgers^{†}	Memorial Stadium; Lincoln, NE	BTN	W 27–17	89,775	
September 29	7:00 p.m.	at Illinois	Memorial Stadium; Champaign, IL	FS1	W 28–6	43,058	
October 7	7:00 p.m.	No. 9 Wisconsin	Memorial Stadium; Lincoln, NE (Freedom Trophy)	BTN	L 17–38	89,860	
October 14	6:30 p.m.	No. 9 Ohio State	Memorial Stadium; Lincoln, NE	FS1	L 14–56	89,346	
October 28	6:30 p.m.	at Purdue	Ross–Ade Stadium; West Lafayette, IN	BTN	W 25–24	41,411	
November 4	2:30 p.m.	Northwestern	Memorial Stadium; Lincoln, NE	BTN	L 24–31 ^{OT}	89,721	
November 11	11:00 a.m.	at Minnesota	TCF Bank Stadium; Minneapolis, MN ($5 Bits of Broken Chair Trophy)	FS1	L 21–54	39,933	
November 18	3:00 p.m.	at No. 13 Penn State	Beaver Stadium; University Park, PA	FS1	L 44–56	106,722	
November 24	3:00 p.m.	Iowa	Memorial Stadium; Lincoln, NE (Heroes Game)	FS1	L 14–56	90,046	
*Non-conference game; ^{†}Homecoming; Rankings from AP Poll released prior to game; All times are in Central time; Source:

== Roster and coaching staff ==
2017 Nebraska Cornhuskers football team roster
Players
Coaches
Offense

Pos.	#	Name	Class
WR	42	Chad Alioth Jr.	Fr
TE	11	Austin Allen	Fr
OL	73	Broc Bando	Fr
WR	36	Christian Banker	Fr
OL	74	Jalin Barnett	So
RB	33	Jaylin Bradley	Fr
OL	61	Bryan Brokop	RFr
IB	18	Tre Bryant (injured)	So
QB	16	Andrew Bunch	So
WR	45	Ty Chaffin	RFr
WR	80	Brett Classen	Sr
OL	62	Cole Conrad	Jr
WR	2	Zack Darlington	Jr
OL	79	Michael Decker	So
TE	84	David Engelhaupt	RFr
OL	63	Tanner Farmer	Jr
OL	71	Matt Farniok	RFr
OL	67	Jerald Foster (C)	Jr
OL	68	Nick Gates	Jr
OL	65	Christian Gaylord	So
QB	14	Tristan Gebbia	Fr
RB	32	Tanner Hass	RFr
FB	49	Austin Hemphill	So
OL	75	Trent Hixson	Fr
TE	47	Branden Hohenstein	RFr
WR	43	Todd Honas	RFr
TE	88	Tyler Hoppes	Sr
OL	76	Brenden Jaimes	Fr
WR	3	Keyshawn Johnson Jr	Fr
FB	38	Harrison Jordan	Sr
TE	89	Connor Ketter	Sr
TE	30	Bo Kitrell	Jr
OL	59	Jake Kitten	RFr
OL	77	David Knevel	Sr
RB	24	Sean Lambert	RFr
QB	13	Tanner Lee (C)	Jr
WR	1	Tyjon Lindsey	Fr
IB	37	Wyatt Mazour	So
FB	41	Luke McNitt (C)	Sr
WR	4	Jaevon McQuitty	Fr
FB	29	Ben Miles	Fr
OL	66	Hunter Miller	Fr
WR	8	Stanley Morgan Jr.	Jr
QB	12	Patrick O'Brien	RFr
IB	22	Devine Ozigbo	Jr
WR	15	De'Mornay Pierson-El	Sr
TE	82	Kurt Rafdal	Fr
WR	81	Gabe Rahn	Sr
OL	50	John Raridon	RFr
WR	83	Bryan Reimers	Jr
WR	33	Dylan Reynolds	Fr
WR	48	Johnny Richards	Fr
WR	40	Brandon Robbins	Fr
FB	23	Austin Rose	Jr
OL	70	Matt Sichterman	Fr
TE	85	Matt Snyder	So
WR	10	JD Spielman	RFr
TE	86	Jack Stoll	RFr
IB	28	Adam Taylor	Sr
OL	55	Chris Walker	Fr
WR	31	Kade Warner	Fr
OL	51	Matt Watts	Sr
IB	21	Mikale Wilbon	Jr
WR	9	Keyan Williams	Jr
OL	56	Boe Wilson	RFr
WR	87	Conor Young	So

Defense

Pos.	#	Name	Class
DL	91	Freedom Akinmoladun	Jr
OLB	30	Quayshon Alexander	RFr
CB	4	Avery Anderson	So
DL	75	Fyn Anderson	So
ILB	7	Mohamed Barry	So
CB	23	Dicaprio Bootle	RFr
DB	39	Bradely Bunner	Fr
DB	2	Tony Butler	RFr
LB	26	Thomas Connely	Jr
DB	16	Ethan Cox	Fr
DL	93	Damion Daniels	Fr
OLB	22	Alex Davis	So
DL	96	Carlos Davis	So
DL	94	Khalil Davis	So
S	19	Marquel Dismuke	RFr
S	13	JoJo Domann (injured)	So
DL	48	Erik Evans	Sr
OLB	43	Tyrin Ferguson	So
OLB	12	Luke Gifford	Jr
LB	33	Willie Hampton	Fr
LB	38	Damian Jackson	Fr
CB	21	Lamar Jackson	So
DL	47	Matt Jarzynka	Jr
OLB	32	Pernell Jefferson	RFr
CB	8	Chris Jones	Sr
LB	40	Grant Jordan	RFr
LB	36	Spencer Jordan	RFr
CB	11	Boaz Joseph	Sr
S	46	Joshua Kalu (C)	Sr
DB	36	Reid Karel	So
OLB	17	Sedrick King	Jr
CB	6	Eric Lee Jr.	So
DL	90	Ben Lingenfelter	Fr
LB	42	Cody Liske	Fr
DL	58	Joel Lopez	Sr
DB	41	Jose Marquez	Fr
ILB	31	Collin Miller	RFr
DL	45	A.J. Natter	Sr
DL	9	DaiShon Neal	So
OLB	3	Marcus Newby	Sr
DL	99	Peyton Newell	Jr
DL	76	Dylan Owen	Jr
DL	55	Jordan Paup	Fr
S	25	Antonio Reed	Jr
ILB	14	Avery Roberts	Fr
OLB	95	Ben Stille	RFr
DL	44	Mick Stoltenberg	Jr
DB	35	Jeremiah Stovall	So
DB	28	Eli Sullivan	RFr
DL	97	Deontre Thomas	Fr
LB	18	Guy Thomas	Fr
LB	52	Andrew Ward	Fr
ILB	49	Chris Weber (C)	Sr
ILB	57	Jacob Weinmaster	So
S	24	Aaron Williams	Jr
S	26	Kieron Williams	Sr
ILB	5	Dedrick Young II	Jr

Special teams

Pos.	#	Name	Class
P	98	Isaac Armstrong	So
PK	34	Drew Brown	Sr
PK	39	Cole Frahm	Fr
P	35	Caleb Lightbourn	So
LS	54	Jordan Ober	Jr
PK	95	Kramer Rath	Sr
LS	92	Chase Urbach	So
P	90	Jackson Walker	Jr

Head coach

- Mike Riley
  17th season
  3rd year at Nebraska
  Alma mater: Alabama

Coordinators/assistant coaches

- Danny Langsdorf
  12th season as OC/QB coach
  3rd year at Nebraska
  Alma mater: Linfield
- Bob Diaco
  7th season as DC coach
  1st year at Nebraska
  Alma mater: Iowa
- Mike Cavanaugh
  29th season as OL coach
  3rd year at Nebraska
  Alma mater: S Conn St
- Trent Bray
  8th season as LB coach
  3rd year at Nebraska
  Alma mater: Oregon State
- Reggie Davis
  9th season as RB coach
  3rd year at Nebraska
  Alma mater: Washington
- John Parrella
  5th season as DL coach
  2nd year at Nebraska
  Alma mater: Nebraska
- Keith Williams
  18th season as WR coach
  3rd year at Nebraska
  Alma mater: San Diego State
- Donte Williams
  10th season as CB coach
  1st year at Nebraska
  Alma mater: Idaho State
- Scott Booker
  5th season as Safeties/special teams coach
  1st year at Nebraska
  Alma mater: Kent State

Legend

- (C) Team captain
- (S) Suspended
- (I) Ineligible
- Injured
- Redshirt

Roster
Last update: May 25, 2021

=== Depth chart ===
Defense

FS
Aaron Williams
Kieron Williams
Marquel Dismuke
⋅

OLB	ILB	ILB	OLB
Alex Davis	Chris Weber	Dedrick Young	Marcus Newby; Luke Gifford (injured)
Ben Stille	Avery Roberts	Mohamed Barry	Tyrin Ferguson
Sedrick King	⋅	⋅	⋅

SS
Joshua Kalu
Antonio Reed
⋅

CB
Lamar Jackson
Dicaprio Bootle
⋅

DE	NT	DE
Freedom Akinmoladun	Mick Stoltenberg	Carlos Davis
Khalil Davis	Deontre Thomas	Daishon Neal
⋅	⋅	⋅

CB
Chris Jones (injured)
Eric Lee
Avery Anderson
⋅

Offense

WR
Stanley Morgan Jr.
Bryan Reimers
⋅

WR
De'Mornay Pierson-El
Tyjon Lindsey
⋅

LT	LG	C	RG	RT
Nick Gates	Jerald Foster	Cole Conrad; Michael Decker	Tanner Farmer	Brenden Jaimes
Christian Gaylord	John Raridon	John Raridon	Boe Wilson	David Kneval; Matt Farniok
⋅	⋅	⋅	⋅	⋅

TE
Tyler Hoppes
Connor Ketter
Jack Stoll

WR
JD Spielman
Conor Young
Gabe Rahn
⋅

QB
Tanner Lee
Patrick O'Brien
Tristan Gebbia

Key reserves
FB Luke Mcnitt
FB Austin Rose
Season-ending injury Number of games played ()
RB Tre Bryant (2)
S JoJo Domann (0)
OLB Luke Gifford (7)

Special teams
PK Drew Brown
P Caleb Lightbourn
KR JD Spielman
PR De'Mornay Pierson-El
LS Jordan Ober

RB
Devine Ozigbo
Mikale Wilbon
Jaylin Bradley
⋅

== Game summaries ==
=== Spring practice ===
2017 Red–White Spring Game

Team	1	2	3	4	Total
White	0	7	0	0	7
• Red	6	21	7	21	55

- Date: April 15, 2017
- Location: Memorial Stadium, Lincoln, NE
- Game start: 1:00 p.m.
- Game attendance: 78,312
- Game weather: Cloudy, Humidity 60%, 75°F, Wind SW 5 mph
- TV announcers (BTN2Go): Larry Punteney, Damon Benning, Ameer Abdullah

Scoring summary
1	11:50	Red	Drew Brown 35-yard field goal	Red 3–0
1	3:12	Red	Drew Brown 33-yard field goal	Red 6–0
2	12:07	White	Tristan Gebbia 4 run (Caleb Lightbourn kick)	White 7–6
2	8:03	Red	Devine Ozigbo 6 run (Drew Brown kick)	Red 13–7
2	5:35	Red	JD Spielman 30 pass from Tanner Lee (Drew Brown kick)	Red 20–7
2	0:21	Red	Mikale Wilbon 9 pass from Patrick O'Brien (Drew Brown kick)	Red 27–7
3	7:25	Red	Jack Stoll 9 pass from Tanner Lee (Drew Brown kick)	Red 34–7
4	14:03	Red	Wyatt Mazour 5 run (Drew Brown kick)	Red 41–7
3	12:25	Red	Tanner Hass 11 pass from Tanner Lee (Drew Brown kick)	Red 48–7
3	12:25	Red	Tanner Hass 15 pass from Tristan Gebbia (Drew Brown kick)	Red 55–7

=== Arkansas State ===
Arkansas State at Nebraska

Team	1	2	3	4	Total
Arkansas State	14	12	0	10	36
• Nebraska	17	10	7	9	43

- Date: September 2
- Location: Memorial Stadium
  Lincoln, NE
- Game start: 7:00 p.m. CDT
- Elapsed time: 3:52
- Game attendance: 90,171
- Game weather: 80 °F (27 °C), Clear, Sunny, Humidity 59%
- Referee: Curt Johnson
- TV announcers (BTN): Joe Beninati, Glen Mason, Elise Menaker

Scoring summary
1	9:52	Nebraska	Drew Brown 21-yard field goal	Nebraska 3–0
1	5:07	Arkansas State	Blaise Taylor 63-yard punt return (Sawyer Williams kick)	Arkansas State 7–3
1	4:53	Nebraska	JD Spielman 99-yard kickoff return (Drew Brown kick)	Nebraska 10–7
1	2:12	Arkansas State	Chris Murray 29-yard pass from Justice Hansen (Sawyer Williams kick)	Arkansas State 14–10
1	0:32	Nebraska	Stanley Morgan 44-yard pass from Tanner Lee (Drew Brown kick)	Nebraska 17–14
2	9:57	Nebraska	Mikale Wilbon 7-yard run (Drew Brown kick)	Nebraska 24–14
2	7:00	Arkansas State	Safety	Nebraska 24–16
2	3:45	Arkansas State	Blake Mack 3-yard pass from Justice Hansen (Sawyer Williams kick)	Nebraska 24–23
2	1:02	Nebraska	Drew Brown 41-yard field goal	Nebraska 27–23
2	0:00	Arkansas State	Sawyer Williams 39-yard field goal	Nebraska 27–26
3	11:14	Nebraska	Tre Bryant 1-yard run (Drew Brown kick)	Nebraska 34–26
4	12:25	Nebraska	D'Mornay Pierson-El 8-yard pass from Tanner Lee (Drew Brown kick)	Nebraska 41–26
4	9:27	Arkansas State	Sawyer Williams 31-yard field goal	Nebraska 41–29
4	5:52	Nebraska	Safety	Nebraska 43–29
4	0:47	Arkansas State	Kendrick Edwards 3-yard pass from Justice Hansen (Sawyer Williams kick)	Nebraska 43–36

Arkansas State Game starters

Position	Player
Quarterback	Tanner Lee
Running Back	Tre Bryant
Wide Receiver	Stanley Morgon
Wide Receiver	De'mornay Pierson-El
Wide Receiver	JD Speilman
Tight End	Tyler Hoppes
Left Tackle	David Kneval
Left Guard	Jerlad Foster
Center	Cole Conrad
Right Guard	Tanner Farmer
Right Tackle	Nick Gates

Position	Player
Defensive End	Carlos Davis
Nose Tackle	Mick Stoltenberg
Defensive End	Freedom Akinmoladun
Outside Linebacker	Luke Gifford
Inside Linebacker	Dedrick Young
Inside Linebacker	Chris Weber
Outside Linebacker	Marcus Newby
Cornerback	Eric Lee
Strong Safety	Joshua Kalu
Free Safety	Aaron Williams
Cornerback	Lamar Jackson

=== At Oregon ===
Nebraska at Oregon

Team	1	2	3	4	Total
Nebraska	7	7	14	7	35
• Oregon	21	21	0	0	42

- Date: September 9
- Location: Autzen Stadium
  Eugene, OR
- Game start: 3:30 p.m. CDT
- Elapsed time: 3:35
- Game attendance: 58,389
- Game weather: Party cloudy, 74 degrees, Wind WSW @ 4 mph
- Referee: John O'Neill
- TV announcers (FOX): Joe Davis, Brady Quinn, Bruce Feldman

Scoring summary
1	13:42	Oregon	Brenden Schooler 32-yard pass from Justin Herbert(Aiden Schneider kick)	Oregon 7–0
1	11:31	Oregon	Charles Nelson 8-yard pass from Justin Herbert (Aiden Schneider kick)	Oregon 14–0
1	3:03	Nebraska	De'Mornay Pierson-El 23-yard pass from Tanner Lee (Drew Brown kick)	Oregon 14–7
1	0:00	Oregon	Royce Freeman 2-yard run (Aiden Schneider kick)	Oregon 21–7
2	13:26	Nebraska	Tre Bryant 5-yard run (Drew Brown kick)	Oregon 21–14
2	7:10	Oregon	Royce Freeman 1-yard run (Aiden Schneider kick)	Oregon 28–14
2	2:40	Oregon	Kani Benoit 5-yard run (Aiden Schneider kick)	Oregon 35–14
2	0:39	Oregon	Dillon Mitchell 17-yard pass from Justin Herbert (Aiden Schneider kick)	Oregon 42–14
3	12:50	Nebraska	Stanley Morgan 18-yard pass from Tanner Lee (Drew Brown kick)	Oregon 42–21
3	8:52	Nebraska	Stanley Morgan 28-yard pass from Tanner Lee (Drew Brown kick)	Oregon 42–28
4	2:47	Nebraska	Mikale Wilbon 2-yard run (Drew Brown kick)	Oregon 42–35

Oregon Game starters

Position	Player
Quarterback	Tanner Lee
Running Back	Tre Bryant
Wide Receiver	Stanley Morgon
Wide Receiver	De'mornay Pierson-El
Wide Receiver	JD Speilman
Tight End	Tyler Hoppes
Left Tackle	Matt Farnoik
Left Guard	Jerlad Foster
Center	Cole Conrad
Right Guard	Tanner Farmer
Right Tackle	Nick Gates

Position	Player
Defensive End	Carlos Davis
Nose Tackle	Mick Stoltenberg
Defensive End	Freedom Akinmoladun
Outside Linebacker	Luke Gifford
Inside Linebacker	Dedrick Young
Inside Linebacker	Chris Weber
Outside Linebacker	Marcus Newby
Cornerback	Eric Lee
Strong Safety	Joshua Kalu
Free Safety	Aaron Williams
Cornerback	Lamar Jackson

=== Northern Illinois ===
Northern Illinois at Nebraska

Team	1	2	3	4	Total
• Northern Illinois	14	0	0	7	21
Nebraska	0	0	10	7	17

- Date: September 16
- Location: Memorial Stadium
  Lincoln, NE
- Game start: 11:00 a.m. CDT
- Elapsed time: 3:15
- Game attendance: 89,664
- Game weather: Overcast, 74 deg, Wind SSE @ 8–13 mph
- TV announcers (FS1): Tim Brando, Spencer Tillman, Les Miles, Holly Sonders

Scoring summary
1	11:24	Northern Illinois	Shawun Lurry 87-yard interception return (Christian Hagan kick)	Northern Illinois 7–0
1	1:13	Northern Illinois	Lawuan Johnson 25-yard interception return (Christian Hagan kick)	Northern Illinois 14–0
3	8:05	Nebraska	Tanner Lee 4-yard run (Drew Brown kick)	Northern Illinois 14–7
3	0:15	Nebraska	Drew Brown 36-yard field goal	Northern Illinois 14–10
4	11:14	Nebraska	Tanner Lee 1-yard run (Drew Brown kick)	Nebraska 17–14
4	8:52	Northern Illinois	Jordan Huff 2-yard run (Christian Hagan kick)	Northern Illinois 21–17

Northern Illinois Game starters

Position	Player
Quarterback	Tanner Lee
Running Back	Mikale Wilbon
Wide Receiver	Stanley Morgon
Wide Receiver	De'mornay Pierson-El
Wide Receiver	JD Speilman
Tight End	Tyler Hoppes
Left Tackle	Matt Farnoik
Left Guard	Jerald Foster
Center	Cole Conrad
Right Guard	Tanner Farmer
Right Tackle	Nick Gates

Position	Player
Defensive End	Carlos Davis
Nose Tackle	Mick Stoltenberg
Defensive End	Freedom Akinmoladun
Outside Linebacker	Luke Gifford
Inside Linebacker	Dedrick Young
Inside Linebacker	Chris Weber
Outside Linebacker	Marcus Newby
Cornerback	Eric Lee
Strong Safety	Antonio Reed
Free Safety	Aaron Williams
Cornerback	Lamar Jackson

=== Rutgers ===
Rutgers at Nebraska

Team	1	2	3	4	Total
Rutgers	7	3	7	0	17
• Nebraska	7	7	7	6	27

- Date: September 23
- Location: Memorial Stadium
  Lincoln, NE
- Game start: 2:30 p.m. CDT
- Elapsed time: 3:13
- Game attendance: 89,775
- Game weather: Mostly sunny, 91 degrees, Wind SSE @ 15 mph
- Referee: Michael Cannon
- TV announcers (BTN): Brandon Gaudin, Glen Mason, Elise Menaker

Scoring summary
1	10:28	Rutgers	Gus Edwards 2-yard run (Andrew Harte kick)	Rutgers 7–0
1	6:52	Nebraska	J.D. Spielman 18-yard pass from Tanner Lee (Drew Brown kick)	7–7
2	10:20	Rutgers	Andrew Harte 33-yard field goal	Rutgers 10–7
2	4:48	Nebraska	Mikale Wilbon 4-yard run (Drew Brown kick)	Nebraska 14–10
3	14:07	Rutgers	Kiy Hester 33-yard interception return (Andrew Harte kick)	Rutgers 17–14
3	2:49	Nebraska	De'Mornay Pierson-El 8-yard pass from Tanner Lee (Drew Brown kick)	Nebraska 21–17
4	14:10	Nebraska	Drew Brown 32-yard field goal	Nebraska 24–17
4	5:59	Nebraska	Drew Brown 27-yard field goal	Nebraska 27–17

Rutgers Game starters

Position	Player
Quarterback	Tanner Lee
Running Back	Mikale Wilbon
Wide Receiver	Gabe Rahn
Wide Receiver	De'mornay Pierson-El
Wide Receiver	JD Speilman
Tight End	Tyler Hoppes
Left Tackle	Branden Jaimes
Left Guard	Jerlad Foster
Center	Michael Decker
Right Guard	Tanner Farmer
Right Tackle	Nick Gates

Position	Player
Defensive End	Carlos Davis
Nose Tackle	Mick Stoltenberg
Defensive End	Freedom Akinmoladun
Outside Linebacker	Luke Gifford
Inside Linebacker	Dedrick Young
Inside Linebacker	Chris Weber
Outside Linebacker	Marcus Newby
Cornerback	Eric Lee
Strong Safety	Antonio Reed
Free Safety	Aaron Williams
Cornerback	Lamar Jackson

=== At Illinois ===
Nebraska at Illinois

Team	1	2	3	4	Total
• Nebraska	7	14	0	7	28
Illinois	0	3	3	0	6

- Date: September 29
- Location: Memorial Stadium
  Champaign, IL
- Game start: 7:00 p.m. CDT
- Elapsed time: 3:05
- Game attendance: 43,058
- Game weather: 69 degrees, clear, Wind N @ 9 mph
- Referee: Jerry McGinn
- TV announcers (FS1): Justin Kutcher, Mark Helfrich, Petros Papadakis, Jen Hale

Scoring summary
1	8:57	Nebraska	De'Mornay Pierson-El 45-yard pass from Tanner Lee (Drew Brown kick)	Nebraska 7–0
2	14:57	Illinois	Chase McLaughlin 25-yard field goal	Nebraska 7–3
2	10:38	Nebraska	Devine Ozigbo 15-yard run (Drew Brown kick)	Nebraska 14–3
2	1:23	Nebraska	Tyler Hoppes 6-yard pass from Tanner Lee (Drew Brown kick)	Nebraska 21–3
3	7:49	Illinois	Chase McLaughlin 25-yard field goal	Nebraska 21–6
4	13:34	Nebraska	Stanley Morgan 23-yard pass from Tanner Lee (Drew Brown kick)	Nebraska 28–6

Illinois Game starters

Position	Player
Quarterback	Tanner Lee
Running Back	Devine Ozigbo
Wide Receiver	Stanley Morgan
Wide Receiver	De'mornay Pierson-El
Wide Receiver	JD Speilman
Tight End	Tyler Hoppes
Left Tackle	Branden Jaimes
Left Guard	Jerald Foster
Center	Michael Decker
Right Guard	Tanner Farmer
Right Tackle	Nick Gates

Position	Player
Defensive End	Carlos Davis
Nose Tackle	Mick Stoltenberg
Defensive End	Freedom Akinmoladun
Outside Linebacker	Luke Gifford
Inside Linebacker	Dedrick Young
Inside Linebacker	Chris Weber
Outside Linebacker	Sedrick King
Cornerback	Eric Lee
Strong Safety	Antonio Reed
Free Safety	Aaron Williams
Cornerback	Lamar Jackson

=== Wisconsin ===
Wisconsin at Nebraska
Freedom Trophy

Team	1	2	3	4	Total
• #9 Wisconsin	10	7	7	14	38
Nebraska	0	10	7	0	17

- Date: October 7
- Location: Memorial Stadium
  Lincoln, NE
- Game start: 7:00 p.m. CDT
- Elapsed time: 3:30
- Game attendance: 89,860
- Game weather: Clear, 69 degrees, Wind SW @ 7 mph
- Referee: Jeff Servinski
- TV announcers (BTN): Kevin Kugler, Matt Millen, Lisa Byington

Scoring summary
1	12:34	Wisconsin	Chris Orr 78-yard interception return (Rafael Gaglianone kick)	Wisconsin 7–0
1	3:31	Wisconsin	Rafael Gaglianone 37-yard field goal	Wisconsin 10–0
2	1:20	Nebraska	Stanley Morgan 80-yard pass from Tanner Lee (Drew Brown kick)	Wisconsin 10–7
2	1:09	Wisconsin	Jonathan Taylor 75-yard run (Rafael Gaglianone kick)	Wisconsin 17–7
2	0:00	Nebraska	Drew Brown 32-yard field goal	Wisconsin 17–10
3	10:43	Nebraska	Aaron Williams 14-yard interception return (Drew Brown kick)	17–17
3	4:56	Wisconsin	Quintez Cephus 5-yard pass from Alex Hornibrook (Rafael Gaglianone kick)	Wisconsin 24–17
4	9:08	Wisconsin	Jonathan Taylor 2-yard run (Rafael Gaglianone kick)	Wisconsin 31–17
4	2:40	Wisconsin	Bradrick Shaw 1-yard run (Rafael Gaglianone kick)	Wisconsin 38–17

Wisconsin Game starters

Position	Player
Quarterback	Tanner Lee
Running Back	Devine Ozigbo
Wide Receiver	Stanley Morgon
Wide Receiver	De'mornay Pierson-El
Wide Receiver	JD Speilman
Tight End	Tyler Hoppes
Left Tackle	Branden Jaimes
Left Guard	Jerlad Foster
Center	Michael Decker
Right Guard	Tanner Farmer
Right Tackle	Nick Gates

Position	Player
Defensive End	Carlos Davis
Nose Tackle	Mick Stoltenberg
Defensive End	Freedom Akinmoladun
Outside Linebacker	Luke Gifford
Inside Linebacker	Dedrick Young
Inside Linebacker	Chris Weber
Outside Linebacker	Ben Stille
Cornerback	Eric Lee
Strong Safety	Joshua Kalu
Free Safety	Aaron Williams
Cornerback	Lamar Jackson

=== Ohio State ===
Ohio State at Nebraska

Team	1	2	3	4	Total
• #9 Ohio State	14	21	14	7	56
Nebraska	0	0	14	0	14

- Date: October 14
- Location: Memorial Stadium
  Lincoln, NE
- Game start: 6:30 p.m. CDT
- Elapsed time: 3:21
- Game attendance: 89,346
- Game weather: Overcast, 58 degrees, Wind WNW @ 8 mph
- Referee: Don Capron
- TV announcers (FS1): Gus Johnson, Joel Klatt, Jenny Taft

Scoring summary
1	10:47	Ohio State	J. K. Dobbins 52-yard run (Sean Nuernberger kick)	Ohio State 7–0
1	5:39	Ohio State	J. T. Barrett 6-yard run (Sean Nuernberger kick)	Ohio State 14–0
2	13:37	Ohio State	K. J. Hill 16-yard pass from J.T. Barrett (Sean Nuernberger kick)	Ohio State 21–0
2	8:20	Ohio State	Terry McLaurin 31-yard pass from J.T. Barrett (Sean Nuernberger kick)	Ohio State 28–0
2	1:10	Ohio State	J.T. Barrett 3-yard run (Sean Nuernberger kick)	Ohio State 35–0
3	11:29	Ohio State	Rashod Berry 16-yard pass from J.T. Barrett (Sean Nuernberger kick)	Ohio State 42–0
3	11:05	Nebraska	JD Spielman 77-yard pass from Tanner Lee (Drew Brown kick)	Ohio State 42–7
3	7:49	Ohio State	Marcus Baugh 18-yard pass from J.T. Barrett (Sean Nuernberger kick)	Ohio State 49–7
3	5:52	Nebraska	Stanley Morgan Jr. 17-yard pass from Tanner Lee (Drew Brown kick)	Ohio State 49–14
4	14:20	Ohio State	K.J. Hill 6-yard pass from J.T. Barrett
3	5:52	Nebraska	Stanley Morgan Jr. 17-yard pass from Tanner Lee (Drew Brown kick)	Ohio State 49–14
Ohio State 56–14

Ohio State Game starters

Position	Player
Quarterback	Tanner Lee
Running Back	Mikale Wilbon
Wide Receiver	Conor Young
Wide Receiver	De'mornay Pierson-El
Wide Receiver	JD Speilman
Tight End	Tyler Hoppes
Left Tackle	Branden Jaimes
Left Guard	Jerald Foster
Center	Michael Decker
Right Guard	Tanner Farmer
Right Tackle	Nick Gates

Position	Player
Defensive End	Carlos Davis
Nose Tackle	Mick Stoltenberg
Defensive End	Freedom Akinmoladun
Outside Linebacker	Luke Gifford
Inside Linebacker	Dedrick Young
Inside Linebacker	Chris Weber
Outside Linebacker	Sedrick King
Cornerback	Chris Jones
Strong Safety	Joshua Kalu
Free Safety	Dicaprio Bootle
Cornerback	Lamar Jackson

=== At Purdue ===
Nebraska at Purdue

Team	1	2	3	4	Total
• Nebraska	3	3	6	13	25
Purdue	0	14	3	7	24

- Date: October 28
- Location: Ross–Ade Stadium
  West Lafayette, IN
- Game start: 6:30 p.m. CDT
- Elapsed time: 3:26
- Game attendance: 41,411
- Game weather: Cloudy, 38 degrees, Wind NW @ 12 mph
- Referee: Don Willard
- TV announcers (BTN): Brandon Gaudin, Glen Mason, Michelle McMahon

Scoring summary
1	11:42	Nebraska	Drew Brown 44-yard field goal	Nebraska 3–0
2	12:30	Purdue	Richie Worship 4-yard run (J.D. Dellinger kick)	Purdue 7–3
2	7:04	Nebraska	Drew Brown 21-yard field goal	Purdue 7–6
2	0:24	Purdue	David Blough 5-yard run (Spencer Evans kick)	Purdue 14–6
3	9:57	Nebraska	Drew Brown 37-yard field goal	Purdue 14–9
3	6:24	Purdue	Spencer Evans 20-yard field goal	Purdue 17–9
3	2:06	Nebraska	Drew Brown 25-yard field goal	Purdue 17–12
4	14:23	Purdue	Jackson Anthrop 14-yard pass from David Blough (J.D. Dellinger kick)	Purdue 24–12
4	11:03	Nebraska	Tyler Hoppes 27-yard pass from Tanner Lee (Drew Brown kick)	Purdue 24–19
4	0:14	Nebraska	Stanley Morgan Jr. 13-yard pass from Tanner Lee (2-pt PAT failed)	Nebraska 25–24

Purdue Game starters

Position	Player
Quarterback	Tanner Lee
Running Back	Devine Ozigbo
Wide Receiver	Stanley Morgan
Wide Receiver	De'mornay Pierson-El
Wide Receiver	Tyjon Linsdey
Tight End	Tyler Hoppes
Left Tackle	Branden Jaimes
Left Guard	Jerald Foster
Center	Michael Decker
Right Guard	Tanner Farmer
Right Tackle	Nick Gates

Position	Player
Defensive End	Carlos Davis
Nose Tackle	Mick Stoltenberg
Defensive End	Freedom Akinmoladun
Outside Linebacker	Marcus Newby
Inside Linebacker	Mohamed Barry
Inside Linebacker	Chris Weber
Outside Linebacker	Alex Davis
Cornerback	Chris Jones
Strong Safety	Joshua Kalu
Free Safety	Aaron Williams
Cornerback	Lamar Jackson

=== Northwestern ===
Northwestern at Nebraska

Team	1	2	3	4	OT	Total
• Northwestern	7	10	0	7	7	31
Nebraska	7	7	10	0	0	24

- Date: November 4
- Location: Memorial Stadium
  Lincoln, NE
- Game start: 2:30 p.m. CDT
- Elapsed time: 3:19
- Game attendance: 89,721
- Game weather: Sunny, 54 degrees, Wind SW @ 5–10 mph
- Referee: Jerry McGinn
- TV announcers (BTN): Kevin Kugler, Matt Millen, Lisa Byington

Scoring summary
1	9:36	Northwestern	Justin Jackson 17-yard run (Charlie Kuhbander kick)	Northwestern 7–0
1	0:33	Nebraska	Bryan Reimers 22-yard pass from Tanner Lee (Drew Brown kick)	7–7
2	9:06	Northwestern	Jeremy Larkin 24-yard run (Charlie Kuhbander kick)	Northwestern 14–7
2	8:21	Nebraska	Jack Stoll 32-yard pass from Tanner Lee (Drew Brown kick)	14–14
2	1:12	Northwestern	Charlie Kuhbander 24-yard field goal	Northwestern 17–14
3	14:08	Nebraska	Marcus Newby 49-yard interception return (Drew Brown kick)	Nebraska 21–17
3	3:04	Nebraska	Drew Brown 23-yard field goal	Nebraska 24–17
4	5:32	Northwestern	Clayton Thorson 7-yard run (Charlie Kuhbander kick)	24–24
OT	0:00	Northwestern	Clayton Thorson 1-yard run (Charlie Kuhbander kick)	Northwestern 31–24

Northwestern Game starters

Position	Player
Quarterback	Tanner Lee
Running Back	Devine Ozigbo
Wide Receiver	Stanley Morgan
Wide Receiver	De'mornay Pierson-El
Wide Receiver	JD Speilman
Tight End	Tyler Hoppes
Left Tackle	Branden Jaimes
Left Guard	Jerald Foster
Center	Cole Conrad
Right Guard	Matt Farniok
Right Tackle	Nick Gates

Position	Player
Defensive End	Carlos Davis
Nose Tackle	Mick Stoltenberg
Defensive End	Freedom Akinmoladun
Outside Linebacker	Marcus Newby
Inside Linebacker	Dedrick Young
Inside Linebacker	Chris Weber
Outside Linebacker	Alex Davis
Cornerback	Chris Jones
Strong Safety	Joshua Kalu
Free Safety	Marquel Dismuke
Cornerback	Lamar Jackson

=== At Minnesota ===
Nebraska at Minnesota
$5 Bits of Broken Chair Trophy

Team	1	2	3	4	Total
Nebraska	7	7	0	7	21
• Minnesota	14	16	10	14	54

- Date: November 11
- Location: TCF Bank Stadium
  Minneapolis, MN
- Game start: 11:00 a.m. CDT
- Elapsed time: 3:12
- Game attendance: 39,933
- Game weather: Sunny, 36 degrees, Wind SSW @ 12 mph
- Referee: Mark Kluczynski
- TV announcers (FS1): Brian Custer, Ben Leber

Scoring summary
1	14:47	Minnesota	Rodney Smith 100-yard kickoff return (Emmit Carpenter kick)	Minnesota 7–0
1	8:57	Nebraska	Mikale Wilbon 1-yard run (Drew Brown kick)	7–7
1	3:08	Minnesota	Demry Croft 3-yard run (Emmit Carpenter kick)	Minnesota 14–7
2	11:42	Minnesota	Demry Croft 73-yard run (Emmit Carpenter PAT failed)	Minnesota 20–7
2	6:40	Minnesota	Kobe McCrary 11-yard run (Emmit Carpenter kick)	Minnesota 27–7
2	2:50	Nebraska	Tyler Hoppes 14-yard pass from Tanner Lee (Drew Brown kick)	Minnesota 27–14
2	0:04	Minnesota	Emmit Carpenter 36-yard field goal	Minnesota 30–14
3	5:06	Minnesota	Kobe McCrary 9-yard run (Emmit Carpenter kick)	Minnesota 37–14
3	1:13	Minnesota	Emmit Carpenter 30-yard field goal	Minnesota 40–14
4	10:17	Nebraska	Devine Ozigbo 1-yard run (Drew Brown kick)	Minnesota 40–21
4	7:05	Minnesota	Demry Croft 1-yard run (Emmit Carpenter kick)	Minnesota 47–21
4	3:21	Minnesota	Kobe McCrary 43-yard run (Emmit Carpenter kick)	Minnesota 54–21

Minnesota Game starters

Position	Player
Quarterback	Tanner Lee
Running Back	Mikale Wilbon
Wide Receiver	Stanley Morgan
Wide Receiver	De'mornay Pierson-El
Wide Receiver	JD Speilman
Tight End	Tyler Hoppes
Left Tackle	Branden Jaimes
Left Guard	Jerlad Foster
Center	Cole Conrad
Right Guard	Matt Farniok
Right Tackle	Nick Gates

Position	Player
Defensive End	Carlos Davis
Nose Tackle	Mick Stoltenberg
Defensive End	Freedom Akinmoladun
Outside Linebacker	Marcus Newby
Inside Linebacker	Dedrick Young
Inside Linebacker	Chris Weber
Outside Linebacker	Alex Davis
Cornerback	Chris Jones
Strong Safety	Joshua Kalu
Free Safety	Antonio Reed
Cornerback	Lamar Jackson

=== At Penn State ===
Nebraska at Penn State

Team	1	2	3	4	Total
Nebraska	10	0	14	20	44
• #13 Penn State	14	28	0	14	56

- Date: November 18
- Location: Beaver Stadium
  University Park, PA
- Game start: 3:00 p.m. CDT
- Elapsed time: 3:42
- Game attendance: 106,722
- Game weather: Damp, 39 degrees, cloudy, Wind S @ 12 mph
- Referee: Ron Snodgrass
- TV announcers (FS1): Justin Kutcher, Mark Helfrich

Scoring summary
1	14:03	Penn State	Saquon Barkley 65-yard run (Tyler Davis kick)	Penn State 7–0
1	9:18	Nebraska	Drew Brown 27-yard field goal	Penn State 7–3
1	6:17	Nebraska	Devine Ozigbo 1-yard run (Drew Brown kick)	Nebraska 10–7
1	2:40	Penn State	Saquon Barkley 1-yard run (Tyler Davis kick)	Penn State 14–10
2	11:53	Penn State	Trace McSorley 9-yard run (Tyler Davis kick)	Penn State 21–10
2	9:23	Penn State	Mike Gesicki 9-yard pass from Trace McSorley (Tyler Davis kick)	Penn State 28–10
2	4:36	Penn State	Saquon Barkley 8-yard run (Tyler Davis kick)	Penn State 35–10
2	1:19	Penn State	DeAndre Thompkins 15-yard pass from Trace McSorley (Tyler Davis kick)	Penn State 42–10
3	6:40	Nebraska	Mikale Wilbon 24-yard run (Drew Brown kick)	Penn State 42–17
3	2:34	Nebraska	De'Mornay Pierson-El 22-yard pass from Tanner Lee (Drew Brown kick)	Penn State 42–24
4	13:59	Penn State	Mike Gesikci 17-yard pass from Trace McSorley (Tyler Davis kick)	Penn State 49–24
4	10:13	Penn State	Nick Bowers 15-yard pass from Tommy Stevens (Tyler Davis kick)	Penn State 56–24
4	6:32	Nebraska	Stanley Morgan Jr. 8-yard pass from Tanner Lee (Drew Brown kick)	Penn State 56–31
4	1:20	Nebraska	Mikale Wilbon 1-yard run (Drew Brown kick)	Penn State 56–38
4	0:00	Nebraska	Jack Stoll 3-yard pass from Tanner Lee (no PAT attempted)	Penn State 56–44

Penn State Game starters

Position	Player
Quarterback	Tanner Lee
Running Back	Mikale Wilbon
Wide Receiver	Stanley Morgan
Wide Receiver	De'mornay Pierson-El
Wide Receiver	JD Speilman
Tight End	Tyler Hoppes
Left Tackle	Branden Jaimes
Left Guard	Jerald Foster
Center	Cole Conrad
Right Guard	David Kneval
Right Tackle	Nick Gates

Position	Player
Defensive End	Carlos Davis
Nose Tackle	Mick Stoltenberg
Defensive End	Freedom Akinmoladun
Outside Linebacker	Marcus Newby
Inside Linebacker	Dedrick Young
Inside Linebacker	Chris Weber
Outside Linebacker	Alex Davis
Cornerback	Chris Jones
Strong Safety	Joshua Kalu
Free Safety	Kieron Williams
Cornerback	Lamar Jackson

=== Iowa ===
Iowa at Nebraska
Heroes Trophy

Team	1	2	3	4	Total
• Iowa	7	7	28	14	56
Nebraska	7	7	0	0	14

- Date: November 24
- Location: Memorial Stadium
  Lincoln, NE
- Game start: 3:00 p.m. CST
- Elapsed time: 3:05
- Game attendance: 90,046
- Game weather: Sunny, 69 degrees, Wind NNW @ 16 mph
- Referee: Don Capron
- TV announcers (FS1): Mark Followill, Danny Kanell

Scoring summary
1	9:34	Nebraska	Stanley Morgan 14-yard pass from Tanner Lee (Drew Brown kick)	Nebraska 7–0
1	2:16	Iowa	Akrum Wadley 20-yard run (Miguel Recinos kick)	7–7
2	6:18	Nebraska	Stanley Morgan 28-yard pass from Tanner Lee (Drew Brown kick)	Nebraska 14–7
2	0:25	Iowa	Noah Fant 4-yard pass from Nate Stanley (Miguel Recinos kick)	14–14
3	12:24	Iowa	Akrum Wadley 1-yard run (Miguel Recinos kick)	Iowa 21–14
3	9:53	Iowa	James Butler 12-yard run (Miguel Recinos kick)	Iowa 28–14
3	8:32	Iowa	Akrum Wadley 29-yard run (Miguel Recinos kick)	Iowa 35–14
3	1:20	Iowa	Noah Fant 68-yard pass from Nate Stanley (Miguel Recinos kick)	Iowa 42–14
4	9:24	Iowa	Toren Young 3-yard run (Miguel Recinos kick)	Iowa 49–14
4	6:34	Iowa	Ivory Kelly-Martin 5-yard run (Miguel Recinos kick)	Iowa 56–14

Iowa Game starters

Position	Player
Quarterback	Tanner Lee
Running Back	Mikale Wilbon
Wide Receiver	Stanley Morgan
Wide Receiver	Keyan Williams
Wide Receiver	De'mornay Pierson-El
Tight End	Tyler Hoppes
Left Tackle	Branden Jaimes
Left Guard	Jerald Foster
Center	Cole Conrad
Right Guard	David Kneval
Right Tackle	Nick Gates

Position	Player
Defensive End	Carlos Davis
Nose Tackle	Mick Stoltenberg
Defensive End	Freedom Akinmoladun
Outside Linebacker	Marcus Newby
Inside Linebacker	Dedrick Young
Inside Linebacker	Chris Weber
Outside Linebacker	Alex Davis
Cornerback	Chris Jones
Strong Safety	Joshua Kalu
Free Safety	Aaron Williams
Cornerback	Lamar Jackson

== Big Ten awards ==
=== Player of the Week Honors ===
Weekly Awards
Player	Award	Week Awarded	Ref.
Ben Stille	Big Ten Freshman of the Week	Week 5	

=== All-Conference awards ===
2017 Big Ten All-Conference Teams and Awards

Media All-Big Ten
Position	Player	Team
WR	Stanley Morgan Jr.	Second Team
WR	JD Spielman	Third Team
OL	Jerald Foster	Honorable Mention
OL	Nick Gates	Honorable Mention
K	Drew Brown	Honorable Mention
PR	De'Mornay Pierson-El	Honorable Mention
KR	JD Spielman	Honorable Mention

Coaches All-Big Ten
Position	Player	Team
WR	Stanley Morgan Jr.	Second Team
WR	JD Spielman	Honorable Mention
OL	Jerald Foster	Honorable Mention
OL	Nick Gates	Honorable Mention
K	Drew Brown	Honorable Mention
KR	JD Spielman	Honorable Mention

== National awards ==
USA Today Freshman All-American
JD Spielman

FWAA Freshman All-American
JD Spielman

== Team awards ==
2016 Nebraska Football Team Awards

Annual Program Awards
Award	Player
Scout Team Defensive MVP	–
Scout Team Offensive MVP	–
Scout Team Special Teams MVP	–
Walk-On of the Year	–
Most Improved Player	–
Newcomer of the Year	–
Pat Clare Award	–
Tom Novak Trophy	Chris Weber
Guy Chamberlin Trophy	Drew Brown
Cletus Fischer Native Son Award	Luke McNitt
Lunch Bucket Award	–
Lifter of the Year	–
Husker Pride Award	–

== Players in the 2018 NFL draft ==
Player	Position	Round	Pick	NFL club
Tanner Lee	QB	6	203	Jacksonville Jaguars

== Rankings ==
Ranking movements Legend: ██ Increase in ranking ██ Decrease in ranking — = Not ranked RV = Received votes
	Week															
Poll	Pre	1	2	3	4	5	6	7	8	9	10	11	12	13	14	Final
AP	RV	RV	—	—	—	—	—	—	—	—	—	—	—	—	—	—
Coaches	RV	RV	—	—	—	—	—	—	—	—	—	—	—	—	—	—
CFP	Not released									—	—	—	—	—	—	Not released
