= Luke McNitt =

American football player (born 1994)

Arizona Wildcats
- Title: Graduate assistant

Personal information
- Born: April 20, 1994 (age 32); Kearney, Nebraska, U.S.
- Listed height: 6 ft 2 in (1.88 m)
- Listed weight: 249 lb (113 kg)

Career information
- High school: Kearney (Kearney, Nebraska)
- College: Nebraska
- NFL draft: 2018: undrafted

Career history

Playing
- Atlanta Falcons (2018)*; Minnesota Vikings (2018)*
- * Offseason or practice squad member only

Coaching
- Arizona (2020–present) Graduate assistant

Luke McNitt (born April 20, 1994) is an American former football fullback. He played college football at Nebraska. McNitt put up 26 reps of 225 pounds on the bench press at Nebraska pro day. He signed with the Atlanta Falcons as an undrafted free agent in 2018.

== Professional career ==
=== Atlanta Falcons ===
McNitt signed with the Atlanta Falcons as an undrafted free agent on May 1, 2018. He was waived on August 20, 2018.

=== Minnesota Vikings ===
On August 21, 2018, McNitt was claimed off waivers by the Minnesota Vikings. He was waived on August 31, 2018.
