= Steve Apke =

American football player (born 1965)

No. 90
- Position: Linebacker

Personal information
- Born: August 3, 1965 (age 61); Cincinnati, Ohio, U.S.
- Listed height: 6 ft 1 in (1.85 m)
- Listed weight: 222 lb (101 kg)

Career information
- High school: Moeller (Cincinnati)
- College: Pittsburgh
- NFL draft: 1987: undrafted

Career history
- Pittsburgh Steelers (1987); San Francisco 49ers (1988)*
- * Offseason or practice squad member only

Career NFL statistics
- Games played: 3
- Stats at Pro Football Reference

Steven James Apke (born August 3, 1965) is an American former professional football player who was a linebacker in the National Football League (NFL). He played college football for the Pittsburgh Panthers. Apke was a replacement player whose career spanned three games during the NFL's 1987 player's strike. He is the father of former Washington Commanders player Troy Apke.
