= Tanner Lee =

American football player (born 1995)

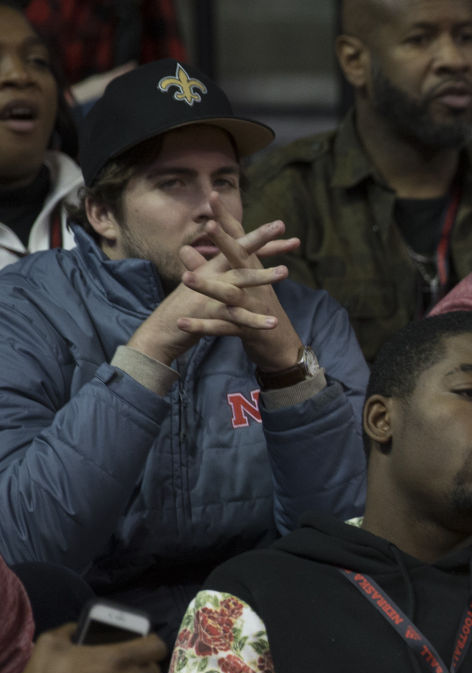
- Lee in 2017

No. 3
- Position: Quarterback

Personal information
- Born: February 14, 1995 (age 31); New Orleans, Louisiana, U.S.
- Listed height: 6 ft 4 in (1.93 m)
- Listed weight: 217 lb (98 kg)

Career information
- High school: Jesuit (New Orleans)
- College: Tulane (2014–2015); Nebraska (2016–2017)
- NFL draft: 2018: 6th round, 203rd overall pick

Career history
- Jacksonville Jaguars (2018)
- Stats at Pro Football Reference

Tanner Joseph Lee (born February 14, 1995) is an American former professional football player who was a quarterback for the Jacksonville Jaguars of the National Football League (NFL). He played college football for the Tulane Green Wave and Nebraska Cornhuskers.

== Early life ==
Lee was born in New Orleans, Louisiana and was raised in Destrehan, Louisiana. He attended Jesuit High School, where he played both football and baseball for the Blue Jays. In his career, he led the Blue Jays football to a 30–8 record while passing for 3,984 yards, 39 touchdowns, and nine interceptions.

== College career ==
=== 2014 season ===
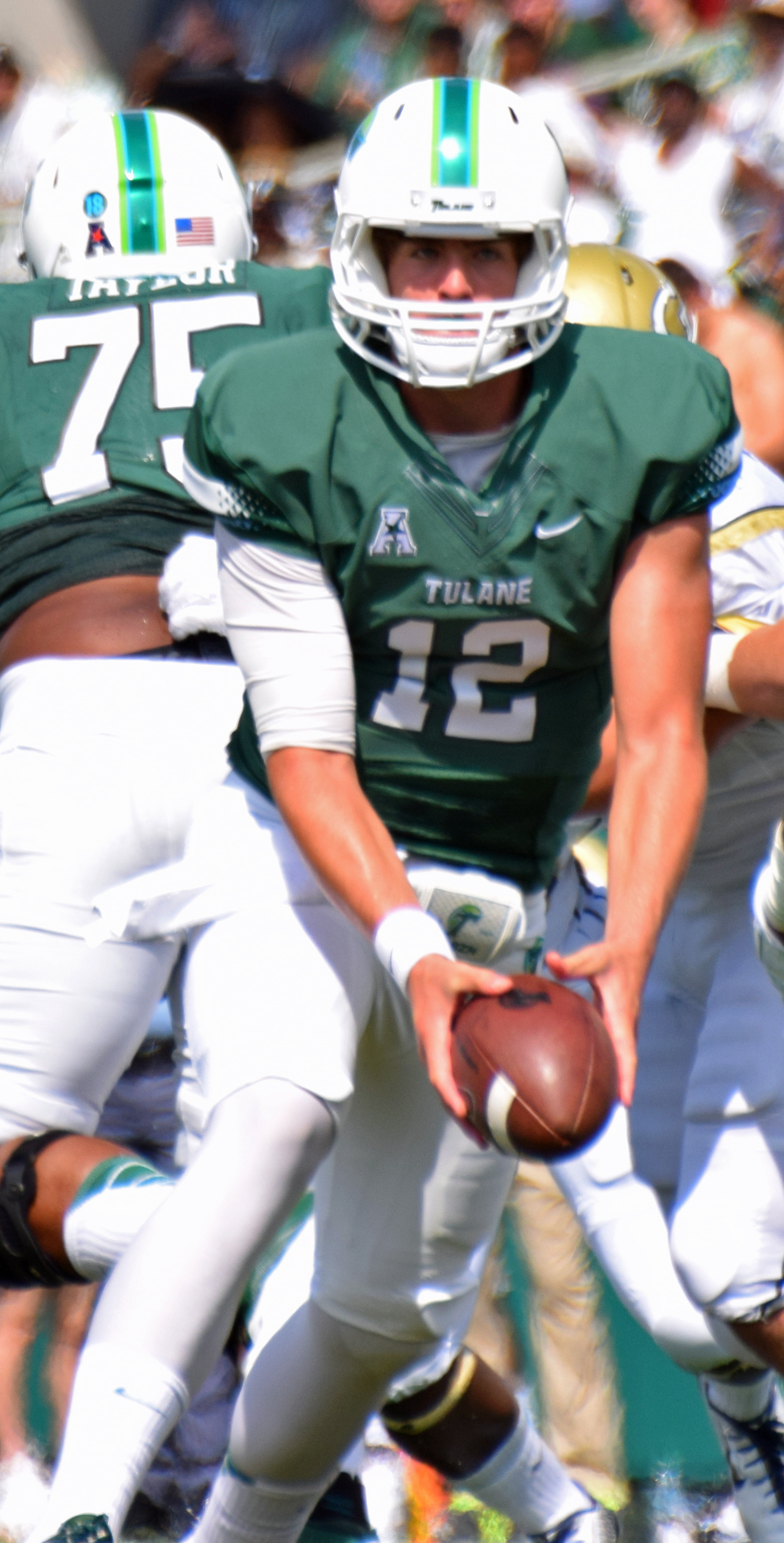
Lee with Tulane in 2014

Lee redshirted as a freshman at Tulane in 2013. In 2014, he became the starter. On August 28, 2014, Lee recorded 262 yards and three touchdowns in his college debut against Tulsa. On September 13, he tossed three touchdowns and recorded 238 yards against Southeastern Louisiana. On November 8, he gained 237 yards and scored three times against Houston. Lee started all 10 of his games, throwing for 1,962 yards and 12 touchdowns which set Tulane freshman records.

=== 2015 season ===
On September 3, 2015, Lee recorded 246 yards and a touchdown in the season opener against Duke. On September 19, he recorded a season-high 277 yards and a touchdown against Maine. On October 3, Lee threw a career-high four touchdowns against UCF. On November 14, he recorded 252 yards and two touchdowns against Army. He started all 9 of his games in 2015, throwing for 1,639 yards, 11 touchdowns, and seven interceptions.

=== 2017 season ===
On January 30, 2016, Lee announced that he was transferring to the University of Nebraska-Lincoln. He sat out the 2016 season per NCAA transfer rules. On April 19, 2017, Lee was named the starting quarterback for the 2017 season. On September 2, 2017, Lee recorded 238 yards and two touchdowns in the season-opener against Arkansas State. The next week, he threw a season-high three touchdowns against Oregon. On September 16, Lee ran in two scores against Northern Illinois, the first time ever doing so in college. On September 29, he threw three touchdowns against Illinois. On October 14, Lee recorded 303 yards and two touchdowns against Ohio State. On November 28, he threw two touchdowns and gained a career-high 431 yards against Purdue. On November 18, Lee recorded 399 yards and three touchdowns against Penn State. Lee finished his 2017 season recording 3,143 yards, 23 touchdowns, 16 interceptions, two rushing scores, and compiling a 4–8 record as Nebraska's starter.

On December 28, 2017, Lee announced that he would enter the 2018 NFL draft.

=== College statistics ===
Season	Team	Games		Passing							Rushing				
Season	Team	GP	GS	Record	Cmp	Att	Pct	Yds	TD	Int	Rtg	Att	Yds	Avg	TD
2013	Tulane	0	0	—	Redshirt										
2014	Tulane	10	10	2–8	185	336	55.1	1,962	12	14	107.6	36	−125	−3.5	0
2015	Tulane	9	9	3–6	143	276	51.8	1,639	11	7	109.8	23	−162	−7.0	0
2016	Nebraska	0	0	—	Did not play										
2017	Nebraska	12	12	4–8	246	428	57.5	3,143	23	16	129.4	30	−97	−3.2	2
Career		31	31	10–23	574	1,040	55.2	6,744	46	37	117.1	89	−384	−4.3	2

== Professional career ==
Pre-draft measurables
Height	Weight	Arm length	Hand span	40-yard dash	20-yard shuttle	Three-cone drill	Vertical jump	Broad jump
6 ft 4 1/4 in (1.94 m)	218 lb (99 kg)	32 1/2 in (0.83 m)	10 1/2 in (0.27 m)	4.98 s	4.41 s	7.00 s	32.0 in (0.81 m)	9 ft 7 in (2.92 m)
All values from NFL Combine

Lee was selected by the Jacksonville Jaguars in the sixth round (203rd overall) of the 2018 NFL Draft. On May 10, he signed his rookie contract. He was waived on September 1, 2018 and was signed to the practice squad the next day. He was promoted to the active roster on December 28, 2018. On August 17, 2019, Lee was waived by the Jaguars.
