= Troy Apke =

American football player (born 1995)

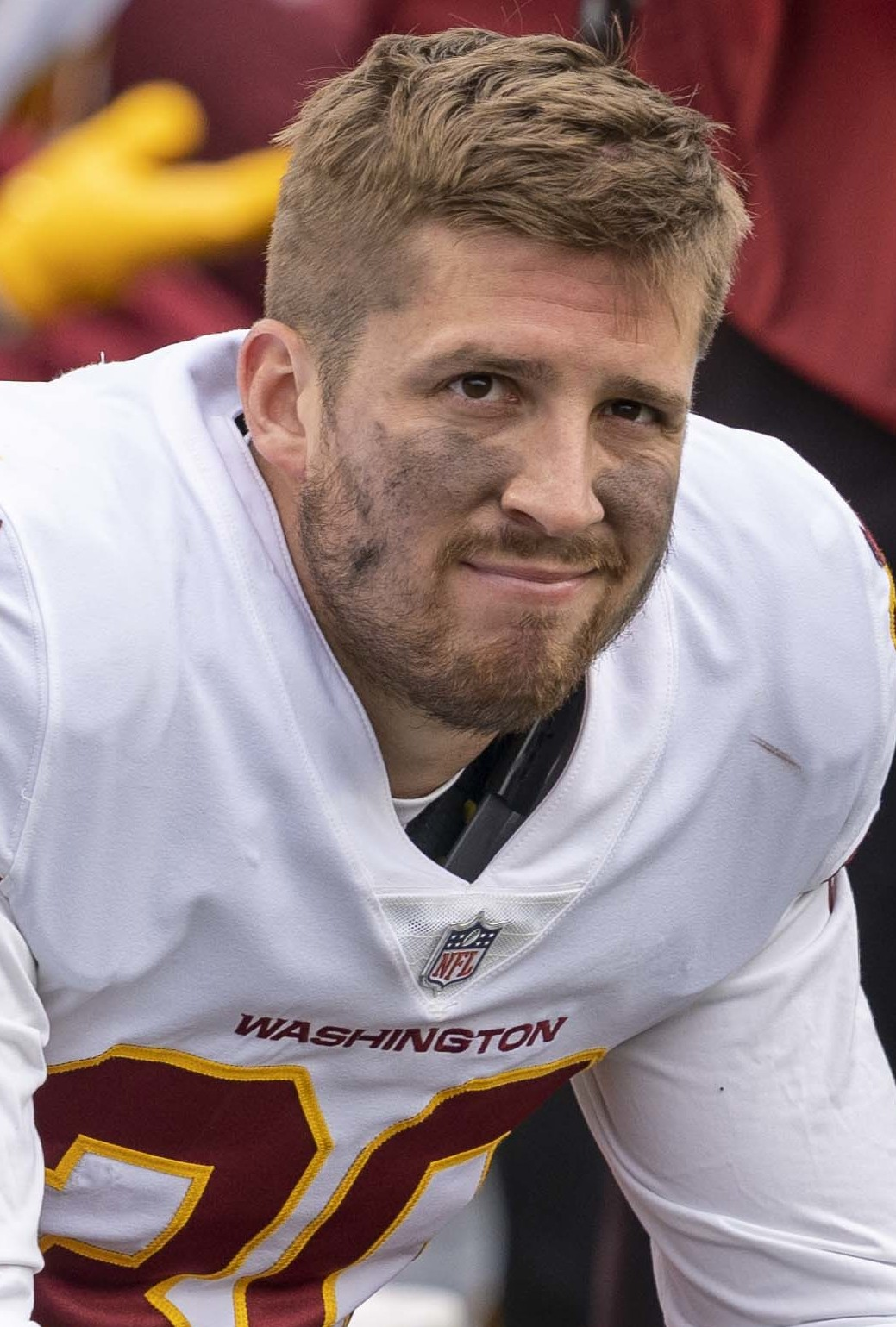
- Apke with the Washington Football Team in 2021

No. 30
- Positions: Safety, cornerback

Personal information
- Born: April 11, 1995 (age 31); Pittsburgh, Pennsylvania, U.S.
- Listed height: 6 ft 1 in (1.85 m)
- Listed weight: 205 lb (93 kg)

Career information
- High school: Mt. Lebanon (Mt. Lebanon, Pennsylvania)
- College: Penn State (2014–2017)
- NFL draft: 2018: 4th round, 109th overall pick

Career history
- Washington Redskins / Football Team / Commanders (2018–2023)

Awards and highlights
- NFLPA Collegiate Bowl MVP (2018)

Career NFL statistics
- Total tackles: 69
- Pass deflections: 4
- Interceptions: 1
- Fumble recoveries: 1
- Stats at Pro Football Reference

Troy Steven Apke (born April 11, 1995) is an American professional football safety and cornerback. He played college football for the Penn State Nittany Lions and was selected by the Washington Redskins in the fourth round of the 2018 NFL draft. He is the son of former Pittsburgh Steelers player Steve Apke.

== Early life ==
Apke was born in Pittsburgh, Pennsylvania to former Pittsburgh Panthers and Pittsburgh Steelers linebacker Steve Apke. His mother also ran track and field for Pittsburgh. He grew up in nearby Mt. Lebanon Township and attended Mt. Lebanon High School, where he participated in football, basketball, and track and field. Apke advanced to the PIAA state track and field championships his junior and senior years. He was also the WPIAL Champion in the 100 meters in 2014, recording a time of 10.81 seconds. He was a three-year starter for the football team playing wide receiver and safety. During his junior and senior seasons Apke had 1,776 receiving yards and 20 touchdowns and on defense, 68 tackles with 3 interceptions. A 3-star recruit, Apke committed to Penn State.

College recruiting
| Name | Hometown | School | Height | Weight | Commit date |
|---|---|---|---|---|---|
| Troy Apke; WR | Pittsburgh | Mt. Lebanon | 6 ft 2 in (1.88 m) | 180 lb (82 kg) | Apr 13, 2013 |
| Troy Apke; WR | Recruit ratings: Rivals: 247Sports: ESPN: (79) | | | | |
Overall recruit ranking:
Note: In many cases, Scout, Rivals, 247Sports, On3, and ESPN may conflict in their listings of height and weight.; In these cases, the average was taken. ESPN grades are on a 100-point scale.; Sources:

== College career ==
During his freshman season at Penn State, Apke played four games on special teams, totaling two tackles. In his sophomore year, he played in all 13 games, starting one. He finished the season with 26 total tackles, one forced fumble, and one pass deflection. During his junior season, Apke played in all 14 games starting one again. On October 1, he recorded a career high six tackles and one pass deflection in a win over Minnesota.

Prior to his senior season Apke was named a starter at safety by head coach James Franklin. In the season opener against Akron Zips, Apke had four tackles and was one of eight players to be a part of three-straight seasons with a shutout on the Nittany Lions roster. Also, he was one of three who played in all three of those games. Apke graduated with a degree in Criminology. Prior to playing in the 2017 Fiesta Bowl, he was one of twenty on the roster who graduated before the Bowl game.

Apke was selected to participate in the January 2018 edition of the NFLPA Collegiate Bowl, where he was named game MVP after a team-high seven tackles, a forced fumble and a 56-yard interception return for a touchdown.

=== College statistics ===
| Season | G | Tackles | | | | | Fumbles | | Interceptions | | | | |
| Season | G | Solo | Asst. | Tot. | Sacks | TFL | FF | FR | Int. | Yds. | Avg. | TD | Def. |
|---|---|---|---|---|---|---|---|---|---|---|---|---|---|
| 2014 | 4 | 2 | 0 | 2 | 0 | 0 | 0 | 0 | 0 | 0 | 0 | 0 | 0 |
| 2015 | 13 | 14 | 12 | 26 | 0 | 0 | 1 | 0 | 0 | 0 | 0 | 0 | 1 |
| 2016 | 14 | 11 | 17 | 28 | 0 | 1 | 0 | 1 | 1 | 10 | 10 | 0 | 1 |
| 2017 | 13 | 36 | 19 | 55 | 1 | 3 | 0 | 0 | 1 | 1 | 1 | 0 | 5 |
| Total | 44 | 63 | 48 | 111 | 1 | 3 | 1 | 1 | 2 | 11 | 5.5 | 0 | 7 |

== Professional career ==
Pre-draft measurables
| Height | Weight | Arm length | Hand span | Wingspan | 40-yard dash | 10-yard split | 20-yard split | 20-yard shuttle | Three-cone drill | Vertical jump | Broad jump | Bench press |
|---|---|---|---|---|---|---|---|---|---|---|---|---|
| 6 ft 1 1/4 in (1.86 m) | 200 lb (91 kg) | 32 3/8 in (0.82 m) | 8 3/8 in (0.21 m) | 6 ft 3 3/4 in (1.92 m) | 4.34 s | 1.52 s | 2.52 s | 4.03 s | 6.56 s | 41.0 in (1.04 m) | 10 ft 11 in (3.33 m) | 16 reps |
All values from NFL Combine

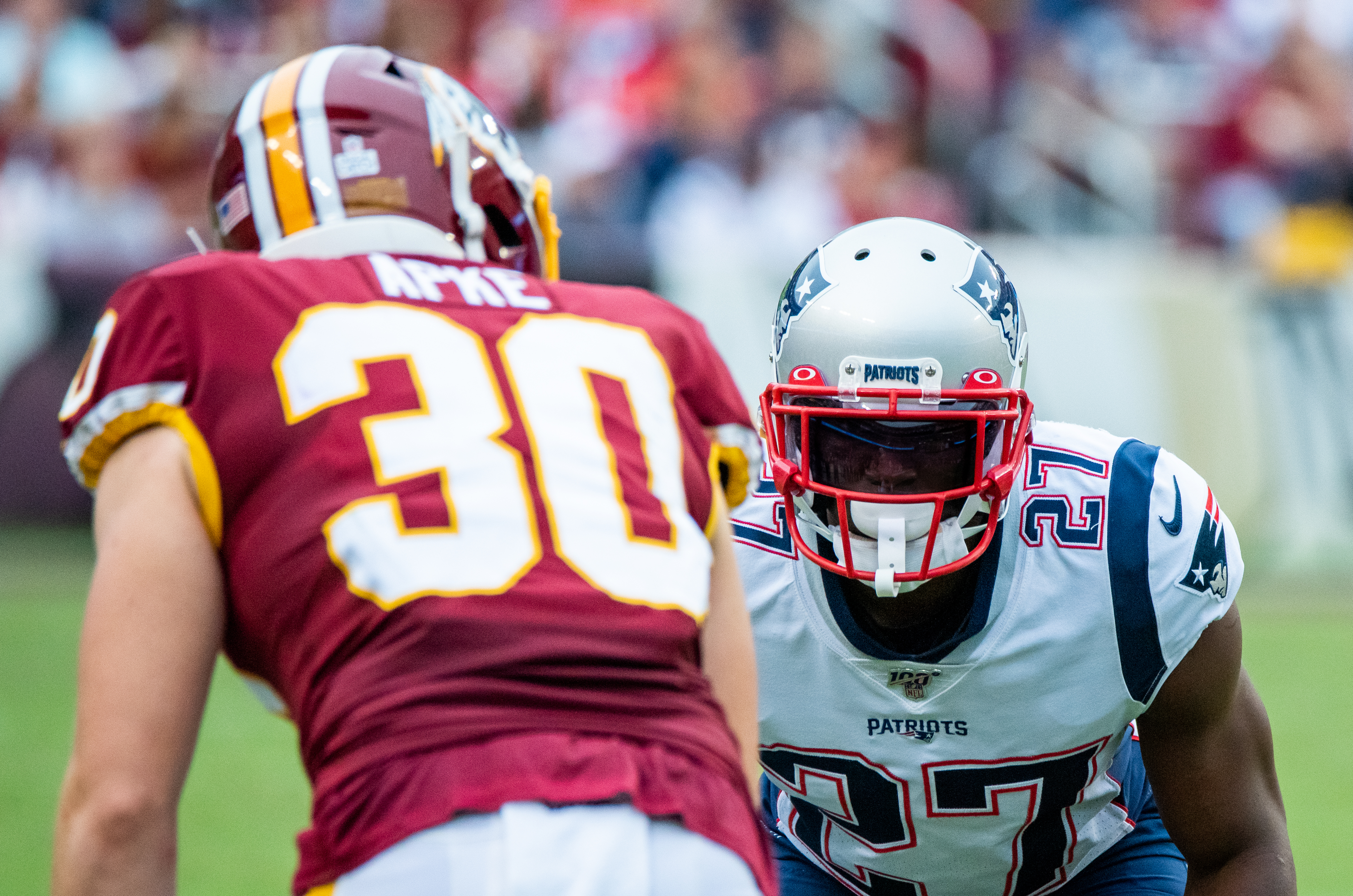
Apke in a game against the New England Patriots in 2019

Apke attended the NFL Combine, where he ran the 40-yard dash in 4.34 seconds. (“He can RUN, run” was Deion Sanders’ description conveying his surprise at how fast Apke ran the 40). In the 2018 NFL draft, he was selected by the Washington Redskins in the fourth round, 109th overall. Apke made his NFL debut in the Redskins season opener against the Arizona Cardinals, where he made a touchdown-saving tackle on a punt return, but was injured on the play. He was subsequently placed on injured reserve a month later.

Coming into the 2019 season Apke was expected to be a contributor on special teams. Through the first six weeks Apke had three tackles. In week 7 versus the San Francisco 49ers, Apke saw significant action on defense after an injury to starting safety Montae Nicholson. Apke had an interception, the first of his career, as well as a pass deflection and 6 tackles in just under a half of action in a 9–0 loss.

In 2020, Apke was named the starting free safety after beating out Sean Davis during training camp. Due to poor performance to start the season, he lost his starting position after Week 5. He converted to cornerback in 2021, making him the first white NFL player at the position since Dustin Fox in 2008.

Apke re-signed with the team on March 17, 2022. He was released on August 16, 2022, but re-signed to their practice squad on August 31. He was released again on October 5, 2022, but re-signed back to the practice squad on October 21. Apke was released again on November 26, 2022. On December 30, he was re-signed to the practice squad. He signed a reserve/future contract on January 9, 2023. The Commanders placed Apke on injured reserve on August 8, 2023. He was released on November 20.
