= 2018 Penn State Nittany Lions football team =

American college football season

2018 Penn State Nittany Lions football

Citrus Bowl, L 24–27 vs. Kentucky
- Conference: Big Ten Conference
- East Division

Ranking
- Coaches: No. 17
- AP: No. 17
- Record: 9–4 (6–3 Big Ten)
- Head coach: James Franklin (5th season)
- Offensive coordinator: Ricky Rahne (1st season)
- Offensive scheme: Spread
- Defensive coordinator: Brent Pry (3rd season)
- Co-defensive coordinator: Tim Banks (3rd season)
- Base defense: 4–3
- Captains: Trace McSorley; Blake Gillikin; Nick Scott
- Home stadium: Beaver Stadium

2018 Big Ten Conference football standings
	Conf.			Overall
Team	W		L	W		L
East Division
No. 3 Ohio State xy$	8	–	1	13	–	1
No. 14 Michigan x	8	–	1	10	–	3
No. 17 Penn State	6	–	3	9	–	4
Michigan State	5	–	4	7	–	6
Maryland	3	–	6	5	–	7
Indiana	2	–	7	5	–	7
Rutgers	0	–	9	1	–	11
West Division
No. 21 Northwestern xy	8	–	1	9	–	5
Wisconsin	5	–	4	8	–	5
No. 25 Iowa	5	–	4	9	–	4
Purdue	5	–	4	6	–	7
Minnesota	3	–	6	7	–	6
Nebraska	3	–	6	4	–	8
Illinois	2	–	7	4	–	8
Championship: Ohio State 45, Northwestern 24
$ – Conference champion; x – Division champion/co-champions; y – Championship game participant; Rankings from AP Poll

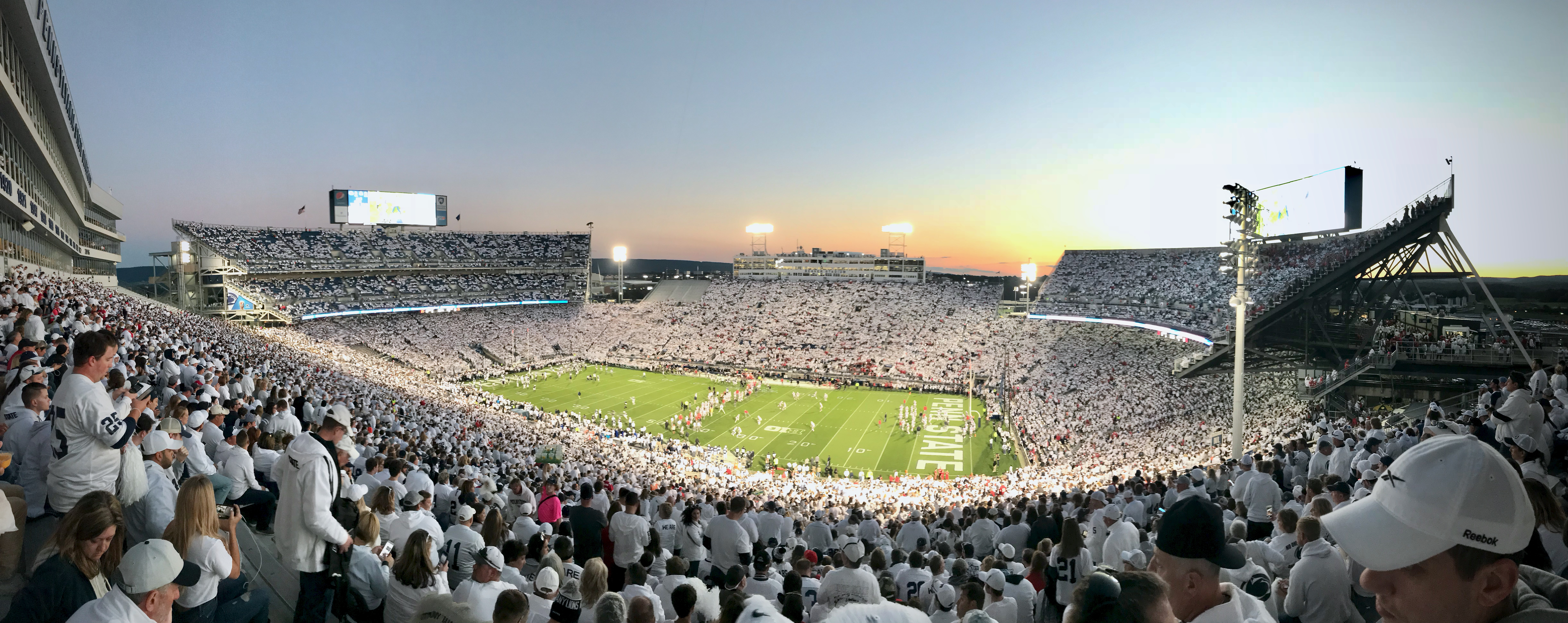
Beaver Stadium fills up during pregame warmups prior to the annual game vs Ohio State in 2018.

The 2018 Penn State Nittany Lions football team represented Pennsylvania State University in the 2018 NCAA Division I FBS football season. The team was led by fifth-year head coach James Franklin and played its home games in Beaver Stadium in University Park, Pennsylvania. They were a member of the East Division of the Big Ten Conference.

Penn State, coming off an 11–2, Fiesta Bowl-winning season in 2017, began the year at 10th in the preseason AP Poll. They narrowly escaped an upset in their first game of the year by defeating Appalachian State in overtime. The Nittany Lions won their first four games and entered an anticipated home game against No. 4 Ohio State at No. 9, but lost to the Buckeyes by a score of 26–27. The following week the team was upset by Michigan State on homecoming. The team rebounded with a home win against then-No. 18 Iowa, but was blown out the following week by Michigan 42–7. The Nittany Lions finished the regular season in third in the Big Ten East with a conference record of 6–3. They were invited to the Citrus Bowl, where they lost to Kentucky to finish the year at 9–4.

Senior quarterback Trace McSorley led the team in passing, finishing with 2,530 passing yards and 18 passing touchdowns to go along with 12 rushing touchdowns. He was named second team All-Big Ten by both the media and coaches. During the season, McSorley became the all-time school record holder in several categories, including career passing yards, completions, passing touchdowns, and total touchdowns responsible for. Junior running back Miles Sanders finished in second in the conference in rushing with 1,274 yards. On defense, cornerback Amani Oruwariye and lineman Yetur Gross-Matos were named first-team all-conference by the media.

== Offseason ==
=== Staff changes ===
On November 29, 2017, it was announced that offensive coordinator and quarterbacks coach Joe Moorhead was hired to be the head coach for the Mississippi State Bulldogs. Shortly after, it was reported that running backs coach and special teams coordinator Charles Huff would be joining Moorhead at Mississippi State as his assistant head coach, run game coordinator, and running backs coach. On December 1, 2017, James Franklin announced that tight ends coach Ricky Rahne would replace Moorhead as offensive coordinator and quarterbacks coach. It was also announced that former Maryland offensive line coach Tyler Bowen was hired to coach tight ends and consultant Phil Galiano was hired to coordinate special teams and assist with the defensive line. On January 12, 2018, former Army wide receivers coach David Corley Jr. was hired to the staff as the running backs coach. Corley was hired as the 10th assistant coach because of a new rule change by the NCAA, that expanded staff sizes by one. On January 24, 2018, wide receivers coach Josh Gattis announced that he would be leaving to serve as the co-offensive coordinator and wide receivers coach for the Alabama Crimson Tide. The next day it was announced that former Florida Gators running backs coach Ja'Juan Seider would be joining Penn State in the same capacity and David Corley Jr. would be coaching the wide receivers. It was also announced that defensive line coach Sean Spencer received the title of associate head coach, a title previously held by defensive coordinator Brent Pry.

=== Recruiting ===
The Nittany Lions signed 23 recruits.

College recruiting (2018)
Name	Hometown	School	Height	Weight	Commit date
Justin Shorter; WR	Monmouth Junction, NJ	South Brunswick High School	6 ft 4 in (1.93 m)	213 lb (97 kg)	Aug 6, 2016
Justin Shorter; WR	Recruit ratings: Scout: Rivals: 247Sports: ESPN:				
Pat Freiermuth; TE	North Andover, MA	Brooks School	6 ft 5 in (1.96 m)	250 lb (110 kg)	Aug 16, 2016
Pat Freiermuth; TE	Recruit ratings: Scout: Rivals: 247Sports: ESPN:				
Zack Kuntz; TE	Camp Hill, PA	Camp Hill High School	6 ft 7 in (2.01 m)	221 lb (100 kg)	Nov 26, 2016
Zack Kuntz; TE	Recruit ratings: Scout: Rivals: 247Sports: ESPN:				
Isaiah Humphries; S	Sachse, TX	Sachse High School	5 ft 11 in (1.80 m)	191 lb (87 kg)	Dec 31, 2016
Isaiah Humphries; S	Recruit ratings: Scout: Rivals: 247Sports: ESPN:				
Charlie Katshir; LB	Mechanicsburg, PA	Cumberland Valley High School	6 ft 3 in (1.91 m)	210 lb (95 kg)	Feb 2, 2017
Charlie Katshir; LB	Recruit ratings: Scout: Rivals: 247Sports: ESPN:				
Ricky Slade; RB	Woodbridge, VA	C. D. Hylton High School	5 ft 9 in (1.75 m)	185 lb (84 kg)	Feb 3, 2017
Ricky Slade; RB	Recruit ratings: Scout: Rivals: 247Sports: ESPN:				
Jesse Luketa; LB	Erie, PA	Mercyhurst Preparatory School	6 ft 3 in (1.91 m)	238 lb (108 kg)	Feb 3, 2017
Jesse Luketa; LB	Recruit ratings: Scout: Rivals: 247Sports: ESPN:				
Nick Tarburton; LB	Perkasie, PA	Pennridge High School	6 ft 4 in (1.93 m)	242 lb (110 kg)	Feb 9, 2017
Nick Tarburton; LB	Recruit ratings: Scout: Rivals: 247Sports: ESPN:				
Trent Gordon; CB	Manvel, TX	Manvel High School	5 ft 11 in (1.80 m)	180 lb (82 kg)	Mar 29, 2017
Trent Gordon; CB	Recruit ratings: Scout: Rivals: 247Sports: ESPN:				
Nana Asiedu; OT	Stafford, VA	North Stafford High School	6 ft 5 in (1.96 m)	265 lb (120 kg)	Apr 22, 2017
Nana Asiedu; OT	Recruit ratings: Scout: Rivals: 247Sports: ESPN:				
Bryce Effner; OT	Aurora, IL	Metea Valley High School	6 ft 5 in (1.96 m)	285 lb (129 kg)	May 6, 2017
Bryce Effner; OT	Recruit ratings: Scout: Rivals: 247Sports: ESPN:				
Jordan Miner; CB	Wesley Chapel, FL	Wiregrass Ranch High School	6 ft 1 in (1.85 m)	183 lb (83 kg)	Jul 6, 2017
Jordan Miner; CB	Recruit ratings: Scout: Rivals: 247Sports: ESPN:				
Judge Culpepper; DE	Tampa, FL	Plant High School	6 ft 5 in (1.96 m)	256 lb (116 kg)	Jul 14, 2017
Judge Culpepper; DE	Recruit ratings: Scout: Rivals: 247Sports: ESPN:				
Will Levis; QB	Middletown, CT	Xavier High School	6 ft 4 in (1.93 m)	222 lb (101 kg)	Jul 15, 2017
Will Levis; QB	Recruit ratings: Scout: Rivals: 247Sports: ESPN:				
Jake Pinegar; K	Ankeny, IA	Centennial High School	6 ft 2 in (1.88 m)	195 lb (88 kg)	Jul 16, 2017
Jake Pinegar; K	Recruit ratings: Scout: Rivals: 247Sports: ESPN:				
Daniel George; WR	Oxon Hill, MD	Oxon Hill High School	6 ft 2 in (1.88 m)	205 lb (93 kg)	Jul 16, 2017
Daniel George; WR	Recruit ratings: Scout: Rivals: 247Sports: ESPN:				
Juice Scruggs; C	Erie, PA	Cathedral Preparatory School	6 ft 3 in (1.91 m)	270 lb (120 kg)	Aug 4, 2017
Juice Scruggs; C	Recruit ratings: Scout: Rivals: 247Sports: ESPN:				
P. J. Mustipher; DT	Owings Mills, MD	McDonogh School	6 ft 4 in (1.93 m)	300 lb (140 kg)	Aug 7, 2017
P. J. Mustipher; DT	Recruit ratings: Scout: Rivals: 247Sports: ESPN:				
Aeneas Hawkins; DT	Cincinnati, OH	Moeller High School	6 ft 3 in (1.91 m)	265 lb (120 kg)	Aug 10, 2017
Aeneas Hawkins; DT	Recruit ratings: Scout: Rivals: 247Sports: ESPN:				
Jahan Dotson; WR	Nazareth, PA	Nazareth Area High School	5 ft 11 in (1.80 m)	165 lb (75 kg)	Dec 20, 2017
Jahan Dotson; WR	Recruit ratings: Scout: Rivals: 247Sports: ESPN:				
Micah Parsons; DE	Harrisburg, PA	Harrisburg High School	6 ft 3 in (1.91 m)	235 lb (107 kg)	Dec 20, 2017
Micah Parsons; DE	Recruit ratings: Scout: Rivals: 247Sports: ESPN:				
Odafe Oweh; DE	Blairstown, NJ	Blair Academy	6 ft 5 in (1.96 m)	236 lb (107 kg)	Jan 4, 2018
Odafe Oweh; DE	Recruit ratings: Scout: Rivals: 247Sports: ESPN:				
Rasheed Walker; OT	Waldorf, Maryland	North Point High School	6 ft 6 in (1.98 m)	290 lb (130 kg)	Feb 7, 2018
Rasheed Walker; OT	Recruit ratings: Scout: Rivals: 247Sports: ESPN:				
Overall recruit ranking:
Note: In many cases, Scout, Rivals, 247Sports, On3, and ESPN may conflict in their listings of height and weight.; In these cases, the average was taken. ESPN grades are on a 100-point scale.; Sources: "Penn State Football Commitments". Rivals.; "2018 Team Ranking". Rivals.com.

=== 2018 NFL draft ===
Player	Position	Round	Pick	Team
Saquon Barkley	Running back	1	2	New York Giants
Mike Gesicki	Tight end	2	42	Miami Dolphins
Troy Apke	Safety	4	109	Washington Redskins
DaeSean Hamilton	Wide receiver	4	113	Denver Broncos
Marcus Allen	Safety	5	148	Pittsburgh Steelers
Christian Campbell	Cornerback	6	182	Arizona Cardinals
Jason Cabinda	Linebacker	UFA		Oakland Raiders
Saeed Blacknall	Wide receiver	UFA		Oakland Raiders
Grant Haley	Cornerback	UFA		New York Giants
Brendan Mahon	Guard	UFA		Carolina Panthers
Curtis Cothran	Defensive tackle	UFA		Minnesota Vikings
Parker Cothren	Defensive lineman	UFA		Pittsburgh Steelers
Tyler Davis	Kicker	UFA		Buffalo Bills

=== Offseason departures ===
Player	Class	Position	Hometown	Reason left
DaeSean Hamilton	Sr	WR	Stafford, Virginia	Graduated
Marcus Allen	Sr	S	Upper Marlboro, Maryland	Graduated
Saeed Blacknall	Sr	WR	Manalapan, New Jersey	Graduated
Christian Campbell	Sr	CB	Phenix City, Alabama	Graduated
Mike Gesicki	Sr	TE	Manahawkin, New Jersey	Graduated
Grant Haley	Sr	CB	Atlanta, Georgia	Graduated
Troy Apke	Sr	S	Mt. Lebanon, Pennsylvania	Graduated
Jason Cabinda	Sr	LB	Buena Park, California	Graduated
Curtis Cothran	Sr	DT	Newtown, Pennsylvania	Graduated
Parker Cothren	Sr	DT	Huntsville, Alabama	Graduated
Tyler Davis	Sr	K	St. Charles, Illinois	Graduated
Brendan Mahon	Sr	G	Randolph, New Jersey	Graduated
Saquon Barkley	Jr	RB	Whitehall, Pennsylvania	Declared for NFL draft
Crae McCracken	Fr	OL	Williamsport, Pennsylvania	Transferred
Andre Robinson	So	RB	Mechanicsburg, Pennsylvania	Transferred
Alex Barbir	Fr	K	Cumming, Georgia	Transferred
Corey Bolds	Fr	DT	Paterson, New Jersey	Transferred
Manny Bowen	Jr	LB	Barnegat, New Jersey	Dismissed from program
Irvin Charles	So	WR	Sicklerville, New Jersey	Dismissed from program
Robert Martin	So	OL	Sparta, New Jersey	Retired

=== Returning starters ===
Offense

Player	Class	Position
Trace McSorley	Senior	Quarterback
Juwan Johnson	Junior	Wide receiver
Ryan Bates	Junior	Offensive tackle
Connor McGovern	Junior	Center/Guard
Steven Gonzalez	Junior	Guard
Will Fries	Sophomore	Offensive tackle
DeAndre Thompkins	Senior	Wide receiver
Chasz Wright	Senior	Offensive tackle
Miles Sanders	Junior	Running back

Defense

Player	Class	Position
Kevin Givens	Junior	Defensive tackle
Shareef Miller	Junior	Defensive end
Koa Farmer	Senior	Linebacker
Nick Scott	Senior	Safety

Special teams

Player	Class	Position
Blake Gillikin	Junior	Punter
Kyle Vasey	Senior	Long snapper
DeAndre Thompkins	Senior	Punt returner

=== Position key ===
Back	B	Center	C	Cornerback	CB	Defensive back	DB
Defensive end	DE	Defensive lineman	DL	Defensive tackle	DT	End	E
Fullback	FB	Guard	G	Halfback	HB	Kicker	K
Kickoff returner	KR	Offensive tackle	OT	Offensive lineman	OL	Linebacker	LB
Long snapper	LS	Punter	P	Punt returner	PR	Quarterback	QB
Running back	RB	Safety	S	Tight end	TE	Wide receiver	WR

== Preseason ==
=== Award watch lists ===
Award	Player	Position	Year
Rimington Trophy	Connor McGovern	C	JR
Chuck Bednarik Award	Shareef Miller	DE	JR
Maxwell Award	Trace McSorley	QB	SR
Davey O'Brien Award	Trace McSorley	QB	SR
Doak Walker Award	Miles Sanders	RB	JR
John Mackey Award	Jonathan Holland	TE	JR
Butkus Award	Koa Farmer	LB	SR
Bronko Nagurski Trophy	Amani Oruwariye	CB	SR
Outland Trophy	Ryan Bates	OL	SR
Outland Trophy	Connor McGovern	C	JR
Ray Guy Award	Blake Gillikin	P/K	JR
Wuerffel Trophy	Trace McSorley	QB	SR
Walter Camp Award	Trace McSorley	QB	SR
Ted Hendricks Award	Shareef Miller	DE	JR
Johnny Unitas Golden Arm Award	Trace McSorley	QB	SR
Manning Award	Trace McSorley	QB	SR

== Personnel ==
=== Roster ===
Seniors Trace McSorley and Nick Scott, and junior Blake Gillikin were elected by their teammates as captains. Running Back C. J. Holmes is a transfer from Notre Dame. On August 4, 2018, Linebacker Manny Bowen returned to the program after being dismissed near the end of the 2017 season.

2018 Penn State Nittany Lions football team roster
Players
Coaches
Offense

Pos.	#	Name	Class
WR	1	K. J. Hamler	Fr
QB	2	Tommy Stevens	Jr
WR	3	DeAndre Thompkins	Sr
RB	4	Ricky Slade	Fr
WR	5	Jahan Dotson	Fr
WR	6	Justin Shorter	Fr
QB	7	Jake Zembiec (injured)	So
RB	8	Mark Allen	Sr
QB	9	Trace McSorley (C)	Sr
WR	10	Brandon Polk	Jr
WR	12	Mac Hippenhammer	Fr
QB	13	Grayson Kline	Fr
QB	14	Sean Clifford	Fr
QB	15	Michael Shuster	So
QB	17	Will Levis	Fr
TE	18	Jonathan Holland	Jr
RB	20	Johnathan Thomas	Sr
RB	24	Miles Sanders	Jr
WR	29	Henry Fessler	Fr
RB	32	Journey Brown	Fr
RB	33	C. J. Holmes	So
RB	40	Nick Eury	So
TE	41	Joe Arcangelo	Jr
OL	50	Will Knutsson	Fr
OL	51	Alex Gellerstedt	So
OL	52	Ryan Bates	Jr
OL	53	Rasheed Walker	Fr
OL	54	Nana Asiedu (injured)	Fr
OL	62	Michal Menet	So
OL	63	Collin DeBoef	Fr
OL	64	Zach Simpson	Jr
OL	66	Connor McGovern	Jr
OL	68	Hunter Kelly	So
OL	69	C. J. Thorpe	Fr
OL	70	Juice Scruggs	Fr
OL	71	Will Fries	So
OL	72	Bryce Effner	Fr
OL	73	Mike Miranda	Fr
OL	74	Steven Gonzalez	Jr
OL	75	Des Holmes	Fr
OL	76	Sterling Jenkins	Jr
OL	77	Chasz Wright	Sr
OL	79	Charlie Shuman	Sr
WR	80	Justin Weller	Fr
TE	80	Danny Dalton	So
WR	81	Cam Sullivan-Brown	Fr
TE	82	Zack Kuntz	Fr
WR	82	Tyler Shoop	Jr
TE	83	Nick Bowers	Jr
WR	83	Alex Hoenstine	Fr
WR	84	Juwan Johnson	Jr
WR	85	Isaac Lutz	So
WR	86	Daniel George	Fr
TE	87	Pat Freiermuth	Fr
WR	88	Dan Chisena	Jr
WR	89	Brandon Clark	Fr
WR	89	Colton Maxwell	So

Defense

Pos.	#	Name	Class
S	2	Isaiah Humphries	Fr
CB	2	Donovan Johnson	Fr
S	4	Nick Scott (C)	Sr
CB	5	Tariq Castro-Fields	So
LB	6	Cam Brown	Jr
LB	7	Koa Farmer	Sr
CB	8	Jordan Miner (injured)	Fr
LB	9	Jarvis Miller	Jr
LB	11	Micah Parsons	Fr
LB	13	Ellis Brooks	Fr
CB	14	Zech McPhearson	So
S	16	John Petrishen	Jr
S	17	Garrett Taylor	Jr
DE	18	Shaka Toney	So
DE	19	Torrence Brown (injured)	Sr
CB	19	Trent Gordon	Fr
CB	20	Jabari Butler	Jr
CB	21	Amani Oruwariye	Sr
S	23	Ayron Monroe	Jr
CB	24	D. J. Brown	Fr
LB	25	Brelin Faison-Walden	Fr
S	26	Jonathan Sutherland	Fr
DT	27	Aeneas Hawkins	Fr
S	27	Cody Romano	Fr
DE	28	Odafe Oweh	Fr
CB	29	John Reid	Jr
DT	30	Kevin Givens	Jr
CB	31	Christopher Welde	Jr
LB	33	Jake Cooper	Sr
DE	34	Shane Simmons	So
S	35	Justin Neff	Fr
LB	36	Jan Johnson	Jr
S	37	Drew Hartlaub	Fr
S	38	Lamont Wade	So
LB	39	Frank Di Leo	Jr
LB	40	Jesse Luketa	Fr
LB	41	Dae'Lun Darien	So
DT	42	Ellison Jordan	So
LB	43	Manny Bowen	Sr
DE	45	Joe DuMond	So
LB	45	Charlie Katshir	Fr
DE	46	Nick Tarburton	Fr
LB	47	Will Blair	So
DE	48	Shareef Miller	Jr
DE	49	Daniel Joseph	So
LB	50	Max Chizmar	Fr
LB	51	Jason Vranic	Sr
DT	53	Fred Hansard	Fr
DT	54	Robert Windsor	Jr
DT	55	Antonio Shelton	So
DT	58	Evan Presta	Fr
DT	88	Judge Culpepper	Fr
DT	90	Damion Barber	Fr
DT	93	P. J. Mustipher	Fr
DE	95	Donnell Dix	Sr
DT	96	Immanuel Iyke	Jr
DE	97	Ryan Buchholz (injured)	Jr
DE	99	Yetur Gross-Matos	So

Special teams

Pos.	#	Name	Class
P	49	Cade Pollard	Fr
K	90	Rafael Checa	Fr
LS	91	Chris Stoll	Fr
K	92	Jake Pinegar	Fr
P, K	93	Blake Gillikin (C)	Jr
LS	94	Joe Calcagno	Fr
K	95	Vlad Hilling	Fr
LS	96	Matt Aloni	Fr
LS	96	Kyle Vasey	Sr
K, P	97	Carson Landis	Fr
LS	98	Kevin Cahill	Fr
LS	98	Mike Curry	Jr
LS	98	Dan Vasey	Fr
K	99	Justin Tobin	So

Head coach

- James Franklin

Coordinators/assistant coaches

- Brent Pry (defensive coordinator/linebackers)
- Ricky Rahne (offensive coordinator/quarterbacks)
- Ja'Juan Seider (running backs)
- Phil Galiano (special teams coordinator/assistant defensive line)
- Tim Banks (safeties/co-defensive coordinator)
- David Corley Jr. (wide receivers coach)
- Matt Limegrover (offensive line/run game coordinator)
- Tyler Bowen (tight ends/offensive recruiting coordinator)
- Terry Smith (cornerbacks/defensive recruiting coordinator/assistant head coach)
- Sean Spencer (defensive line/run game coordinator/associate head coach)
- Dwight Galt (assistant athletics director for performance enhancement)
- Sean Cascarano (graduate assistant)
- Mark Dupuis (graduate assistant)
- Matt Fleischacker (graduate assistant)
- Kevin Smith (graduate assistant)

Legend

- (C) Team captain
- (S) Suspended
- (I) Ineligible
- Injured
- Redshirt

Roster

=== Depth chart ===
As of August 28, 2018

Defense

FS
4 Nick Scott
23 Ayron Monroe
16 John Petrishen

WLB	MLB	SLB
7 Koa Farmer	36 Jan Johnson	6 Cam Brown
11 Micah Parsons	13 Ellis Brooks	9 Jarvis Miller
33 Jake Cooper	40 Jesse Luketa	41 Dae'Lun Darien

SS
17 Garrett Taylor
38 Lamont Wade
26 Jonathan Sutherland

CB
21 Amani Oruwariye
2 Donovan Johnson
14 Zech McPhearson

DE	DT	DT	DE
99 Yetur Gross-Matos	30 Kevin Givens	54 Robert Windsor	48 Shareef Miller
18 Shaka Toney	53 Fred Hansard	55 Antonio Shelton	49 Daniel Joseph
28 Odafe Oweh	42 Ellison Jordan	93 P. J. Mustipher	46 Nick Tarburton

CB
29 John Reid
5 Tariq Castro-Fields
19 Trent Gordon

Offense

WR
84 Juwan Johnson
81 Cam Sullivan-Brown
86 Daniel George

WR
1 K. J. Hamler
12 Mac Hippenhammer
5 Jahan Dotson

LT	LG	C	RG	RT
52 Ryan Bates	74 Steven Gonzalez	62 Michal Menet	66 Connor McGovern	77 Chasz Wright OR
75 Des Holmes	73 Mike Miranda	64 Zach Simpson	69 C.J. Thorpe	71 Will Fries
53 Rasheed Walker	72 Bryce Effner	70 Juice Scruggs	79 Charlie Shuman	51 Alex Gellerstedt

TE
18 Jonathan Holland
OR 80 Danny Dalton
83 Nick Bowers
87 Pat Freiermuth

WR
3 DeAndre Thompkins
10 Brandon Polk
85 Isaac Lutz

QB
9 Trace McSorley
2 Tommy Stevens
14 Sean Clifford

Special teams
PK 92 Jake Pinegar
PK 90 Rafael Checa
P 93 Blake Gillikin
P 49 Cade Pollard
KR 1 K. J. Hamler
32 Journey Brown
PR 3 DeAndre Thompkins
1 K. J. Hamler
LS 96 Kyle Vasey
H 93 Blake Gillikin

RB
24 Miles Sanders
8 Mark Allen
4 Ricky Slade

=== Coaching staff ===
Position	Name	Alma mater
Head coach	James Franklin	East Stroudsburg (1994)
Defensive coordinator/linebackers	Brent Pry	Buffalo (1993)
Offensive coordinator/ quarterbacks	Ricky Rahne	Cornell (2002)
Tight ends/ Offensive Recruiting Coordinator	Tyler Bowen	Maryland (2010)
Safeties/co-Defensive coordinator	Tim Banks	Central Michigan University (1994)
Defensive line/Run Game Coordinator/Associate Head coach	Sean Spencer	Clarion (1995)
Offensive line	Matt Limegrover	University of Chicago (1990)
Cornerbacks/Defensive Recruiting Coordinator	Terry Smith	Penn State (1991)
Running backs	Ja'Juan Seider	West Virginia University (2000)
Wide receivers	David Corley	College of William & Mary (2002)
Special teams coordinator/assistant defensive line	Phil Galiano	Shippensburg University (1999)
Strength and conditioning	Dwight Galt	Maryland (1981)
Graduate Assistant	Sean Cascarano	University of Virginia (2013)
Graduate Assistant	Mark Dupuis	University of Connecticut (2011)
Graduate Assistant	Matt Fleischacker	Penn State (2016)
Graduate Assistant	Kevin Smith	Urbana University (2014)

== Schedule ==
=== Spring game ===
Date	Time	Spring Game	Site	TV	Result	Attendance
April 21	3:00 p.m.	Blue vs. White	Beaver Stadium • University Park, PA	BTN	Blue 21–10	71,000

=== Regular season ===
The team hosted two of the three non-conference games against the Appalachian State Mountaineers (first ever meeting) from the Sun Belt Conference and the Kent State Golden Flashes from the Mid-American Conference (MAC). They traveled to the Pittsburgh Panthers from the Atlantic Coast Conference (ACC).

During the 2018 Nittany Lions season, Penn State faced Big Ten conference opponents Illinois, Ohio State, Michigan State, Indiana, Iowa, Michigan, Wisconsin, Rutgers and Maryland. Their annual homecoming game was played on October 13. The 2018 regular season schedule consisted of 7 home games and 5 away.

Date	Time	Opponent	Rank	Site	TV	Result	Attendance
September 1	3:30 p.m.	Appalachian State*	No. 10	Beaver Stadium; University Park, PA	BTN	W 45–38 ^{OT}	105,232
September 8	8:00 p.m.	at Pittsburgh*	No. 13	Heinz Field; Pittsburgh, PA (rivalry)	ABC	W 51–6	68,400
September 15	12:00 p.m.	Kent State*	No. 11	Beaver Stadium; University Park, PA	FS1	W 63–10	106,528
September 21	9:00 p.m.	at Illinois	No. 10	Memorial Stadium; Champaign, IL	FS1	W 63–24	34,704
September 29	7:30 p.m.	No. 4 Ohio State	No. 9	Beaver Stadium; University Park, PA (rivalry, College GameDay)	ABC	L 26–27	110,889
October 13	3:30 p.m.	Michigan State^{†}	No. 8	Beaver Stadium; University Park, PA (rivalry)	BTN	L 17–21	106,685
October 20	3:30 p.m.	at Indiana	No. 18	Memorial Stadium; Bloomington, IN	ABC	W 33–28	41,553
October 27	3:30 p.m.	No. 18 Iowa	No. 17	Beaver Stadium; University Park, PA	ESPN	W 30–24	105,244
November 3	3:45 p.m.	at No. 5 Michigan	No. 14	Michigan Stadium; Ann Arbor, MI (rivalry)	ESPN	L 7–42	111,747
November 10	12:00 p.m.	Wisconsin	No. 20	Beaver Stadium; University Park, PA	ABC	W 22–10	105,396
November 17	12:00 p.m.	at Rutgers	No. 14	HighPoint.com Stadium; Piscataway, NJ	BTN	W 20–7	44,840
November 24	3:30 p.m.	Maryland	No. 12	Beaver Stadium; University Park, PA (rivalry)	ABC	W 38–3	98,422
January 1, 2019	1:00 p.m.	vs. No. 14 Kentucky*	No. 12	Camping World Stadium; Orlando, FL (Citrus Bowl, SEC Nation)	ABC	L 24–27	59,167
*Non-conference game; ^{†}Homecoming; Rankings from AP Poll and CFP Rankings after October 30 released prior to game; All times are in Eastern time

== Game summaries ==
=== Appalachian State ===
Appalachian State at Penn State – Game summary

Quarter	1	2	3	4	OT	Total
Appalachian State	10	0	0	28	0	38
No. 10 Penn State	7	3	14	14	7	45

at Beaver Stadium, University Park, Pennsylvania

- Date: September 1
- Game time: 3:30 p.m. EDT
- Game weather: 76 °F (24 °C); cloudy, humid
- Game attendance: 105,232
- Referee: Mark Kluczynski
- TV announcers (BTN): Kevin Kugler, Matt Millen, Lisa Byington
- ESPN Box Score GoPSUsports.com Box Score

Game information

First quarter

- PSU – Trace McSorley, 12-yard TD run, Jake Pinegar kick good, 12:02 (PSU 7–0)
- ASU – Darrynton Evans, 100-yard kickoff return, Chandler Staton kick good, 11:48 (TIE 7–7)
- ASU – Staton, 38-yard field goal, 4:10 (ASU 10–7)

Second quarter

- PSU – Pinegar, 32-yard field goal, 0:12 (TIE 10–10)

Third quarter

- PSU – McSorley, 10-yard TD run, Pinegar kick good, 9:41 (PSU 17–10)
- PSU – Ricky Slade, 27-yard TD run, Pinegar kick good, 2:41 (PSU 24–10)

Fourth quarter

- ASU – Malik Williams, 17-yard TD pass from Zac Thomas, Staton kick good, 13:39 (PSU 24–17)
- PSU – Miles Sanders, 2-yard TD run, Pinegar kick good, 11:17 (PSU 31–17)
- ASU – Williams, 24-yard TD pass from Thomas, Staton kick good, 7:40 (PSU 31–24)
- ASU – Thomas, 1-yard TD run, Staton kick good, 6:03 (TIE 31–31)
- ASU – Jalin Moore, 16-yard TD run, Staton kick good, 1:47 (ASU 38–31)
- PSU – K. J. Hamler, 15-yard TD pass from McSorley, Pinegar kick good, 0:42 (TIE 38–38)

Overtime

- PSU – Sanders, 4-yard TD run, Pinegar kick good, (PSU 45–38)

Top passers

- ASU – Zac Thomas – 25/38, 270 yards, 2 TD, INT
- PSU – Trace McSorley – 21/36, 230 yards, TD

Top rushers

- ASU – Jalin Moore – 18 carries, 88 yards, TD
- PSU – Miles Sanders – 19 carries, 91 yards, 2 TD

Top receivers

- ASU – Corey Sutton – 6 receptions, 87 yards
- PSU – K. J. Hamler – 4 receptions, 68 yards, TD

Top defenders

- ASU – Anthony Flory – 9 tackles
- PSU – Jan Johnson – 11 tackles

=== At Pittsburgh ===
Penn State at Pittsburgh – Game summary

Quarter	1	2	3	4	Total
No. 13 Penn State	7	7	16	21	51
Pittsburgh	6	0	0	0	6

at Heinz Field, Pittsburgh, Pennsylvania

- Date: September 8
- Game time: 8:00 p.m. EDT
- Game weather: 58 °F (14 °C); rain
- Game attendance: 68,400
- Referee: John O'Neill
- TV announcers (ABC): Sean McDonough, Todd Blackledge, Holly Rowe
- ESPN Box Score GoPSUsports.com Box Score

Game information

First quarter

- PSU – K. J. Hamler, 32-yard TD run, Jake Pinegar kick good, 12:14 (PSU 7–0)
- UP – Qadree Ollison, 13-yard TD run, 2-point conversion failed, 7:09 (PSU 7–6)

Second quarter

- PSU – Hamler, 14-yard TD pass from Trace McSorley, Pinegar kick good, 0:26 (PSU 14–6)

Third quarter

- PSU – McSorley, 4-yard TD run, Pinegar kick good, 8:36 (PSU 21–6)
- PSU – safety, offensive holding penalty by Pittsburgh (Stefano Millin) in its endzone, 7:38 (PSU 23–6)
- PSU – DeAndre Thompkins, 39-yard punt return for TD, Pinegar kick good, 0:28 (PSU 30–6)

Fourth quarter

- PSU – Mac Hippenhammer, 11-yard pass from McSorley, 11:40 (PSU 37–6)
- PSU – Mark Allen, 4-yard TD run, Pinegar kick good, 6:17 (PSU 44–6)
- PSU – Brandon Polk, 34-yard TD pass from Sean Clifford, Pinegar kick good, 4:21 (PSU 51–6)

Top passers

- PSU – Trace McSorley – 14/30, 145 yards, 2 TD
- UP – Kenny Pickett – 9/18, 55 yards, INT

Top rushers

- PSU – Miles Sanders – 16 carries, 118 yards
- UP – Qadree Ollison – 21 carries, 119 yards, TD

Top receivers

- PSU – Brandon Polk – 2 receptions, 45 yards, TD
- UP – Shocky Jacques−Louis – 2 receptions, 21 yards

Top defenders

- PSU – Kevin Givens – 7 tackles, 2 tackles-for-loss (TFL)
- UP – Quintin Wirginis – 9 tackles, 2.5 tackles-for-loss (TFL), 1 sack

=== Kent State ===
Kent State at Penn State – Game summary

Quarter	1	2	3	4	Total
Kent State	7	3	0	0	10
No. 11 Penn State	21	7	21	14	63

at Beaver Stadium, University Park, Pennsylvania

- Date: September 15
- Game time: 12:00 p.m. EDT
- Game weather: 74 °F (23 °C); cloudy, humid
- Game attendance: 106,528
- Referee: Ron Hudson
- TV announcers (FS1): Tim Brando, Spencer Tillman, Holly Sonders
- ESPN Box Score GoPSUsports.com Box Score

Game information

First quarter

- PSU – DeAndre Thompkins, 40-yard TD pass from Trace McSorley, Jake Pinegar kick good, 12:51 (PSU 7–0)
- KSU – Mike Carrigan, 47-yard TD pass from Woody Barrett, Matthew Trickett kick good, 9:43 (TIE 7–7)
- PSU – McSorley, 1-yard TD run, Pinegar kick good, 5:07 (PSU 14–7)
- PSU – McSorley, 2-yard TD run, Pinegar kick good, 1:09 (PSU 21–7)

Second quarter

- KSU – Trickett, 24-yard field goal, 0:35, (PSU 21–10)
- PSU – McSorley, 13-yard TD run, Pinegar kick good, 0:04 (PSU 28–10)

Third quarter

- PSU – Mark Allen, 7-yard TD run, Pinegar kick good, 10:05 (PSU 35–10)
- PSU – Ricky Slade, 2-yard TD run, Pinegar kick good, 7:42 (PSU 42–10)
- PSU – Brandon Polk, 41-yard TD pass from McSorley, Pinegar kick good, 2:37 (PSU 49–10)

Fourth quarter

- PSU – Daniel George, 95-yard TD pass from Sean Clifford, Pinegar kick good, 6:55 (PSU 56–10)
- PSU – Johnathan Thomas, 15-yard TD run, Pinegar kick good, 1:09 (PSU 63–10)

Top passers

- KSU – Woody Barrett – 20/38, 176 yards, TD
- PSU – Trace McSorley – 11/22, 229 yards, 2 TD, INT

Top rushers

- KSU – Dustin Crum – 3 carries, 23 yards
- PSU – Miles Sanders – 14 carries, 86 yards

Top receivers

- KSU – Antwan Dixon – 5 receptions, 59 yards
- PSU – DeAndre Thompkins – 4 receptions, 101 yards, TD

Top defenders

- KSU – Dalton Hicks – 12 tackles, 0.5 tackles-for-loss (TFL)
- PSU – Cam Brown – 7 tackles, 2 tackles-for-loss (TFL)

=== At Illinois ===
Penn State at Illinois – Game summary

Quarter	1	2	3	4	Total
No. 10 Penn State	7	14	7	35	63
Illinois	7	10	7	0	24

at Memorial Stadium, Champaign, Illinois

- Date: September 21
- Game time: 9:00 p.m. EDT
- Game weather: 68 °F (20 °C); partly cloudy
- Game attendance: 34,704
- Referee: Ron Snodgrass
- TV announcers (FS1): Justin Kutcher, Petros Papadakis, DeMarco Murray
- ESPN Box Score GoPSUsports.com Box Score

Game information

First quarter

- PSU – Miles Sanders, 14-yard TD run, Jake Pinegar kick good, 9:17 (PSU 7–0)
- UI – Reggie Corbin, 2-yard TD run, Chase McLaughlin kick good, 2:16 (TIE 7–7)

Second quarter

- PSU – Sanders, 2-yard TD run, Pinegar kick good, 12:52 (PSU 14–7)
- PSU – Pat Freiermuth, 5-yard TD pass from Trace McSorley, Pinegar kick good, 8:11 (PSU 21–7)
- UI – Ricky Smalling, 6-yard TD pass from M. J. Rivers II, McLaughlin kick good, 6:47 (PSU 21–14)
- UI – McLaughlin, 42-yard field goal, 0:00 (PSU 21–17)

Third quarter

- UI – Smalling, 17-yard TD pass from Trenard Davis, McLaughlin kick good, 10:36 (UI 24–21)
- PSU – Sanders, 48-yard TD run, Pinegar kick good, 8:36 (PSU 28–24)

Fourth quarter

- PSU – Juwan Johnson, 16-yard TD pass from McSorley, Pinegar kick good, 14:53 (PSU 35–24)
- PSU – K. J. Hamler, 21-yard TD pass from McSorley, Pinegar kick good, 14:09 (PSU 42–24)
- PSU – Ricky Slade, 61-yard TD run, Pinegar kick good, 9:58 (PSU 49–24)
- PSU – Slade, 1-yard TD run, Pinegar kick good, 4:24 (PSU 56–24)
- PSU – Journey Brown, 6-yard TD run, Pinegar kick good, 1:56 (PSU 63–24)

Top passers

- PSU – Trace McSorley – 12/19, 160 yards, 3 TD, INT
- UI – M. J. Rivers – 17/28, 149 yards, TD, INT

Top rushers

- PSU – Miles Sanders – 22 carries, 200 yards, 3 TD
- UI – Reggie Corbin – 11 carries, 87 yards, TD

Top receivers

- PSU – Jonathan Holland – 3 receptions, 53 yards
- UI – Carmoni Green – 4 receptions, 49 yards

Top defenders

- PSU – Jonathan Sutherland – 8 tackles, 1 tackles-for-loss (TFL)
- UI – Bobby Roundtree – 12 tackles, 2 tackles-for-loss (TFL), 1 sack

=== No. 4 Ohio State ===
Ohio State at Penn State – Game summary

Quarter	1	2	3	4	Total
No. 4 Ohio State	0	7	7	13	27
No. 9 Penn State	3	10	0	13	26

at Beaver Stadium, University Park, Pennsylvania

- Date: September 29
- Game time: 7:30 p.m. EDT
- Game weather: 60 °F (16 °C) clear, cool
- Game attendance: 110,889
- Referee: Daniel Capron
- TV announcers (ABC): Chris Fowler, Kirk Herbstreit, Maria Taylor, Tom Rinaldi
- ESPN Box Score GoPSUsports.com Box Score

Game information

First quarter

- PSU – Jake Pinegar, 34-yard field goal, 4:58 (PSU 3–0)

Second quarter

- PSU – Pinegar, 39-yard field goal, 11:18 (PSU 6–0)
- PSU – K. J. Hamler 93-yard TD pass from Trace McSorley, Pinegar kick good, 5:59 (PSU 13–0)
- OSU – J. K. Dobbins, 26-yard TD pass from Dwayne Haskins, Sean Nuernberger kick good, 1:50 (PSU 13–7)

Third quarter

- OSU – Dobbins, 4-yard TD run, Nuernberger kick good, 10:22 (OSU 14–13)

Fourth quarter

- PSU – Pat Freiermuth, 2-yard TD pass from McSorley, Pinegar kick good, 12:22 (PSU 20–14)
- PSU – Miles Sanders, 1-yard TD run, 2-point conversion run failed, 8:00 (PSU 26–14)
- OSU – Binjimen Victor, 47-yard TD pass from Haskins, Nuernberger kick good, 6:42 (PSU 26–21)
- OSU – K. J. Hill, 24-yard TD pass from Haskins, 2-point conversion pass failed, 2:03 (OSU 27–26)

Top passers

- OSU – Dwayne Haskins – 22/39, 270 yards, 3 TD, INT
- PSU – Trace McSorley – 16/32, 286 yards, 2 TD

Top rushers

- OSU – J. K. Dobbins – 17 carries, 57 yards, TD
- PSU – Trace McSorley – 25 carries, 175 yards

Top receivers

- OSU – J. K. Dobbins – 2 receptions, 61 yards, TD
- PSU – K. J. Hamler – 4 receptions, 138 yards, TD

Top defenders

- OSU – Chase Young – 6 tackles, 3 tackles-for-loss (TFL), 2 sacks
- OSU – Tuf Borland – 6 tackles, sack
- PSU – Koa Farmer – 8 tackles, 0.5 tackles-for-loss (TFL)
- PSU – Garrett Taylor – 4 tackles, INT

=== Michigan State ===
Michigan State at Penn State – Game summary

Quarter	1	2	3	4	Total
Michigan State	0	7	7	7	21
No. 8 Penn State	7	7	0	3	17

at Beaver Stadium, University Park, Pennsylvania

- Date: October 13
- Game time: 3:30 p.m. EDT
- Game weather: 50 °F (10 °C); cool, cloudy
- Game attendance: 106,685
- Referee: Michael Cannon
- TV announcers (BTN): Kevin Kugler, James Laurinaitis, Lisa Byington
- ESPN Box Score GoPSUsports.com Box Score

Game information

First quarter

- PSU – K. J. Hamler, 5-yard TD pass from Trace McSorley, Jake Pinegar kick good, 5:03 (PSU 7–0)

Second quarter

- MSU – La'Darius Jefferson, 1-yard TD run, Matt Coghlin kick good, 13:25 (TIE 7–7)
- PSU – Miles Sanders, 48-yard TD run, Pinegar kick good, 4:33 (PSU 14–7)

Third quarter

- MSU – Felton Davis III, 20-yard TD pass from Brian Lewerke, Coghlin kick good, 6:10 (TIE 14–14)

Fourth quarter

- PSU – Pinegar, 20-yard field goal, 9:21 (PSU 17–14)
- MSU – Davis, 25-yard TD pass from Lewerke, Coghlin kick good, 0:19 (MSU 21–17)

Top passers

- MSU – Brian Lewerke – 24/52, 259 yards, 2 TD, INT
- PSU – Trace McSorley – 19/32, 192 yards, TD

Top rushers

- MSU – La'Darius Jefferson – 15 carries, 60 yards, TD
- PSU – Miles Sanders – 17 carries, 162 yards, TD

Top receivers

- MSU – Felton Davis III – 8 receptions, 100 yards, 2 TD
- PSU – K. J. Hamler – 5 receptions, 66 yards, TD

Top defenders

- MSU – Khari Willis – 9 tackles
- PSU – Koa Farmer – 6 tackles
- PSU – Garrett Taylor – 6 tackles, INT

=== At Indiana ===
Penn State at Indiana – Game summary

Quarter	1	2	3	4	Total
No. 18 Penn State	7	10	9	7	33
Indiana	14	0	7	7	28

at Memorial Stadium, Bloomington, Indiana

- Date: October 20
- Game time: 3:30 p.m. EDT
- Game weather: 60 °F (16 °C); sunny
- Game attendance: 41,553
- Referee: John O'Neill
- TV announcers (ABC): Steve Levy, Brian Griese, Todd McShay
- ESPN Box Score GoPSUsports.com Box Score

Game information

First quarter

- PSU – Miles Sanders, 1-yard TD run, Jake Pinegar kick good, 13:00 (PSU 7–0)
- IU – Stevie Scott III, 5-yard TD run, Logan Justus kick good, 10:18 (TIE 7–7)
- IU – Ronnie Walker Jr., 30-yard TD run, Justus kick good, 1:06 (IU 14–7)

Second quarter

- PSU – Pat Freiermuth, 23-yard TD pass from Tommy Stevens, Pinegar kick good, 10:08 (TIE 14–14)
- PSU – Pinegar, 27-yard field goal, 6:27 (PSU 17–14)

Third quarter

- PSU – Pinegar, 32-yard field goal, 7:16 (PSU 20–14)
- IU – Scott, 3-yard TD run, Justus kick good, 4:01 (IU 21–20)
- PSU – Trace McSorley, 5-yard TD run, Pinegar kick blocked, 3:41 (PSU 26–21)

Fourth quarter

- PSU – McSorley, 4-yard TD run, Pinegar kick good, 10:25 (PSU 33–21)
- IU – J-Shun Harris II, 21-yard TD pass from Peyton Ramsey, Justus kick good, 0:49 (PSU 33–28)

Top passers

- PSU – Trace McSorley – 19/36, 220 yards, INT
- IU – Peyton Ramsey – 26/36, 236 yards, TD, INT

Top rushers

- PSU – Trace McSorley – 19 carries, 107 yards, 2 TD
- IU – Stevie Scott III – 26 carries, 138 yards, 2 TD

Top receivers

- PSU – Juwan Johnson – 2 receptions, 72 yards
- IU – Luke Timian – 6 receptions, 58 yards

Top defenders

- PSU – Yetur Gross-Matos – 10 tackles, 2 tackles-for-loss (TFL), 2 sacks
- IU – Marcelino Ball – 10 tackles, 1.5 tackles-for-loss (TFL), 0.5 sacks

=== No. 18 Iowa ===
Iowa at Penn State – Game summary

Quarter	1	2	3	4	Total
No. 18 Iowa	12	5	0	7	24
No. 17 Penn State	7	10	10	3	30

at Beaver Stadium, University Park, Pennsylvania

- Date: October 27
- Game time: 3:30 p.m. EDT
- Game weather: 41 °F (5 °C); cloudy, rain
- Game attendance: 105,244
- Referee: Larry Smith
- TV announcers (ESPN): Steve Levy, Brian Griese, Todd McShay
- ESPN Box Score GoPSUsports.com Box Score

Game information

First quarter

- UI – Safety, Blake Gillikin punt blocked out of end zone by Dominique Dafney, 14:08 (UI 2–0)
- UI – Miguel Recinos, 27-yard field goal, 10:09 (UI 5–0)
- UI – Sam Brincks, 10-yard TD pass from Colten Rastetter, Recinos kick good, 5:22 (UI 12–0)
- PSU – Pat Freiermuth, 18-yard TD pass from Trace McSorley, Jake Pinegar kick good, 0:27 (UI 12–7)

Second quarter

- UI – Safety, snap out of end zone, 13:39 (UI 14–7)
- PSU – Tommy Stevens, 3-yard TD run, Pinegar kick good, 6:45 (TIE 14–14)
- UI – Recinos, 49-yard field goal, 4:32 (UI 17–14)
- PSU – Pinegar, 45-yard field goal, 0:03 (TIE 17–17)

Third quarter

- PSU – McSorley, 51-yard TD run, Pinegar kick good, 12:10 (PSU 24–17)
- PSU – Pinegar, 49-yard field goal, 4:10 (PSU 27–17)

Fourth quarter

- UI – Geno Stone, 24-yard interception return, Recinos kick good, 10:00 (PSU 27–24)
- PSU – Pinegar, 44-yard field goal, 8:24 (PSU 30–24)

Top passers

- UI – Nate Stanley – 18/49, 205 yards, 2 INT
- PSU – Trace McSorley – 11/25, 167 yards, TD, INT

Top rushers

- UI – Mekhi Sargent – 16 carries, 91 yards
- PSU – Trace McSorley – 12 carries, 63 yards, TD

Top receivers

- UI – T. J. Hockenson – 3 receptions, 63 yards
- PSU – K. J. Hamler – 5 receptions, 96 yards

Top defenders

- UI – Amani Hooker – 6 tackles
- UI – Matt Nelson – 6 tackles, 0.5 tackles-for-loss (TFL)
- PSU – Yetur Gross-Matos – 9 tackles, 4 tackles-for-loss (TFL), 2 sacks

=== At No. 5 Michigan ===
Penn State at Michigan – Game summary

Quarter	1	2	3	4	Total
No. 14 Penn State	0	0	0	7	7
No. 5 Michigan	7	7	14	14	42

at Michigan Stadium, Ann Arbor, Michigan

- Date: November 3
- Game time: 3:45 p.m. EDT
- Game weather: 43 °F (6 °C); partly cloudy
- Game attendance: 111,747
- Referee: Jeff Servinski
- TV announcers (ESPN): Chris Fowler, Kirk Herbstreit, Maria Taylor
- ESPN Box Score GoPSUsports.com Box Score

Game information

First quarter

- UM – Shea Patterson, 1-yard TD run, Quinn Nordin kick good, 8:12 (UM 7–0)

Second quarter

- UM – Donovan Peoples-Jones, 23-yard TD pass from Patterson, Nordin kick good, 6:52 (UM 14–0)

Third quarter

- UM – Zach Gentry, 7-yard TD pass from Patterson, Nordin kick good, 0:56 (UM 21–0)
- UM – Brandon Watson, 62-yard interception return for TD, Nordin kick good, 0:09 (UM 28–0)

Fourth quarter

- UM – Karan Higdon, 4-yard TD run, Nordin kick good, 9:49 (UM 35–0)
- UM – Chris Evans, 1-yard TD run, Nordin kick good, 7:44 (UM 42–0)
- PSU – Tommy Stevens, 8-yard TD run, Jake Pinegar kick good, 1:59 (UM 42–7)

Top passers

- PSU – Trace McSorley – 5/13, 83 yards, INT
- UM – Shea Patterson – 11/17, 144 yards, 2 TD

Top rushers

- PSU – Tommy Stevens – 10 carries, 52 yards, TD
- UM – Karan Higdon – 20 carries, 132 yards, TD

Top receivers

- PSU – Pat Freiermuth – 3 receptions, 51 yards
- UM – Donovan Peoples-Jones – 3 receptions, 38 yards, TD

Top defenders

- PSU – Jan Johnson – 10 tackles, 1 tackle-for-loss (TFL)
- UM – Devin Bush Jr. – 7 tackles

=== Wisconsin ===
Wisconsin at Penn State – Game summary

Quarter	1	2	3	4	Total
Wisconsin	7	0	3	0	10
No. 21 Penn State	10	6	3	3	22

at Beaver Stadium, University Park, Pennsylvania

- Date: November 10
- Game time: 12:00 p.m. ET
- Game weather: 36 °F (2 °C); partly cloudy, windy
- Game attendance: 105,396
- Referee: Jerry McGinn
- TV announcers (ABC): Mark Jones, Dusty Dvoracek, Molly McGrath
- ESPN Box Score GoPSUsports.com Box Score

Game information

First quarter

- UW – Jonathan Taylor, 71-yard TD run, Rafael Gaglianone kick good, 11:04 (UW 7–0)
- PSU – DeAndre Thompkins, 14-yard TD pass from Trace McSorley, Jake Pinegar kick good, 7:41 (TIE 7–7)
- PSU – Pinegar, 49-yard field goal, 1:53 (PSU 10–7)

Second quarter

- PSU – Miles Sanders, 1-yard TD run, Pinegar kick missed, 8:09 (PSU 16–7)

Third quarter

- UW – Rafael Gaglianone, 28-yard field goal, 9:45 (PSU 16–10)
- PSU – Pinegar, 42-yard field goal, 4:07 (PSU 19–10)

Fourth quarter

- PSU – Pinegar, 23-yard field goal, 7:23 (PSU 22–10)

Top passers

- UW – Jack Coan – 9/20, 60 yards, 2 INT
- PSU – Trace McSorley – 19/25, 160 yards, TD

Top rushers

- UW – Jonathan Taylor – 20 carries, 185 yards, TD
- PSU – Miles Sanders – 23 carries, 159 yards, TD

Top receivers

- UW – Danny Davis III – 2 receptions, 24 yards
- PSU – Jahan Dotson – 2 receptions, 39 yards

Top defenders

- UW – T. J. Edwards – 14 tackles
- PSU – Micah Parsons – 7 tackles

=== At Rutgers ===
Penn State at Rutgers – Game summary

Quarter	1	2	3	4	Total
No. 16 Penn State	3	10	0	7	20
Rutgers	0	0	0	7	7

at HighPoint.com Stadium, Piscataway, New Jersey

- Date: November 17
- Game time: 12:00 p.m. ET
- Game weather: 52 °F (11 °C); mostly cloudy
- Game attendance: 44,840
- Referee: Michael Cannon
- TV announcers (BTN): Chris Vosters, Shaun O'Hara
- ESPN Box Score GoPSUsports.com Box Score

Game information

First quarter

- PSU – Jake Pinegar, 22-yard field goal, 2:27 (PSU 3–0)

Second quarter

- PSU – Pat Freiermuth, 6-yard TD pass from Trace McSorley, Pinegar kick good, 2:04 (PSU 10–0)
- PSU – Pinegar, 19-yard field goal, 0:00 (PSU 13–0)

Third quarter

No scoring

Fourth quarter

- PSU – Freiermuth, 18-yard TD pass from McSorley, Pinegar kick good, 13:06 (PSU 20–0)
- RU – Raheem Blackshear, 2-yard TD run, Justin Davidovicz kick good, 9:23 (PSU 20–7)

Top passers

- PSU – Trace McSorley – 17/37, 183 yards, 2 TD, INT
- RU – Giovanni Rescigno – 2/8, 28 yards

Top rushers

- PSU – Miles Sanders – 27 carries, 88 yards
- RU – Raheem Blackshear – 22 carries, 102 yards, TD

Top receivers

- PSU – K. J. Hamler – 5 receptions, 71 yards
- RU – Bo Melton – 3 receptions, 29 yards

Top defenders

- PSU – Koa Farmer – 8 tackles, 1 tackle-for-loss (TFL)
- RU – Deonte Roberts – 10 tackles, 0.5 tackles-for-loss (TFL)

=== Maryland ===
Maryland at Penn State – Game summary

Quarter	1	2	3	4	Total
Maryland	3	0	0	0	3
No. 15 Penn State	14	3	7	14	38

at Beaver Stadium, University Park, Pennsylvania

- Date: November 24
- Game time: 3:30 p.m. ET
- Game weather: 33 °F (1 °C); rain, freezing drizzle
- Game attendance: 98,422
- Referee: Daniel Capron
- TV announcers (ABC): Mark Jones, Dusty Dvoracek, Molly McGrath
- ESPN Box Score GoPSUsports.com Box Score

Game information

First quarter

- PSU – Trace McSorley, 3-yard TD run, Jake Pinegar kick good, 13:24 (PSU 7–0)
- UM – Joseph Petrino, 26-yard field goal, 4:53 (PSU 7–3)
- PSU – McSorley, 20-yard TD run, Pinegar kick good, 1:58 (PSU 14–3)

Second quarter

- PSU – Pinegar, 25-yard field goal, 2:06 (PSU 17–3)

Third quarter

- PSU – Ricky Slade, 8-yard TD run, Pinegar kick good, 9:10 (PSU 24–3)

Fourth quarter

- PSU – Pat Freiermuth, 5-yard TD pass from McSorley, Pinegar kick good, 12:24 (PSU 31–3)
- PSU – Slade, 1-yard TD run, Pinegar kick good, 6:13 (PSU 38–3)

Top passers

- UM – Tyrrell Pigrome – 14/23, 185 yards
- PSU – Trace McSorley – 12/22, 230 yards, TD

Top rushers

- UM – Javon Leake – 11 carries, 34 yards
- PSU – Miles Sanders – 14 carries, 128 yards

Top receivers

- UM – Brian Cobbs – 2 receptions, 58 yards
- PSU – K. J. Hamler – 3 receptions, 90 yards

Top defenders

- UM – Isaiah Davis – 9 tackles
- PSU – Cam Brown – 5 tackles, 1.5 tackles-for-loss (TFL), 1 sack

=== Vs. No. 16 Kentucky (Citrus Bowl) ===
Penn State vs. Kentucky – Game summary

Quarter	1	2	3	4	Total
No. 13 Penn State	0	7	0	17	24
No. 16 Kentucky	10	0	17	0	27

at Camping World Stadium, Orlando, Florida

- Date: January 1, 2019
- Game time: 1:00 p.m. ET
- Game weather: 79 °F (26 °C); bright sunshine, warm, humid
- Game attendance: 59,167
- Referee: Riley Johnson
- TV announcers (ABC): Dave Flemming, Brock Huard, Laura Rutledge
- ESPN Box Score GoPSUsports.com Box Score

Game information

First quarter

- UK – Miles Butler, 28-yard field goal, 12:23 (UK 3–0)
- UK – Lynn Bowden, 58-yard TD punt return, Butler kick good, 0:45 (UK 10–0)

Second quarter

- PSU – Nick Bowers, 1-yard TD pass from Trace McSorley, Jake Pinegar kick good, 13:56 (UK 10–7)

Third quarter

- UK – Benny Snell, 2-yard TD run, Butler kick good, 12:38 (UK 17–7)
- UK – Butler, 28-yard field goal, 3:48 (UK 20–7)
- UK – Snell, 12-yard TD run, Butler kick good, 1:35 (UK 27–7)

Fourth quarter

- PSU – McSorley, 1-yard TD run, Pinegar kick good, 13:37 (UK 27–14)
- PSU – Pat Freiermuth, 18-yard TD pass from McSorley, Pinegar kick good, 9:00 (UK 27–21)
- PSU – Pinegar, 32-yard field goal, 4:12 (UK 27–24)

Top passers

- PSU – Trace McSorley – 17/33, 246 yards, 2 TD, INT
- UK – Terry Wilson – 9/15, 121 yards

Top rushers

- PSU – Trace McSorley – 19 carries, 75 yards, TD
- UK – Benny Snell – 26 carries, 144 yards, 2 TD

Top receivers

- PSU – DeAndre Thompkins – 4 receptions, 74 yards
- UK – Lynn Bowden – 5 receptions, 84 yards

Top defenders

- PSU – Micah Parsons – 13 tackles
- UK – Darius West – 10 tackles

== Rankings ==
Ranking movements Legend: ██ Increase in ranking ██ Decrease in ranking т = Tied with team above or below
	Week															
Poll	Pre	1	2	3	4	5	6	7	8	9	10	11	12	13	14	Final
AP	10	13	11	10–T	9	11	8	18	17	14	21	16	15	14	13	17
Coaches	9	10	10	9	9	11	8	16	16	13	20	15	14	12	12	17
CFP	Not released									14	20	14	12	12	12	Not released

== Awards and honors ==
All-Big Ten
Player	Position	Coaches	Media
Amani Oruwariye	DB	1	1
Yetur Gross-Matos	DL	3	1
Trace McSorley	QB	2	2
Miles Sanders	RB	2	2
Connor McGovern	OG	3	3
Ryan Bates	OT	3	3
Shareef Miller	DL	3	3
K. J. Hamler	WR	HM	HM
Pat Freiermuth	TE	HM	HM
Steven Gonzalez	OG	HM	HM
Garrett Taylor	DB	HM	HM
John Reid	DB	HM	HM
Robert Windsor	DL	HM	HM
K. J. Hamler	PR/KR	HM	HM
Micah Parsons	DL	–	HM
Nick Scott	DB	–	HM
HM = Honorable mention. Reference:

== Players drafted into the NFL ==
Round	Pick	Player	Position	NFL club
2	53	Miles Sanders	RB	Philadelphia Eagles
4	138	Shareef Miller	DE	Philadelphia Eagles
5	146	Amani Oruwariye	CB	Detroit Lions
6	197	Trace McSorley	QB	Baltimore Ravens
7	243	Nick Scott	S	Los Angeles Rams
