= Sean Spencer (American football) =

American football player and coach (born 1970)

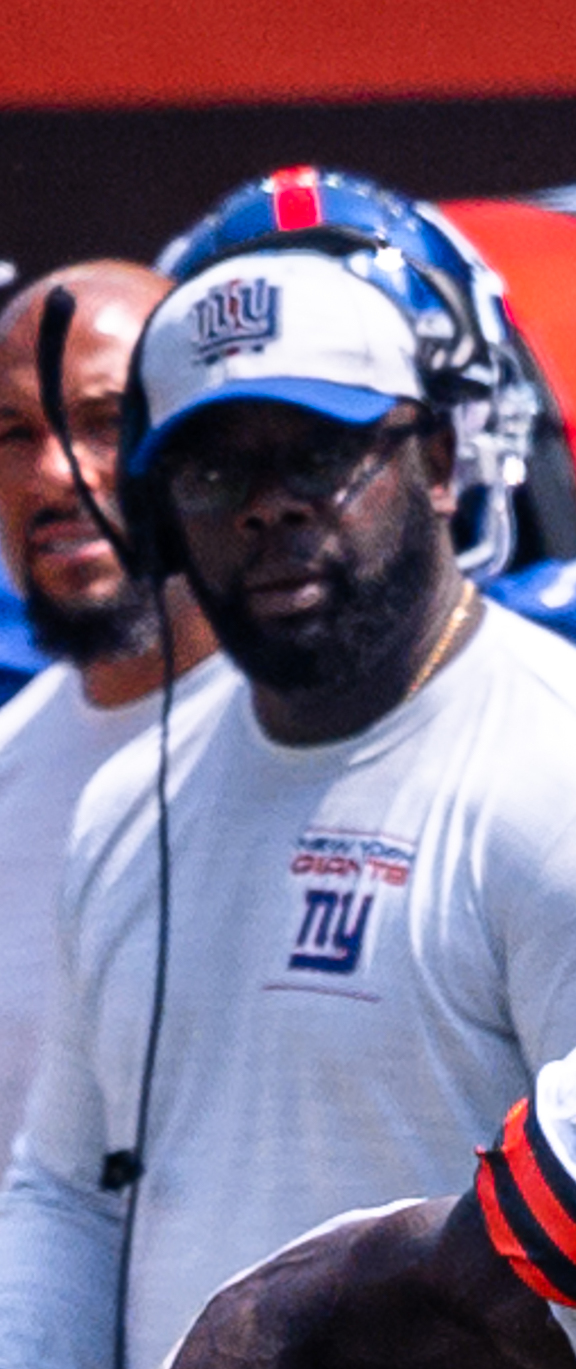
- Spencer in 2021

Virginia Tech Hokies
- Title: Defensive line coach

Personal information
- Born: December 15, 1970 (age 55); Hartford, Connecticut, U.S.

Career information
- High school: Bulkeley (Hartford, Connecticut)
- College: Clarion

Career history
- Wesleyan (1995) Wide receivers coach & tight ends coach; Shippensburg (1996–1997) Running backs coach; Trinity (CT) (1998–1999) Running backs coach; Trinity (CT) (2000) Defensive line coach; UMass (2001–2003) Defensive line coach; Holy Cross (2004) Defensive line coach; Villanova (2005) Linebackers coach; Hofstra (2006) Defensive line coach; UMass (2007–2008) Defensive line coach; Bowling Green (2009–2010) Defensive line coach; Vanderbilt (2011–2013) Defensive line coach; Penn State (2014–2017) Defensive line coach; Penn State (2018–2019) Associate head coach & defensive line coach; New York Giants (2020–2021) Defensive line coach; Florida (2022–2023) Co-defensive coordinator & defensive line coach; Texas A&M (2024–2025) Defensive line coach; Virginia Tech (2026–present) Defensive line coach

Sean Spencer (born December 15, 1970), nicknamed "Coach Chaos", is an American football coach and former player. He is the defensive line coach at Virginia Tech, a position he has held since December 2025. Spencer has served as defensive line coach at a number of NCAA Division I programs, including at the FCS level and in the SEC, Big Ten, and ACC. Spencer also served as the defensive line coach and run game coordinator for the New York Giants of the National Football League (NFL) from 2020 to 2021. He played college football as a safety at Clarion University of Pennsylvania—now known as PennWest Clarion.

== Early life ==
A native of Hartford, Connecticut, Spencer is a 1988 graduate of Bulkeley High School, where he was a teammate of future National Football League (NFL) coach Eric Mangini. He and Mangini played for Graham Martin, whom Spencer said may have been his most important coach because he sparked his interest in teaching.

== College playing career ==
Spencer, was the starting free safety for the NCAA Division II, Clarion Golden Eagles for three seasons. He was named to the 1992 Division II Preseason All-America team by The Sporting News.

== Coaching career ==
=== Wesleyan ===
Former high school teammate Eric Mangini helped Spencer land his first coaching job at Wesleyan University, Mangini's alma mater. He coached wide receivers and tight ends for the Division III, Cardinals and learned under head coach Frank Hauser. Spencer nearly landed an entry-level job with Bill Belichick and the Cleveland Browns, where Mangini was working, but the team wanted someone local.

=== Shippensburg ===
In 1996 and 1997, Spencer landed in the PSAC coaching running backs for the Division II, Shippensburg Raiders.

=== Trinity ===
After this, Spencer would return home to Hartford where he coached three seasons for the Division III, Trinity Bantams. He would coach running backs in 1998 and 1999 and defensive line in 2000 for head coach Chuck Priore.

=== UMass ===
Spencer served as the defensive line coach for the Division I-AA, UMass Minutemen, and head coach Mark Whipple from 2001 to 2003. In his final season, the Minutemen finish second in the Atlantic 10 Conference with 34 sacks, and three defensive linemen earned all conference honors. Standout Vladamar Brower, earned All-America honors, and was a Buck Buchanan Award finalist.

=== Holy Cross ===
Spencer spent 2004 coaching the defensive line for the Division I-AA, Holy Cross Crusaders, and head coach Tom Gilmore. Spencer's assistant defensive line coach that season was first year coach Ricky Rahne, whom he would later coach with at Vanderbilt and Penn State.

=== Villanova ===
After one season at Holy Cross, Spencer served as linebackers coach for the Division I-AA Villanova Wildcats in 2005.

=== Hofstra ===
In 2006, Spencer would coach defensive line for the FCS, Hofstra Pride and had an NFL summer internship with the New York Jets.

=== UMass ===
In 2007, Spencer made a return to UMass to coach the defensive line and coordinate the special teams for head coach Don Brown. He would spend two successful seasons with the Minutemen, helping the team to consecutive Colonial Athletic titles. Under Spencer's tutelage, the Minutemen would record 44 sacks in the 2007. Spencer also had success leading the special teams, mentoring All-CAA kick returner Courtney Robinson and All-America punter Brett Arnold.

=== Bowling Green ===
Spencer coached defensive line for the Bowling Green Falcons and head coach Dave Clawson in 2009–2010.

=== Vanderbilt ===
In 2011, Spencer was hired by coach James Franklin at Vanderbilt, to coach the defensive line. During his three seasons at Vanderbilt, Spencer's defensive lines, nicknamed the "Wild Dogs" helped Vanderbilt finish in the Top 25 in total defense and recorded 42.5 tackles for loss in 2013 alone. In 2011 Tim Fugger earned second team All-SEC honors, posting 8 sacks, 11.5 tackles for loss and was drafted by the Indianapolis Colts.

=== Penn State ===
On January 24, 2014, it was officially announced that Sean Spencer would be following James Franklin to Penn State as the defensive line coach. Prior to the official announcement, it was reported that the position was first offered to long time Penn State assistant Larry Johnson but was turned down by the coach.

In 2015, Spencer's defensive line led the FBS in sacks per game (3.54), sixth in tackles for loss (8.2), and 14th in total defense (324.5). Carl Nassib broke Penn State's single-season sack record with 15.5 and won the Rotary Lombardi Award, Lott IMPACT Trophy, Ted Hendricks Award and Nagurski–Woodson Defensive Player of the Year. Nassib was selected in the third round by the Cleveland Browns in the 2016 NFL draft with the 65th pick. Defensive tackle Austin Johnson garnered second team All-Big Ten honors and was selected by the Tennessee Titans in the second round with the 43rd pick. Defensive tackle Anthony Zettel who finished third team All-Big Ten was selected in the sixth round by the Detroit Lions with the 202nd pick.

Spencer's defensive line helped the Nittany Lions finish the 2017 season with 42 sacks, marking the third-straight season with 40 or more sacks. It was the first time since 2005–07 Penn State had three consecutive season with 40 or more sacks. Besides the on-field success, the "Wild Dogs" and defensive line coach Sean Spencer donated 68 turkeys and 100 pounds of potatoes to the State College Food Bank for Thanksgiving food distributions in 2017. The donation was a partnership with the Student Book Store, which sold the official "Wild Dogs" T-shirts.

Spencer, who would add the title of associate head coach in 2018, helped the Nittany Lions defense lead the country in sacks per game with 3.62 and fourth in tackles for loss with 8.2 per game. It was the fourth straight season the defense finished with 40 or more total sacks. The defensive line was led by sophomore defensive end Yetur Gross-Matos who finished the season with 8 sacks and 20 tackles for loss, earning him first team All-Big Ten honors. Junior defensive end Shareef Miller earned third team All-Big Ten, while junior defensive tackle Robert Windsor received honorable mention recognition. Miller declared for the 2019 NFL draft and was selected by the Philadelphia Eagles in the fourth round, 138th overall.

=== New York Giants ===
It was announced that Spencer would make the jump to the NFL for the 2020 season coaching with the New York Giants under Joe Judge.

=== Florida ===
It was announced on January 11, 2022, that Spencer would join Florida as its co-defensive coordinator and defensive-line coach under head coach Billy Napier, after originally accepting the same position at Duke.

=== Texas A&M ===
It was announced on December 3, 2023, that Spencer would join Texas A&M as its defensive-line coach under head coach Mike Elko.

=== Virginia Tech ===
On February 4, 2026, James Franklin announced that Spencer would serve as the Virginia Tech Hokies run game coordinator and defensive line coach.
