= Winsor (surname) =

Winsor is a surname. Notable people with the surname include:

- Alfred Winsor (1880–1961), American ice hockey coach and amateur ice hockey player
- Allen Winsor (born 1976), American judge of the United States District Court for the Northern District of Florida
- Charles P. Winsor (1895–1951), American engineer, physiologist, and biostatistician
- Curtin Winsor Jr. (born 1939), American diplomat
- Earl Winsor (1918–1989), Canadian master mariner and politician in Newfoundland
- Frank E. Winsor (1870–1939), American civil engineer
- George McLeod Winsor (1856–1939), British writer
- Hugh Winsor (born 1938), Canadian journalist
- Justin Winsor (1831–1897), American writer and historian
- Jack Winsor, Canadian politician
- Jacqueline Winsor (1941–2024), American sculptor from Newfoundland
- Kathleen Winsor (1915–2003), American romance novelist
- Mari Winsor (1950–2020), American fitness instructor known for popularizing pilates
- Mary Winsor (1869–1956), American suffragist
- Mulford Winsor (1874–1956), American newspaperman
- Naboth Winsor (1916–1997), Newfoundland historian
- Nathan G. Winsor (1892–1959), Newfoundland businessman and politician
- Ray Winsor (1933–2006), Canadian dentist and politician in Newfoundland
- Reg Winsor (1891–1963), Australian railway administrator
- Richard Winsor (born 1982), British actor and dancer
- Robert Winsor (1858–1930), American banker and philanthropist
- Robert G. Winsor (1876–1929), Newfoundland fisherman and politician
- Roy Winsor (1912–1987), American soap opera writer
- Sam Winsor, Canadian politician
- Terry Winsor, British film director
- Tom Winsor (born 1957), British lawyer and economic regulator

== Disambiguation pages ==
- Frederick Winsor (disambiguation)
- William Winsor (disambiguation)

== See also ==
- Windsor (surname)
