= Windsor (surname) =

Windsor is an English surname. Notable people with the surname include:

== Arts and Entertainment ==
- Barbara Windsor (1937–2020), English actress
- Claire Windsor (1892–1972), American actress
- Devon Windsor (born 1994), American model
- Frank Windsor (1928–2020), English television actor
- Gerard Windsor (born 1944), Australian author
- Gloria Windsor (born 1935), American model
- Harry Windsor-Fry (1862–1947), British painter and educator
- Marie Windsor (1919–2000), American actress
- Robin Windsor (1979–2024), British dancer
- Saaphyri Windsor, American reality television personality

== Nobility ==
- Lady Amelia Windsor (born 1995), British fashion model
- Lady Marina Windsor (born 1992), British philanthropic executive
- Andrew Windsor, 1st Baron Windsor (1467–1543), English nobleman
- Lord Frederick Windsor (born 1979), member of the British royal family
  - Sophie Winkleman (Lady Frederick Windsor) (born 1980), wife of Lord Frederick
- Lady Gabriella Windsor (born 1981), reporter, member of the British royal family
- Lady Louise Mountbatten-Windsor (born 2003), granddaughter to Queen Elizabeth II
- Lord Nicholas Windsor (born 1970), member of the British royal family, and his son Albert
- Duke of Windsor, formerly King Edward VIII of the United Kingdom
- Wallis Simpson (Wallis, Duchess of Windsor), wife of the Duke
- Earl of Windsor
- Elizabeth II (1926 – –2022, Elizabeth Alexandra Mary Windsor), Queen of the United Kingdom
- Viscount Windsor
- Baron Windsor

== Politics ==
- Tony Windsor (born 1950), Australian independent politician
- Walter Windsor (1884–1945), British Labour Party politician

== Sports ==
- Bobby Windsor (born 1948), Welsh rugby union player
- Harley Windsor (born 1996), Australian figure skater
- Jason Windsor (born 1982), American baseball player
- John Windsor (born 1940), American basketball player
- Annette Woodward nee Windsor (born 1947), Australian Pistol Shooter

== Other ==
- Cecil Stanley Windsor (1879–1926), managing director of Windsor, British automobile company
- Edith Windsor (1929–2017), American LGBT rights activist
- Peter Windsor (born 1952), British journalist and reporter
- Richard Windsor, American explorer
- Robert Windsor (disambiguation), multiple people
- Roger Windsor, British labour union leader and former chief executive of the National Union of Mineworkers

== See also ==
- House of Windsor, the house or dynasty of the present British Royal Family
- Winsor (surname)
