= 2019 Citrus Bowl =

American college football bowl game

2019 Vrbo Citrus Bowl
- 73rd Citrus Bowl
Kentucky Wildcats	Penn State Nittany Lions
(9–3)	(9–3)
SEC	Big Ten
27	24
Head coach: Mark Stoops	Head coach: James Franklin
AP / Coaches / CFP; 16 / 15 / 14	AP / Coaches / CFP; 13 / 12 / 12
	1	2	3	4	Total
Kentucky	10	0	17	0	27
Penn State	0	7	0	17	24
- Date: January 1, 2019
- Season: 2018
- Stadium: Camping World Stadium
- Location: Orlando, Florida
- MVP: Benny Snell (RB, Kentucky)
- Favorite: Penn State by 6.5
- Referee: Riley Johnson (ACC)
- Attendance: 59,167
- Payout: US$8,550,000

United States TV coverage
- Network: ABC & ESPN Radio
- Announcers: Dave Flemming, Brock Huard and Laura Rutledge (ABC); Beth Mowins, Anthony Becht and Rocky Boiman (ESPN Radio)

The 2019 Citrus Bowl was a college football bowl game that was played on January 1, 2019. It was the 73rd edition of what is now the Citrus Bowl, and was one of the 2018–19 bowl games concluding the 2018 FBS football season. Sponsored by VRBO, a vacation rental marketplace owned by HomeAway, the game was officially known as the VRBO Citrus Bowl.

== Teams ==
The game was played between the Penn State Nittany Lions of the Big Ten Conference and the Kentucky Wildcats of the Southeastern Conference. The teams had previously met five times, with Penn State holding a 3–2 edge; their most recent meeting was the 1999 Outback Bowl, won by Penn State.

=== Penn State Nittany Lions ===
Penn State received and accepted a bid to the Citrus Bowl on December 2. The Nittany Lions entered the bowl with a 9–3 record (6–3 in conference).

=== Kentucky Wildcats ===
Kentucky received and accepted a bid to the Citrus Bowl on December 2. The Wildcats entered the bowl with a 9–3 record (5–3 in conference).

== Game summary ==
=== Scoring summary ===
Scoring summary

Quarter	Time	Drive			Team	Scoring information	Score	
Quarter	Time	Plays	Yards	TOP	Team	Scoring information	UK	PSU
1	12:23	5	24	1:52	UK	28-yard field goal by Miles Butler	3	0
1	0:45				UK	Punt returned 58 yards for touchdown by Lynn Bowden, Miles Butler kick good	10	0
2	13:56	5	75	1:49	PSU	Nick Bowers 1-yard touchdown reception from Trace McSorley, Jake Pinegar kick good	10	7
3	12:38	6	65	2:22	UK	Benny Snell 2-yard touchdown run, Miles Butler kick good	17	7
3	3:48	11	65	6:05	UK	28-yard field goal by Miles Butler	20	7
3	1:35	2	66	0:57	UK	Benny Snell 12-yard touchdown run, Miles Butler kick good	27	7
4	13:37	10	75	2:58	PSU	Trace McSorley 1-yard touchdown run, Jake Pinegar kick good	27	14
4	9:00	6	60	2:24	PSU	Pat Freiermuth 18-yard touchdown reception from Trace McSorley, Jake Pinegar kick good	27	21
4	4:12	12	61	3:34	PSU	32-yard field goal by Jake Pinegar	27	24
"TOP" = time of possession. For other American football terms, see Glossary of American football.							27	24

=== Statistics ===
	1	2	3	4	Total
No. 14 Wildcats	10	0	17	0	27
No. 12 Nittany Lions	0	7	0	17	24

Statistics	UK	PSU
First downs	16	22
Plays–yards	57–297	75–410
Rushes–yards	42–176	40–164
Passing yards	121	246
Passing: comp–att–int	9–15–0	17–33–1
Time of possession	30:42	29:18

Team	Category	Player	Statistics
Kentucky	Passing	Terry Wilson	9/15, 121 yds
Kentucky	Rushing	Benny Snell	26 car, 144 yds, 2 TD
Kentucky	Receiving	Lynn Bowden	5 rec, 84 yds
Penn State	Passing	Trace McSorley	17/33, 246 yds, 2 TD, 1 INT
Penn State	Rushing	Trace McSorley	19 car, 75 yds
Penn State	Receiving	DeAndre Thompkins	4 rec, 74 yds
