= Matt Limegrover =

American football player and coach (born 1968)

Current position
- Title: Assistant offensive line coach
- Team: Minnesota
- Conference: Big Ten

Biographical details
- Born: November 26, 1968 (age 57); Pittsburgh, Pennsylvania, U.S.

Playing career
- 1987–1990: Chicago
- Position: Offensive lineman

Coaching career (HC unless noted)
- 1991–1993: Chicago (OC/OL/TE)
- 1994: Chicago (interim HC)
- 1995–1996: Northwestern (GA)
- 1997–1998: Ferris State (OL)
- 1999–2000: Emporia State (OL)
- 2001–2007: Southern Illinois (OC/OL)
- 2008–2010: Northern Illinois (OC/OL)
- 2011–2015: Minnesota (AHC/OC/OL)
- 2016–2019: Penn State (RGC/OL)
- 2020: Michigan (analyst)
- 2021: Arkansas State (OL)
- 2022: Arkansas State (TE)
- 2023: Kent State (co-OC/OL)
- 2024: Kent State (RGC/OL)
- 2025–present: Minnesota (assistant OL)

Matt Limegrover (born November 26, 1968) is an American college football coach. He is currently the assistant offensive line coach at Minnesota, a position he has held since 2025. He previously the run game coordinator and offensive line coach for Kent State University, until stepping away following the 2024 season. Prior to Kent State, Limegrover served as the offensive line coach at Arkansas State, offensive coordinator at Minnesota, Northern Illinois, Southern Illinois, and Chicago.

== Early life ==
Limegrover, a Pittsburgh native, began playing football in the fourth grade for the father of former Penn State offensive coordinator Joe Moorhead. He attended Central Catholic High School and graduated from the University of Chicago in 1991 and holds a master's degree from Northwestern University. Limegrover interned with the Major League Baseball team Chicago White Sox with classmate Kim Ng a high ranking MLB executive.

== College playing career ==
Limegrover was a 6–2, 265-pound lineman for the Chicago Maroons, an NCAA Division III team, from 1987 to 1990 and was Honorable Mention All-University Athletic Association (UAA) in 1990.

== Coaching career ==
From 1991 to 1994, Limegrover spent his first four years of his coaching career at his alma mater, Chicago, serving in a variety of roles that included interim head coach, offensive coordinator, offensive line coach and tight ends coach. The following two seasons Limegrover served as a graduate assistant for the Northwestern Wildcats and head coach Gary Barnett who won back-to-back Big Ten Championships in 1995 and 1996.

From there Limegrover served as the run game coordinator and offensive line coach for Ferris State in 1997 and 1998. The next two seasons Limegrover serve das the offensive line coach for Emporia State and head coach Jerry Kill who he would work under for the next 17 seasons.

As offensive coordinator from 2001 to 2007l Limegrover guided Southern Illinois to six consecutive seasons finishing in the top ten in scoring, nationally. From there serving as the offensive coordinator for FBS Northern Illinois, Limegrover helped the Huskies to three consecutive bowl appearances and the 2010 MAC West title.

After coach Jerry Kill retired because of epilepsy with five games remaining in the 2015 season, defensive coordinator Tracy Claeys was named as Minnesota's head coach. One day after the conclusion of the 2015 season coach Claeys fired offensive coordinator Limegrover and quarterbacks coach Jim Zebrowski to make a change that better fit his offensive philosophy.

On January 13, 2016, he was hired as the offensive line coach for Penn State and head coach James Franklin. Limegrover spent four seasons at Penn State during which time he saw his offensive line unit help the Nittany Lions capture the 2016 Big Ten title. Limegrover and the Nittany Lions team would experience more success in the 2017 season, going 11-2 and finishing with a Fiesta Bowl victory. In 2018, Penn State saw its best rushing production in 10 years, averaging 204.9 yards per game. That was good enough to finish 29th nationally, and fifth in the Big Ten. That season the offensive line was led by center Connor McGovern, who was drafted in the 3rd round of the 2019 NFL draft, and tackle Ryan Bates. Despite an 11-2 record and Penn State putting up nearly 400 rushing yards in a victory over Memphis in the Cotton Bowl Classic, the Nittany Lions did not renew Limegrover's contract at the conclusion of the 2019 season.

After spending a year as an analyst on Jim Harbaugh's Michigan staff, Limegrover joined Butch Jones' inaugural Arkansas State staff as the offensive line coach for the 2021 season.

In 2023 he joined Kenni Burns' coaching staff at Kent State as co-offensive coordinator and offensive line coach.
