= William Windsor =

William Windsor may refer to:

- William de Windsor (c. 1325 – 1384), English administrator
- William of Windsor (1348–1348), sixth son of Edward III
- Prince William of Gloucester (1941–1972), grandson of George V and member of the House of Windsor
- William, Prince of Wales (born 1982), eldest son of Charles III and member of the House of Windsor
- William Windsor I (born 2000), a cashmere goat that served as a lance corporal in the British Army
- William Windsor II, a cashmere goat that replaced William Windsor I in the British Army

== See also ==
- Bobby Windsor (born 1948), British rugby union player born Robert William Windsor
- William Winsor (disambiguation)
