= David Corley Jr. =

American gridiron football player and coach (born 1980)

Pittsburgh Steelers
- Title: Assistant quarterbacks coach

Personal information
- Born: April 12, 1980 (age 46); Salisbury, North Carolina, U.S.
- Listed height: 5 ft 11 in (1.80 m)
- Listed weight: 205 lb (93 kg)

Career information
- High school: Fairfield Central HS (Winnsboro, South Carolina)
- College: William & Mary (1999–2002)
- NFL draft: 2003: undrafted

Career history

Playing
- Hamilton Tiger-Cats (2003); New York Dragons (2005); Calgary Stampeders (2006)

Coaching
- C. A. Johnson Preparatory Academy (2004–2005) Quarterbacks coach; William & Mary (2008–2009) Running backs coach; Pittsburgh Steelers (2010) Intern; William & Mary (2010–2012) Quarterbacks coach; Carolina Panthers (2013) Intern; William & Mary (2013) Wide receivers coach; Connecticut (2014) Running backs coach; Connecticut (2015) Wide receivers/Special teams coach; Connecticut (2016) Offensive coordinator/Special teams coach; Army (2017) Wide receivers coach; Penn State (2018) Wide receivers coach; Houston Texans (2019) Intern; South Carolina State (2020) Wide receivers coach; Richmond (2021) Running backs coach; Carolina Panthers (2021) Intern; Pittsburgh Steelers (2022–present) Assistant quarterbacks coach

David Corley Jr. (April 12, 1980) is an American football coach and former quarterback. He played college football at William & Mary and is currently the assistant quarterbacks coach of the Pittsburgh Steelers of the National Football League (NFL).

== Early life ==
Corley Jr. was born in Salisbury, North Carolina, the son of David Sr. and Gail Corley. David played high school football at Fairfield Central High in Winnsboro, South Carolina. In Corley's last two years of high school, Fairfield went 30–0 and won back-to-back state football championships.

== College playing career ==
Corley Jr. played football as a four-year starting Quarterback at NCAA Division I FCS William & Mary from 1999 to 2002. He signed with the Tribe because of coach Jimmye Laycock's reputation for developing quarterbacks, even though Corley was recruited by Clemson, South Carolina, Wake Forest and Georgia Tech. In 2001, throwing for 2,808 yards and 21 touchdowns he led the Tribe to an 8–4 record, Atlantic 10 title and NCAA I-AA Playoff appearance. Corley still holds many all-time records at William and Mary including passing yards (9,805), total yards (10,948) and touchdown passes (73). In 2014 Corley Jr. was elected into the W&M Athletics Hall of Fame.

== Coaching career ==
Corley spent 2004–2005 at the high school level coaching quarterbacks at C.A. Johnson Preparatory Academy in Columbia, South Carolina. Initially hired as the running backs coach for the Nittany Lions, for the 2018 season, Corley was switched to wide receivers coach after the hiring of Ja'Juan Seider, two weeks later. On January 2, 2019, one day after Penn State’s loss to Kentucky in the Citrus Bowl, Corley was relieved of his duties as wide receiver coach for the Nittany Lions.

=== Pittsburgh Steelers ===
On April 19, 2022, the Pittsburgh Steelers hired Corley as their Assistant quarterbacks coach

== Personal ==
Corley graduated from William & Mary in 2002.
