= Robert Windsor =

Robert Windsor may refer to:

- Bob Windsor (born 1942), American football tight end
- Bob Windsor (politician) (1896–1988), Australian politician
- Robert Windsor (American football) (born 1997), American football defensive tackle
- Robert Windsor-Clive (MP) (1824–1859), British politician
- Robert Windsor-Clive, 1st Earl of Plymouth (1857–1923), politician, son of the above
