= Nick Bowers =

American football player (born 1996)

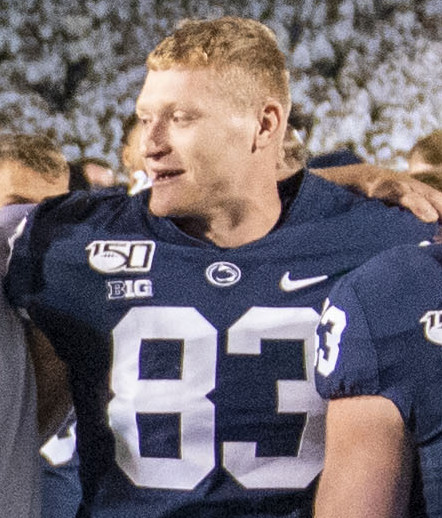
- Bowers with Penn State in 2019

Profile
- Position: Tight end

Personal information
- Born: May 26, 1996 (age 30); Kittanning, Pennsylvania, U.S.
- Listed height: 6 ft 4 in (1.93 m)
- Listed weight: 260 lb (118 kg)

Career information
- High school: Kittanning (Kittanning, Pennsylvania)
- College: Penn State (2015–2019)
- NFL draft: 2020: undrafted

Career history
- Las Vegas Raiders (2020–2021); Cincinnati Bengals (2022–2023)*; Miami Dolphins (2023)*
- * Offseason or practice squad member only
- Stats at Pro Football Reference

Nick Bowers (born May 26, 1996) is an American professional football tight end. He played college football for the Penn State Nittany Lions.

== Early life ==
Bowers attended Kittanning High School and was a four-year letterman. In his senior year, Bowers played wide receiver and caught 32 passes for 503 yards and scored 10 touchdowns. Bowers was a 3-star recruit according to 247Sports.com. He originally committed to Pittsburgh, but decommitted. A day later, he committed to Penn State.

== College career ==
Bowers was redshirted his first true freshman year at Penn State and redshirted his freshman year after sustaining an injury.

As a sophomore, he finished the season with one catch for 15 yards and a touchdown.

As a junior, he finished with a career high of 6 catches for 50 yards and a touchdown. Bowers caught a touchdown in the 2019 Citrus Bowl.

Bowers shined in his senior year at Penn State. He started in 2 games and in total played in 13 games. He caught ten passes for 210 yards and three touchdowns.

== Professional career ==
=== Las Vegas Raiders ===
Bowers went undrafted in the 2020 NFL draft, and signed with the Las Vegas Raiders as an undrafted free agent on May 5, 2020. He was waived during final roster cuts on September 5, 2020, and signed to the team's practice squad the next day. He was placed on the practice squad/COVID-19 list by the team on December 3, 2020, and restored to the practice squad six days later. He signed a reserve/future contract on January 5, 2021.

Bowers made the Raiders 53-man roster in 2021. He played in two games as a special teamer before being placed on injured reserve on October 23, 2021. He was activated on December 20.

On August 28, 2022, Bowers was waived by the Raiders.

=== Cincinnati Bengals ===
On September 1, 2022, the Cincinnati Bengals signed Bowers to their practice squad. Bowers was elevated to the active roster for the Divisional round game against the Buffalo Bills on January 22, 2023. He signed a reserve/future contract on January 31, 2023. Bowers was waived on August 29, 2023.

=== Miami Dolphins ===
On August 31, 2023, Bowers was signed to the Miami Dolphins practice squad. He was not signed to a reserve/future contract after the season and thus became a free agent upon the expiration of his practice squad contract.
