= Mari Winsor =

American fitness instructor (1950–2020)

- Born: March 11, 1950; Marshall, Michigan, U.S.
- Died: April 28, 2020 (aged 70); Sherman Oaks, Los Angeles, California, U.S.
- Education: Michigan State University
- Occupation: Pilates instructor
- Years active: 1990-2016
- Known for: Winsor Pilates founder
- Spouse: Elliot Nachbar

Mari Winsor (March 11, 1950 – April 28, 2020) was an American fitness instructor known for her workout videos, books, and studios popularizing Pilates.

== Career ==
She first worked as a professional dancer, apprenticing at the Alvin Ailey American Dance Theater in New York City, and then worked as a dancer in music videos in the 1980s. She received her Pilates instructor certification from Romana Kryzanowska and founded her own studio in 1990. She credits Pilates with helping her recover from multiple injuries sustained in a 1994 motorcycle accident.

Her self-branded version of Pilates, Winsor Pilates, is notable for its celebrity practitioners and ubiquitous late-night infomercials. Winsor is the author of The Pilates Powerhouse (1999), The Pilates Workout Journal: An Exercise Diary and Conditioning Guide (2001), and The Pilates Pregnancy: Maintaining Strength, Flexibility and Your Figure (2009).

In April 2020, she died from ALS, which she had been diagnosed with in 2013.

== Filmography ==
- Winsor Pilates Series (2002)
- Winsor Pilates Upper Body Sculpting (2002)
- Winsor Pilates Ab Sculpting (2002)
- Winsor Pilates Accelerated Body Sculpting (2002)
- Winsor Pilates Bun & Thigh Sculpting (2002)
- Advanced Body Slimming (2002)
- Winsor Pilates Maximum Burn Super Sculpting & Body Slimming (2003)
- Winsor Pilates Power Sculpting Advanced (2003)
- Winsor Pilates Power Sculpt Bun & Thigh (2003)
- Pilates for Pink Workout (2008)
- Mari Winsor Slimming Pilates Kit (2009)
- Shape 5 Day Jumpstart (2010)
- Mari Winsor Cardio Pilates (2010)
- Mari Winsor Lower Body Pilates (2010)
