= Steven Gonzalez (American football) =

American football player (born 1997)

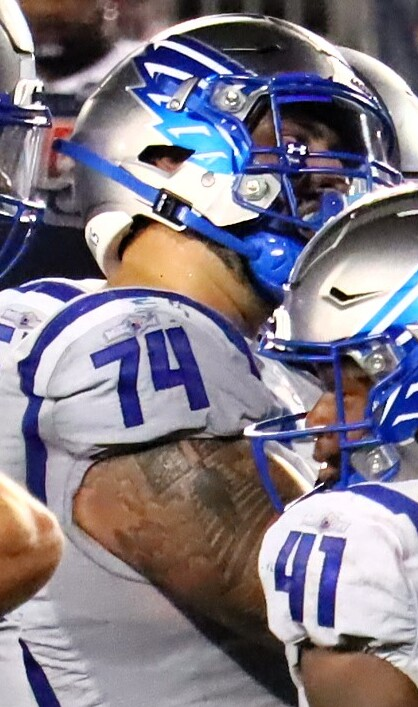
- Gonzalez in 2025

Penn State Nittany Lions
- Title: Recruiting assistant

Personal information
- Born: May 11, 1997 (age 29); Union City, New Jersey, U.S.
- Listed height: 6 ft 4 in (1.93 m)
- Listed weight: 315 lb (143 kg)

Career information
- High school: Union City
- College: Penn State (2015–2019)
- NFL draft: 2020: undrafted

Career history

Playing
- Arizona Cardinals (2020)*; Buffalo Bills (2021)*; St. Louis Battlehawks (2023–2025)
- * Offseason or practice squad member only

Operations
- Penn State (2026–present) Recruiting assistant

Awards and highlights
- All-UFL Team (2025); All-XFL Team (2023); Second-team All-Big Ten (2019)

Steven Jorge Gonzalez (born May 11, 1997) is an American former professional football guard. He played college football at Penn State University. Gonzalez has also played for the Arizona Cardinals and Buffalo Bills of the National Football League (NFL).

== College career ==
Gonzalez played college football at the Penn State University from 2015 to 2019, where he started in 41 games. He earned second-team All-Big Ten honors in 2019.

== Professional career ==
Pre-draft measurables
Height	Weight	Arm length	Hand span
6 ft 3 2/5 in (1.92 m)	332 lb (151 kg)	32 3/4 in (0.83 m)	10 1/8 in (0.26 m)
All values from NFL Scouting Combine/Pro Day

=== Arizona Cardinals ===
After going undrafted in the 2020 NFL draft, Gonzalez signed with the Arizona Cardinals on April 27, 2020. He was released on August 30, 2020.

=== Buffalo Bills ===
On May 13, 2021, Gonzalez signed with the Buffalo Bills. He was released on August 14, 2021.

=== St. Louis Battlehawks ===
On November 16, 2022, Gonzalez was selected by the St. Louis Battlehawks in the 2023 XFL draft. He was named to the All-XFL team in 2023. He re-signed with the team on August 15, 2024. On June 2, 2025 Gonzalez was named to the All-UFL Team.
