= Yetur Gross-Matos =

American football player (born 1998)

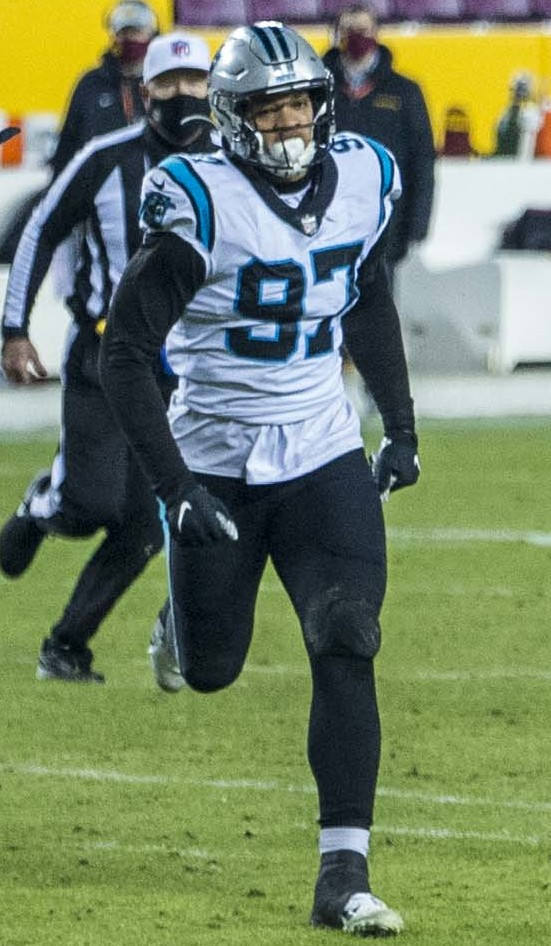
- Gross-Matos with the Carolina Panthers in 2020

Profile
- Position: Defensive end

Personal information
- Born: February 26, 1998 (age 28); Atlantic City, New Jersey, U.S.
- Listed height: 6 ft 5 in (1.96 m)
- Listed weight: 265 lb (120 kg)

Career information
- High school: Chancellor (Fredericksburg, Virginia)
- College: Penn State (2017–2019)
- NFL draft: 2020: 2nd round, 38th overall pick

Career history
- Carolina Panthers (2020–2023); San Francisco 49ers (2024–2025)

Awards and highlights
- 2× First-team All-Big Ten (2018, 2019)

Career NFL statistics as of 2025
- Total tackles: 169
- Sacks: 17
- Forced fumbles: 2
- Fumble recoveries: 4
- Pass deflections: 2
- Stats at Pro Football Reference

Yetur Akkub Gross-Matos (born February 26, 1998) is an American professional football defensive end. He was selected by the Carolina Panthers in the second round of the 2020 NFL draft, and has also played for the San Francisco 49ers of the National Football League (NFL). He played college football for the Penn State Nittany Lions.

== Early life ==
Gross-Matos was born in Atlantic City, New Jersey but grew up in Fredericksburg, Virginia. When Gross-Matos was two years old, his biological father died after a boating accident while trying to rescue Yetur from drowning. When he was 10, his brother died from a lightning strike while they were playing baseball.

Gross-Matos attended Chancellor High School in Spotsylvania County, Virginia. During his high school career, he had 37 sacks. He committed to Pennsylvania State University to play college football.

== College career ==
As a true freshman in 2017, Gross-Matos played in all 13 games and had 17 tackles and 1.5 sacks. As a sophomore in 2018, he started all 13 games and had 54 tackles and eight sacks. After a junior year with 14 tackles for loss and 9.5 sacks, Gross-Matos decided to forgo his senior year and declared for the 2020 NFL draft.

=== College statistics ===
Season	Games	Tackles							Interceptions		Fumbles	
Season	Games	Solo	Asst	Tot	TFL	Yds	Sack	Yds	Int	PD	FF	FR
2017	13	5	12	17	2	8	1.5	7	0	0	0	0
2018	13	36	18	54	20	88	8	58	0	1	2	1
2019	12	24	16	40	15	85	9.5	76	0	1	0	1
Total	38	65	46	111	37	181	19	141	0	2	2	2

== Professional career ==
Pre-draft measurables
Height	Weight	Arm length	Hand span	Wingspan	Vertical jump	Broad jump	Bench press
6 ft 5 in (1.96 m)	266 lb (121 kg)	34 7/8 in (0.89 m)	9 3/4 in (0.25 m)	6 ft 10 1/4 in (2.09 m)	34.0 in (0.86 m)	10 ft 0 in (3.05 m)	20 reps
All values from NFL Combine

=== Carolina Panthers ===
Gross-Matos was selected by the Carolina Panthers with the 38th overall pick in the second round of the 2020 NFL draft. He was the second defensive end taken behind Chase Young.

In Week 4 against the Arizona Cardinals, Gross-Matos recorded his first career sack, a strip sack on Kyler Murray which was recovered by the Panthers, during the 31–21 win. On October 16, 2020, he was placed on injured reserve after suffering an ankle injury in Week 5. He was activated on November 7, prior to Week 9. He was placed on the reserve/COVID-19 list by the team on November 30, and activated on December 10.

On October 24, 2023, Gross-Matos was placed on injured reserve with a hamstring injury. He was activated on December 2. He appeared in 12 games in the 2023 season, recording 4.5 sacks and 36 tackles.

=== San Francisco 49ers ===
On March 14, 2024, Gross-Matos signed a two-year contract with the San Francisco 49ers. On November 16, he was activated from injured reserve. On December 8, Gross-Matos had arguably the best game of his career against the Chicago Bears, recording four tackles and three sacks. He was named NFC Defensive Player of the Week for his performance.

On November 1, 2025, Gross-Matos was placed on injured reserve due to a hip injury. On December 22, Gross-Matos was activated from injured reserve ahead of the team's Week 16 matchup against the Indianapolis Colts.

== NFL career statistics ==
Legend
**Bold**	Career high

=== Regular season ===
Year	Team	Games		Tackles					Interceptions						Fumbles				
Year	Team	GP	GS	Cmb	Solo	Ast	Sck	TFL	Int	Yds	Avg	Lng	TD	PD	FF	Fum	FR	Yds	TD
2020	CAR	12	7	24	9	15	2.5	2	0	0	0.0	0	0	0	**1**	0	0	0	0
2021	CAR	14	2	28	18	10	3.5	5	0	0	0.0	0	0	**1**	**1**	0	0	0	0
2022	CAR	**17**	**17**	**54**	18	**36**	2.5	5	0	0	0.0	0	0	0	0	**1**	**4**	**-2**	0
2023	CAR	12	6	36	**19**	17	**4.5**	**7**	0	0	0.0	0	0	0	0	0	0	0	0
2024	SF	11	0	19	14	5	4.0	6	0	0	0.0	0	0	0	0	0	0	0	0
2025	SF	8	0	8	3	5	0.0	0	0	0	0.0	0	0	**1**	0	0	0	0	0
Career		74	32	169	81	88	17.0	25	0	0	0.0	0	0	2	2	1	4	-2	0

=== Postseason ===
Year	Team	Games		Tackles					Interceptions						Fumbles				
Year	Team	GP	GS	Cmb	Solo	Ast	Sck	TFL	Int	Yds	Avg	Lng	TD	PD	FF	Fum	FR	Yds	TD
2025	SF	2	0	2	0	2	0.0	0	0	0	0.0	0	0	0	0	0	0	0	0
Career		2	0	2	0	2	0.0	0	0	0	0.0	0	0	0	0	0	0	0	0
