= Frederick Winsor =

Frederick Winsor may refer to:

- Frederick Albert Winsor (1763–1830), German inventor
- Frederick Winsor (surgeon) (1829–1889), American surgeon

== See also ==
- Lord Frederick Windsor (born 1979), British financial analyst
