= William Winsor =

William Winsor may refer to:

- William C. Winsor (1876–1963), Newfoundland politician
- William Winsor (banker) (1819–1904), American banker

== See also ==
- William Windsor (disambiguation)
- William Winsor School, Smithfield, Rhode Island, United States
