= Kevin Givens =

American football player (born 1997)

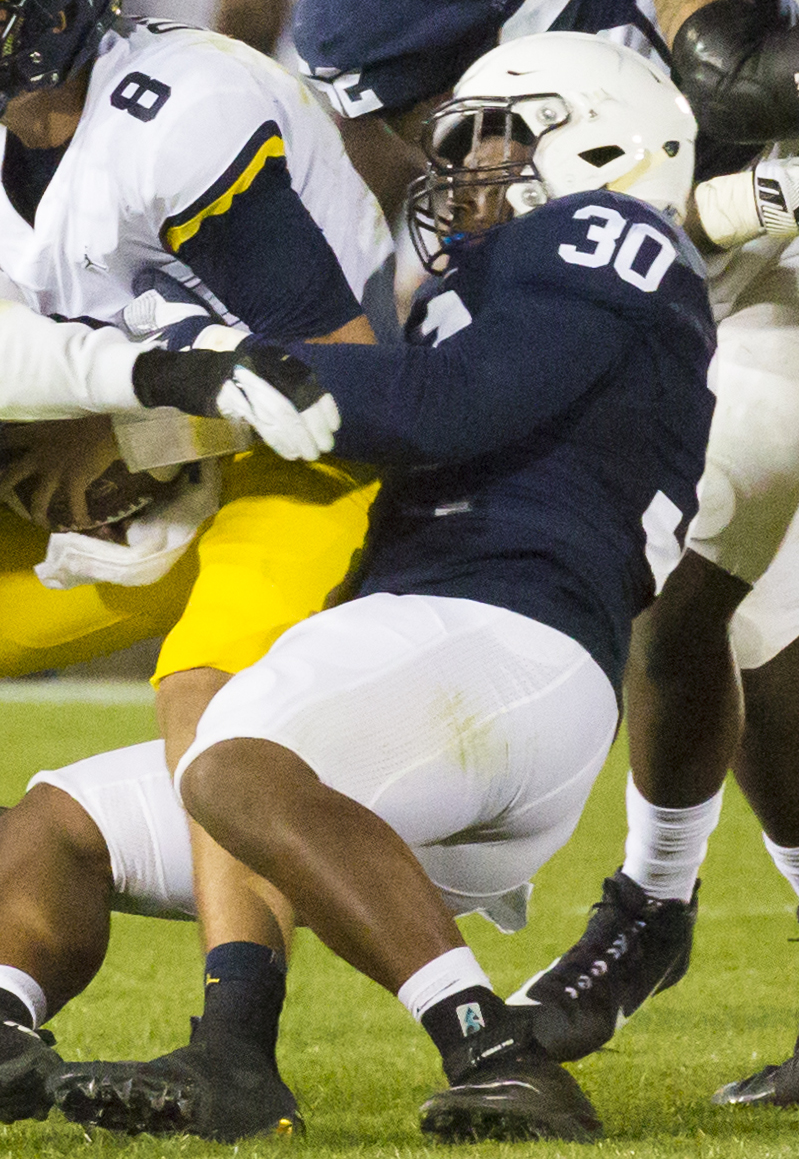
- Givens with the Penn State Nittany Lions in 2017

No. 74 – Indianapolis Colts
- Position: Defensive tackle
- Roster status: Active

Personal information
- Born: March 1, 1997 (age 29); Altoona, Pennsylvania, U.S.
- Listed height: 6 ft 1 in (1.85 m)
- Listed weight: 285 lb (129 kg)

Career information
- High school: Altoona (PA)
- College: Penn State (2015–2018)
- NFL draft: 2019: undrafted

Career history
- San Francisco 49ers (2019–2026); Indianapolis Colts (2026–present)

Career NFL statistics as of 2025
- Total tackles: 92
- Sacks: 8.0
- Forced fumbles: 1
- Fumble recoveries: 2
- Pass deflections: 3
- Stats at Pro Football Reference

Kevin Givens (born March 1, 1997) is an American professional football defensive tackle for the Indianapolis Colts of the National Football League (NFL). He played college football for the Penn State Nittany Lions.

== Early life ==
Givens was born in Newark, New Jersey, and grew up in Altoona, Pennsylvania. He attended Altoona Area High School, where he played defensive end and fullback on the football team. As a senior he was named first-team All-State on defense and rushed for 317 yards and six touchdowns on offense.

== College career ==
Givens was a member of the Penn State Nittany Lions for five seasons, redshirting his true freshman season. He was named the Big Ten Conference All-Freshman team after making 26 tackles, seven tackles for loss and 4.5 sacks in his first season. As a redshirt sophomore, Givens recorded 23 tackles with four tackles for loss, 3.5 sacks, a forced fumble and a fumble recovery. Givens finished his redshirt junior season with 33 tackles, 10.5 tackles for loss and five sacks. After the season Givens, who had already completed his undergraduate degree, announced that he would forgo his final season in order to enter the 2019 NFL draft.

== Professional career ==
Pre-draft measurables
Height	Weight	Arm length	Hand span	Wingspan	40-yard dash	10-yard split	20-yard split	20-yard shuttle	Three-cone drill	Vertical jump	Broad jump	Bench press
6 ft 1 1/4 in (1.86 m)	285 lb (129 kg)	32 1/8 in (0.82 m)	9 5/8 in (0.24 m)	6 ft 4 3/8 in (1.94 m)	5.08 s	1.81 s	2.75 s	4.62 s	7.63 s	31.0 in (0.79 m)	9 ft 7 in (2.92 m)	32 reps
All values from NFL Combine

=== San Francisco 49ers ===
Givens signed with the San Francisco 49ers as an undrafted free agent on April 28, 2019. He was waived at the end of training camp during final roster cuts, but was re-signed to the team's practice squad on September 1. The 49ers promoted Givens to the active roster on December 28. Givens reached Super Bowl LIV with the 49ers, who were defeated by the Kansas City Chiefs by a score of 31–20.

In Week 7 against the New England Patriots in 2020, Givens recorded his first career sack on Jarrett Stidham late in the fourth quarter during the 33–6 win. Givens was placed on a roster exemption on December 12, 2020, and was reinstated to the active roster five days later.

On September 25, 2021, Givens was placed on injured reserve due to an ankle injury. He was activated on October 30.

On March 10, 2022, Givens re-signed with the 49ers.

Over the course of the 2022 and 2023 seasons, Givens appeared in 30 regular season games, starting 12 of them. During that period, he appeared in six playoff games, including a Super Bowl appearance against the Kansas City Chiefs.

On March 14, 2024, Givens re-signed with the 49ers. In eight games (including one start) for San Francisco, he posted 11 combined tackles and 3 1/2 sacks. On December 4, Givens was placed on injured reserve after suffering a pectoral tear in Week 13.

On March 11, 2025, Givens re-signed with the 49ers. He was placed on injured reserve to begin the season due to a pectoral injury suffered in the preseason. Givens was activated on October 18, ahead of San Francisco's Week 7 matchup against the Atlanta Falcons.

On July 26, 2026, Givens re-signed with the 49ers. On August 5, he was waived by San Francisco. On September 1, Givens re–signed with the team's practice squad. On October 24, Givens was released by the 49ers and re-sgined three days later.

=== Indianapolis Colts ===
On October 30, 2026, Givens was signed by the Indianapolis Colts off of the 49ers' practice squad.

== NFL career statistics ==
Legend
**Bold**	Career high

=== Regular season ===
Year	Team	Games		Tackles					Interceptions						Fumbles				
Year	Team	GP	GS	Cmb	Solo	Ast	Sck	TFL	Int	Yds	Avg	Lng	TD	PD	FF	Fum	FR	Yds	TD
2019	SF	1	0	1	1	0	0.0	0	0	0	0.0	0	0	0	0	0	0	0	0
2020	SF	13	1	19	**14**	5	1.0	5	0	0	0.0	0	0	**1**	0	0	**1**	0	0
2021	SF	13	0	17	7	**10**	0.0	1	0	0	0.0	0	0	0	**1**	0	0	0	0
2022	SF	13	**11**	20	11	9	2.0	**7**	0	0	0.0	0	0	**1**	0	0	0	0	0
2023	SF	**17**	1	**22**	12	**10**	1.5	3	0	0	0.0	0	0	**1**	0	0	**1**	0	0
2024	SF	8	1	11	6	5	**3.5**	2	0	0	0.0	0	0	0	0	0	0	0	0
2025	SF	5	0	2	1	1	0.0	0	0	0	0.0	0	0	0	0	0	0	0	0
Career		70	14	92	52	40	8.0	18	0	0	0.0	0	0	3	1	0	2	0	0

=== Postseason ===
Year	Team	Games		Tackles					Interceptions						Fumbles				
Year	Team	GP	GS	Cmb	Solo	Ast	Sck	TFL	Int	Yds	Avg	Lng	TD	PD	FF	Fum	FR	Yds	TD
2021	SF	**3**	0	**6**	1	**5**	**0.5**	0	0	0	0.0	0	0	**1**	0	0	0	0	0
2022	SF	**3**	0	4	**2**	2	0.0	0	0	0	0.0	0	0	0	0	0	0	0	0
2023	SF	**3**	0	2	**2**	0	0.0	0	0	0	0.0	0	0	0	0	0	0	0	0
Career		9	0	12	5	7	0.5	0	0	0	0.0	0	0	1	0	0	0	0	0
