= Richard Windsor =

American explorer

Richard Windsor (dates unknown) served the Lewis and Clark Expedition and Corps of Discovery as a hunter, scout, and woodsman.

Windsor was recruited at Kaskaskia in 1803, joining the party as a Private at Camp Dubois, January 1, 1804. Windsor was a great hunter and woodsmen and he was very beneficial to the expedition. He is mentioned in the Lewis and Clark journals for an accident that almost cost him his life. Crossing a bluff when he was with Lewis, he slipped and fell. Lewis ran to the edge and told him to dig his knife in and climb up. He did so, and escaped death. After the expedition, Windsor settled in Missouri but soon rejoined the army and served until 1819. He later lived along the Sangamon River in Illinois.
