= Shareef Miller =

American football player (born 1997)

No. 51, 58
- Position: Linebacker

Personal information
- Born: March 14, 1997 (age 29); Philadelphia, Pennsylvania, U.S.
- Listed height: 6 ft 4 in (1.93 m)
- Listed weight: 255 lb (116 kg)

Career information
- High school: George Washington (Philadelphia)
- College: Penn State (2015–2018)
- NFL draft: 2019: 4th round, 138th overall pick

Career history
- Philadelphia Eagles (2019); Carolina Panthers (2020); Philadelphia Eagles (2020)*; Arizona Cardinals (2021)*; Atlanta Falcons (2021)*; New Orleans Breakers (2022); Seattle Sea Dragons (2023)
- * Offseason or practice squad member only
- Stats at Pro Football Reference

Shareef Abdul Miller (born March 14, 1997) is an American former professional football linebacker. He played college football at Penn State and was selected by the Philadelphia Eagles in the fourth round of the 2019 NFL draft.

== Early life ==
A 3 star recruit, Miller held offers from 26 different schools, including Florida, Miami (FL), Nebraska, Oregon, and Tennessee among others. On January 25, 2015, he committed to Penn State.

College recruiting
Name	Hometown	School	Height	Weight	Commit date
Shareef Miller; DE	Philadelphia, PA	George Washington, Philadelphia, PA	6 ft 5 in (1.96 m)	230 lb (100 kg)	Jan 25, 2015
Shareef Miller; DE	Recruit ratings: Scout: Rivals: 247Sports: (86)				
Overall recruit ranking: 247Sports: 525, 12 (PA), 27 (DE)
Note: In many cases, Scout, Rivals, 247Sports, On3, and ESPN may conflict in their listings of height and weight.; In these cases, the average was taken. ESPN grades are on a 100-point scale.; Sources:

== College career ==
=== Statistics ===
Year	G	Tackles	TFL	Sacks	FF	FR
2015	0	0	0	0	0	0
2016	9	22	5	1.5	1	0
2017	13	37	11.5	5.5	0	1
2018	12	41	15	7.5	0	1
Total	34	100	31.5	14.5	1	2

== Professional career ==
Pre-draft measurables
Height	Weight	Arm length	Hand span	40-yard dash	10-yard split	20-yard split	20-yard shuttle	Vertical jump	Bench press
6 ft 4 1/2 in (1.94 m)	254 lb (115 kg)	33 5/8 in (0.85 m)	10 1/8 in (0.26 m)	4.69 s	1.64 s	2.75 s	4.45 s	29.5 in (0.75 m)	17 reps
All values from NFL Combine/Pro Day

=== Philadelphia Eagles (first stint) ===
Miller was selected by the Philadelphia Eagles in the fourth round (138th overall) of the 2019 NFL draft. On September 5, 2020, Miller was waived by the Eagles before the start of the 2020 season.

=== Carolina Panthers ===
On September 6, 2020, Miller was claimed off waivers by the Carolina Panthers. He was waived on October 3, 2020.

=== Philadelphia Eagles (second stint) ===
The Eagles signed Miller to their practice squad on October 19, 2020. He was released on December 1, 2020.

=== Arizona Cardinals ===
On January 6, 2021, Miller signed a reserve/future contract with the Arizona Cardinals. He was waived on June 7, 2021.

=== Atlanta Falcons ===
On June 17, 2021, Miller signed with the Atlanta Falcons. On August 24, the Falcons released Miller.

=== New Orleans Breakers ===
On March 10, 2022, Miller was drafted by the New Orleans Breakers of the United States Football League. He was transferred to the team's inactive roster on May 12 with a hamstring injury. He was moved back to the active roster on May 21.

=== Seattle Sea Dragons ===
The Seattle Sea Dragons of the XFL selected Miller in the fourth round of the 2023 XFL Supplemental Draft on January 1, 2023. He was released on August 17, 2023.
