= Ryan Bates =

American football player (born 1997)

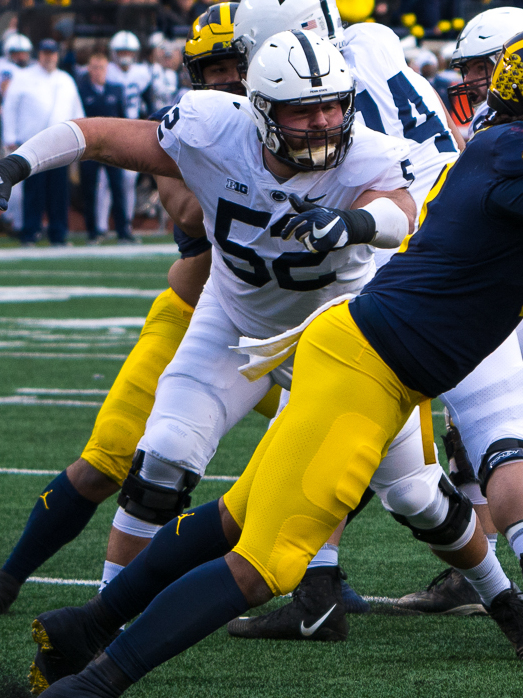
- Bates with the Penn State Nittany Lions in 2018

Profile
- Position: Center

Personal information
- Born: February 14, 1997 (age 29); Warminster, Pennsylvania, U.S.
- Listed height: 6 ft 4 in (1.93 m)
- Listed weight: 306 lb (139 kg)

Career information
- High school: Archbishop Wood (Warminster)
- College: Penn State (2015–2018)
- NFL draft: 2019: undrafted

Career history
- Philadelphia Eagles (2019)*; Buffalo Bills (2019–2023); Chicago Bears (2024–2025)
- * Offseason or practice squad member only

Awards and highlights
- 2× Third-team All-Big Ten (2017, 2018)

Career NFL statistics as of 2025
- Games played: 92
- Games started: 21
- Stats at Pro Football Reference

Ryan William Bates (born February 14, 1997) is an American professional football center. He played college football for the Penn State Nittany Lions.

== Early life ==
Bates and his sister Anna were two children born to Theresa Strocen-Bates and Norman Bates. Bates attended Archbishop Wood Catholic High School in Warminster Township, Pennsylvania. He played offensive tackle with the Archbishop Wood Vikings whom he helped win the 2013 PIAA Class AAA Championship finishing with a 13–2 record. This earned him first team all-state selection honors for the 2013 season. Bates and the Vikings won the PIAA Class AAA Championship for a consecutive time during the 2014 season. He was also named to the First-team All-Philadelphia Catholic League in 2013 and 2014. In his junior season Bates was named the 2014 Pennsylvania Football News Lineman of the Year. Bates also earned Under Armour All-America Game selection honors during his senior season in 2015 while also serving as co-captain. Both 247Sports and Rivals.com rated Bates a four-star recruit. He received numerous recruitment offers from universities including Virginia, Temple, Rutgers, Pittsburgh, Ohio State, Miami, Maryland, Duke, Boston College, Auburn, Georgia Tech, Illinois, South Carolina and Penn State.

== College career ==
Bates committed to Penn State. After his true freshman season in 2015, Bates joined the field for the 2016 season as a redshirt freshman. During this season, Bates started in all 14 games, playing the positions of offensive lineman, left guard and left tackle. He earned various Big Ten honors along with All-American and Team of the Week honors during the 2016 season. During his sophomore season in 2017, Bates started 8 of 10 games as a left tackle. After sustaining an injury, Bates sat out games against Michigan State, Rutgers and Nebraska. During his junior season in 2018, Bates earned third-team All-Big Ten and Big Ten Teams of the Week honors. While at Penn State, Bates graduated with a degree in Labor and Employment Relations.

== Professional career ==
Pre-draft measurables
Height	Weight	Arm length	Hand span	40-yard dash	10-yard split	20-yard split	20-yard shuttle	Three-cone drill	Vertical jump	Broad jump	Bench press
6 ft 4 1/2 in (1.94 m)	306 lb (139 kg)	32 1/2 in (0.83 m)	9 1/2 in (0.24 m)	5.09 s	1.69 s	2.88 s	4.53 s	7.45 s	27.0 in (0.69 m)	8 ft 6 in (2.59 m)	28 reps
All values from NFL Combine

=== Philadelphia Eagles ===
Bates signed with the Philadelphia Eagles as an undrafted free agent on May 10, 2019.

=== Buffalo Bills ===
On August 9, 2019, Bates was traded to the Buffalo Bills for linebacker Eli Harold.

Bates made his first career start in Week 16 of the 2021 season at right guard, and started the remainder of the season and through the playoffs at left guard.

On March 14, 2022, the Bills placed a restricted free agent tender on Bates. On March 24, 2022, the Chicago Bears signed Bates to an offer sheet, but Buffalo matched the offer. On April 4, 2022, the Bills signed Bates to a four-year $17 million contract.

=== Chicago Bears ===
On March 4, 2024, Bates was traded to the Chicago Bears for a 2024 fifth-round pick. He was placed on injured reserve on September 14. He was activated on November 9.
