= DeAndre Thompkins =

American football player (born 1995)

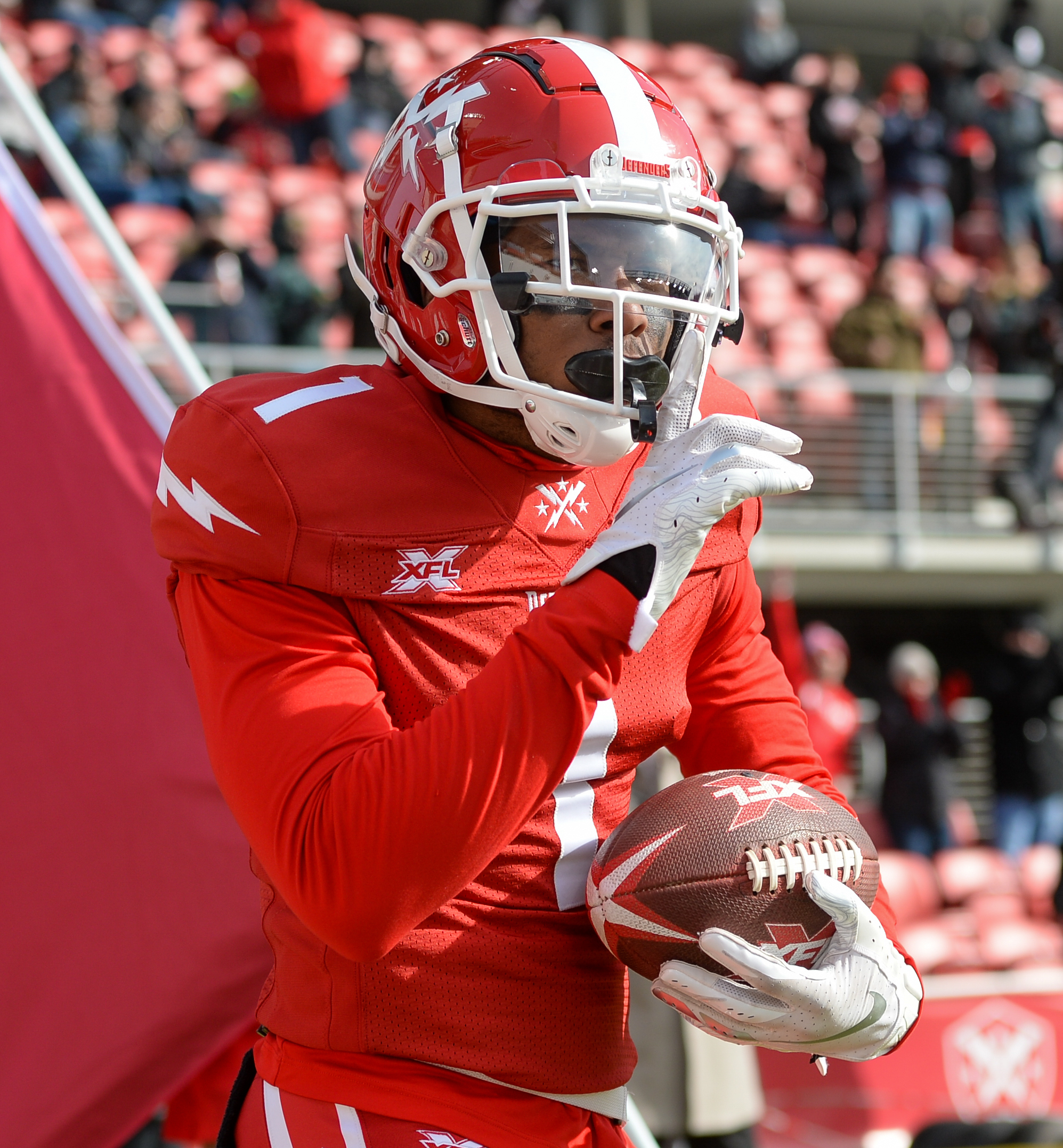
- Thompkins with the DC Defenders in 2020

No. 1
- Position: Wide receiver

Personal information
- Born: October 1, 1995 (age 31); Pensacola, Florida, U.S.
- Listed height: 6 ft 0 in (1.83 m)
- Listed weight: 188 lb (85 kg)

Career information
- High school: Swansboro
- College: Penn State
- NFL draft: 2019: undrafted

Career history
- Philadelphia Eagles (2019)*; DC Defenders (2020); Pittsburgh Steelers (2020)*; Green Bay Packers (2021)*
- * Offseason or practice squad member only

Awards and highlights
- Second-team All-Big Ten (2017)

DeAndre Lewis Thompkins (born October 1, 1995) is an American former football wide receiver. He played college football at Penn State.

== Professional career ==
=== Philadelphia Eagles ===
Thompkins was signed by the Philadelphia Eagles as an undrafted free agent following the 2019 NFL draft. He received $85,000 guaranteed if he signed. He was cut on August 30, 2019.

=== DC Defenders ===
Thompkins was selected in the 4th round of the 2020 XFL draft by the DC Defenders. Thompkins made his XFL debut in Week 2 against the New York Guardians, recording 6 catches for 67 yards and a touchdown. He had his contract terminated when the league suspended operations on April 10, 2020.

Thompkins had a tryout with the New York Jets on August 19, 2020.

=== Pittsburgh Steelers ===
Thompkins was signed by the Pittsburgh Steelers on August 30, 2020, but then switched over to Green Bay in 2021.

=== Green Bay Packers ===
On May 26, 2021, Thompkins signed with the Green Bay Packers. He was placed on injured reserve on August 16, 2021. He was released on August 25.
