= Ja'Juan Seider =

American football player and coach (born 1977)

Current position
- Title: Associate head coach, running backs coach
- Team: Notre Dame
- Conference: Independent

Biographical details
- Born: April 16, 1977 (age 49); Belle Glade, Florida, U.S.
- Education: West Virginia University

Playing career
- 1995–1998: West Virginia
- 1999: Florida A&M
- Position: Quarterback

Coaching career (HC unless noted)
- 2001–2002: Glades Central HS (FL) (RB)
- 2003–2005: Palm Beach Lakes HS (FL) (OC)
- 2006–2007: Lake Worth HS (FL) (QB)
- 2008–2009: West Virginia (GA)
- 2010–2012: Marshall (RB)
- 2013–2016: West Virginia (RB)
- 2017: Florida (RB)
- 2018–2021: Penn State (RB)
- 2022–2023: Penn State (co-OC/RB)
- 2024: Penn State (AHC/co-OC/RB)
- 2025–present: Notre Dame (AHC/RB)

Accomplishments and honors

Awards
- MEAC Offensive Player of the Year (1999); First-team All-MEAC (1999)

Ja'Juan Seider (born April 16, 1977) is an American football coach and former quarterback who is the associate head coach and running back coach of the Notre Dame Fighting Irish. He has previously coached for the Marshall Thundering Herd, West Virginia Mountaineers, Florida Gators, and Penn State Nittany Lions. He played college football for the West Virginia Mountaineers and Florida A&M Rattlers and was selected in the sixth round of the 2000 NFL draft by the San Diego Chargers.

== Early life ==
A native of Belle Glade, Florida, Seider was an All-District quarterback at Glades Central High School. After his senior season, Seider would accept a scholarship to play college football at West Virginia University.

== College playing career ==
After spending four years as a backup quarterback at West Virginia University, Seider transferred to Florida A&M for his senior season to play for head coach Billy Joe.

== Coaching career ==
=== Early coaching career ===
Seider's first coaching job would be at his high school alma mater, Glades Central High School coaching running backs in 2001 and 2002. He would spend the next two seasons as offensive coordinator at Palm Beach Lakes High. The following two seasons he would spend at Lake Worth Community High School coaching quarterbacks. Seider would join Bill Stewart’s Mountaineer staff as a graduate assistant in 2008 and 2009.

=== Marshall ===
Marshall’s Doc Holliday hired him away to serve as running backs coach and recruiting coordinator from 2010 to 2012.

=== West Virginia ===
In 2013, Seider was hired by head coach Dana Holgorsen as the running backs coach for the West Virginia Mountaineers. Seider would spend four seasons with the Mountaineers, and would produce 1,000-yard rushers three of the four years. Charles Sims amassed 1,095 yards and 11 touchdowns on the ground in 2013, and the Tampa Bay Buccaneers selected him 69th overall in the third round of the 2014 NFL draft. Wendell Smallwood followed suit in 2015, recording 1,519 yards (tops in the Big 12) and nine touchdowns and was selected 150th overall in the fifth round of the 2016 NFL draft by the Philadelphia Eagles. In 2016, Justin Crawford led West Virginia in the rushing with 1,184 yards, good for third in the Big 12.

=== Florida ===
In 2017, Seider was hired by the Florida Gators and head coach Jim McElwain as the running backs coach. Seider would only spend one season at Florida after McElwain was fired and replaced by Dan Mullen. Seider was retained by Coach Mullen to coach tight ends, but chose to weigh other coaching options.

=== Penn State ===
On January 25, 2018, Penn State head coach James Franklin announced Ja'Juan Seider as the Nittany Lions’ running backs coach. The Nittany Lions rushed for 204.9 yards per game. This was the highest per game total since 2008, when Penn State rushed for 205.8. Sanders, who rushed for 1,274 yards and nine touchdowns, was selected in the second round (53rd overall) by the Philadelphia Eagles in 2019 NFL draft.

During the middle of the 2023 season, Seider was promoted to interim co-offensive coordinator for the remainder of the season.
