= Robert Windsor (American football) =

American football player (born 1997)

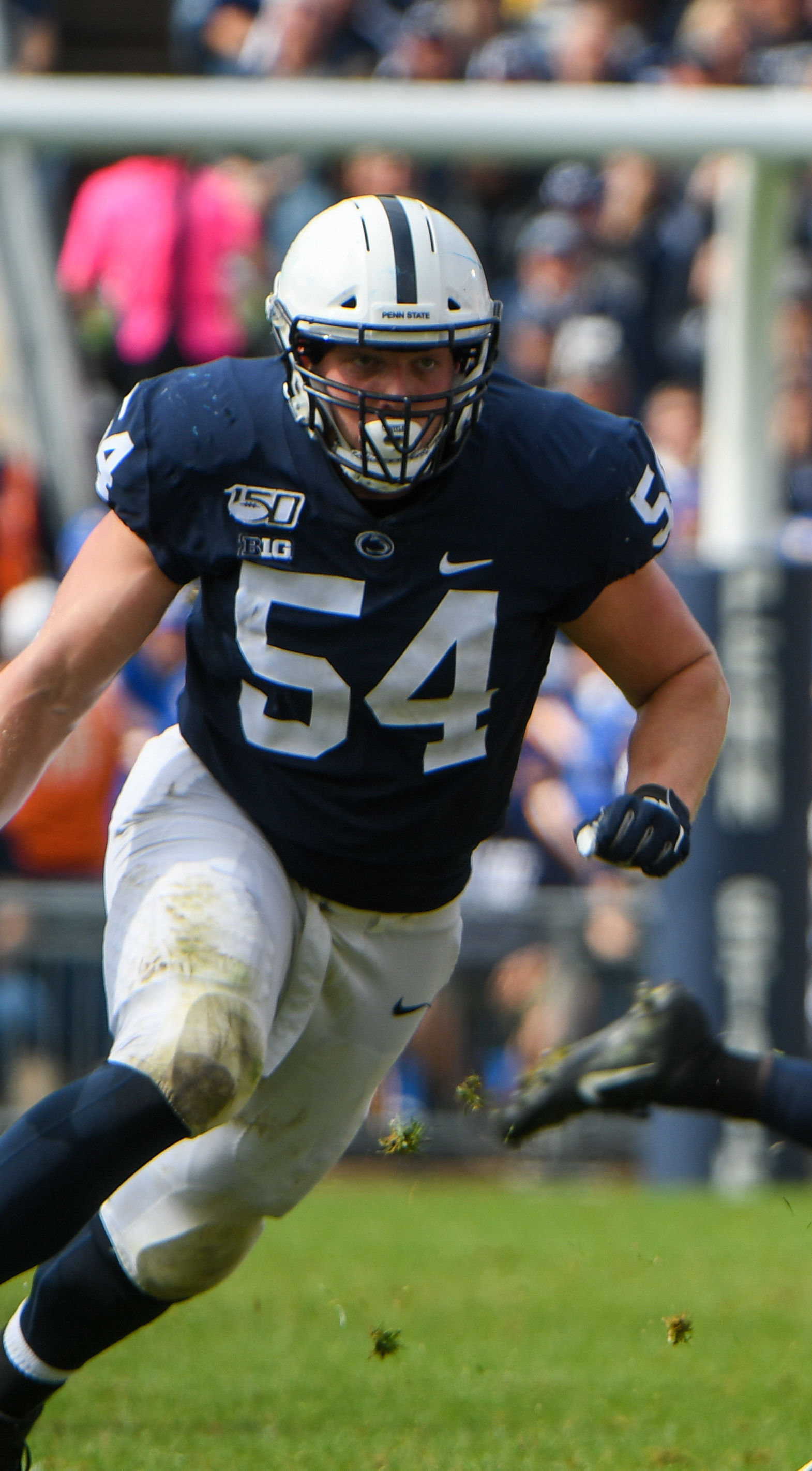
- Windsor with the Penn State Nittany Lions in 2019

No. 93
- Position: Defensive tackle

Personal information
- Born: January 15, 1997 (age 29); Fond du Lac, Wisconsin, U.S.
- Listed height: 6 ft 4 in (1.93 m)
- Listed weight: 290 lb (132 kg)

Career information
- High school: Fond du Lac
- College: Penn State (2015–2019)
- NFL draft: 2020: 6th round, 193rd overall pick

Career history
- Indianapolis Colts (2020–2021); Vegas Vipers (2023); DC Defenders (2024)*
- * Offseason or practice squad member only

Awards and highlights
- Second-team All-Big Ten (2019)

Career NFL statistics
- Total tackles: 2
- Stats at Pro Football Reference

Robert Browning Windsor (born January 15, 1997) is an American former professional football player who was a defensive tackle for the Indianapolis Colts of the National Football League (NFL). He played college football for the Penn State Nittany Lions.

== College career ==
After playing at Fond du Lac High School in Fond du Lac, Wisconsin, Windsor chose Penn State. He committed to Penn State on January 25, 2015, choosing Penn State over other Big Ten schools Wisconsin, Illinois, Minnesota, Maryland and Purdue, who all extended scholarship offers.

During his junior season, Windsor recorded 7.5 sacks. He missed the 2020 Citrus Bowl due to an unspecified violation of team rules.

Prior to his senior season, Windsor was named to the Outland Trophy watchlist. After taking stock of what he deemed a lackluster season part of the way through, Windsor recorded 2.5 sacks against Iowa, with teammates praising him for his work ethic and sacrifices. After his senior season, Windsor was named second-team All-Big Ten Conference.

He also took part in the 2020 Senior Bowl and 2020 NFL Combine.

== Professional career ==
Pre-draft measurables
Height	Weight	Arm length	Hand span	40-yard dash	20-yard shuttle	Three-cone drill	Vertical jump	Broad jump	Bench press
6 ft 4 1/2 in (1.94 m)	290 lb (132 kg)	33 1/8 in (0.84 m)	9 7/8 in (0.25 m)	4.90 s	4.44 s	7.47 s	28.5 in (0.72 m)	9 ft 3 in (2.82 m)	21 reps
All values from NFL Combine

=== Indianapolis Colts ===
Windsor was selected by the Indianapolis Colts of the National Football League (NFL) in the sixth round (193rd overall) of the 2020 NFL draft. He was waived on September 5, 2020, and signed to the practice squad the next day. He was elevated to the active roster on November 21 and 28 for the team's weeks 11 and 12 games against the Green Bay Packers and Tennessee Titans, and reverted to the practice squad after each game. He was placed on the practice squad/COVID-19 list by the team on December 24, 2020, and restored to the practice squad on December 29. On January 10, 2021, Windsor signed a reserve/futures contract with the Colts.

On July 25, 2021, Windsor was placed on injured reserve.

On April 7, 2022, Windsor officially retired from the NFL, citing injuries and delays in his rehabilitation as the main reason.

=== Vegas Vipers ===
Windsor was drafted by the Vegas Vipers in the 2023 XFL draft. He was placed on the team's reserve list on April 18, 2023. He was waived in June 2023.

=== DC Defenders ===
On June 23, 2023, Windsor was claimed off waivers by the DC Defenders. He was not part of the roster after the 2024 UFL dispersal draft on January 15, 2024.

== Personal life ==
Windsor previously graduated from Penn State with a degree in telecommunications and started a media studies degree in his redshirt senior year.
