= List of Penn State Nittany Lions in the NFL draft =

This is a list of Penn State Nittany Lions football players in the NFL draft.

== Key ==
= Pro Bowler
= AFL All-Star
= Hall of Famer

B	Back	K	Kicker	T	Tackle
C	Center	LB	Linebacker	FB	Fullback
DB	Defensive back	CB	Cornerback	S	Safety
DE	Defensive end	QB	Quarterback	WR	Wide receiver
DT	Defensive tackle	RB	Running back	G	Guard
E	End	OT	Offensive tackle	TE	Tight end

== Players ==
Year	Round	Pick	Overall	Team	Name	Position
1940	16	2	142	Steelers	Leon Gajecki	C
1941	9	2	72	Cardinals	Tom Vargo	E
1941	12	1	101	Eagles	John Patrick	B
1941	19	6	176	Giants	Chuck Peters	B
1941	20	3	183	Cardinals	Frank Platt	T
1942	12	8	108	Giants	Len Krouse	B
1942	16	3	143	Eagles	Bill Smaltz	B
1943	7	6	56	Giants	Lou Palazzi	C
1943	18	3	163	Dodgers	Ken Schoonover	T
1943	29	10	280	Redskins	Johnny Jaffurs	G
1944	10	2	89	Dodgers	Aldo Cenci	B
1946	4	3	28	Steelers	Joe Tepsic	B
1946	14	2	122	Yanks	Ralph Ventresco	B
1946	20	3	183	Steelers	Mike Garbinski	B
1946	27	3	253	Steelers	Marchi Marino	T
1947	14	3	118	Steelers	Bill Moore	T
1947	16	5	140	Eagles	Jeff Durkota	B
1947	26	5	240	Cardinals	Larry Joe	B
1947	30	4	279	Redskins	Joe Colone	B
1948	3	1	14	Yanks	John Nolan	T
1948	5	1	26	Giants	Johnny Wolosky	C
1948	21	7	192	Eagles	Negley Norton	T
1949	6	10	61	Yanks	Sam Tamburo	E
1949	9	1	82	Lions	Chuck Drazenovich	LB
1949	19	1	182	Lions	Wallace Triplett	RB
1949	20	3	194	Packers	Larry Cooney	B
1950	3	11	38	Rams	Don Murray	T
1950	8	8	100	Steelers	Fran Rogel	FB
1950	13	7	168	Steelers	Negley Norton	T
1950	22	3	277	Packers	Chuck Beatty	C
1952	17	11	204	Browns	Stew Sheets	T
1953	11	7	128	Eagles	Bob Pollard	B
1953	17	7	200	Eagles	Tony Rados	B
1953	18	2	207	Cardinals	Joe Yukica	E
1953	26	12	313	Lions	Jim Dooley	C
1953	28	8	333	Eagles	Joe Gratson	B
1954	26	3	271	Steelers	Joe Pascarella	T
1955	3	6	31	Giants	Rosey Grier	DT
1955	10	3	112	Rams	Jesse Arnelle	E
1955	18	2	207	Redskins	Don Bailey	B
1955	29	9	346	49ers	Otto Kniedinger	T
1956	1	9	9	Colts	Lenny Moore	RB
1956	14	4	161	Eagles	Frank Reich	C
1957	2	4	17	Browns	Milt Plum	QB
1957	17	1	194	Eagles	Dan Radakovich	C
1958	4	11	48	Colts	Les Walters	E
1958	10	6	115	Rams	Al Jacks	QB
1958	14	5	162	Redskins	Jack Farls	E
1959	5	2	50	Cardinals	Maury Schleicher	E
1960	1	4	4	Redskins	Richie Lucas	QB
1960	3	4	28	Redskins	Andy Stynchula	T
1960	5	1	49	Rams	Charley Janerette	T
1960	8	3	87	Redskins	Earl Kohlhaas	G
1961	3	2	30	Cowboys	Stew Barber	G
1961	7	3	87	Redskins	Jim Kerr	S
1961	7	6	90	Steelers	Dick Hoak	RB
1961	13	14	182	Eagles	Don Jonas	QB
1961	19	14	266	Eagles	Dick Wilson	C
1962	2	9	23	Colts	Bill Saul	LB
1962	3	1	29	Redskins	Robert Mitinger	LB
1962	4	4	46	49ers	Chuck Sieminski	T
1962	4	5	46	Cardinals	Roger Kochman	RB
1962	5	4	60	Rams	Jim Smith	T
1962	12	12	166	Giants	Al Gursky	RB
1962	14	13	195	Eagles	Jim Schawb	E
1963	1	14	14	Packers	Dave Robinson	LB
1963	4	4	46	49ers	Hatch Rosdahl	DT
1963	6	9	79	Rams	Terry Monaghan	T
1963	8	5	103	Colts	Dave Hayes	B
1963	10	4	130	Eagles	Pete Liske	QB
1963	17	9	233	Browns	Dick Anderson	E
1964	3	10	38	Steelers	Ralph Baker	LB
1964	13	12	180	Giants	John Delbert	T
1964	14	4	186	Redskins	Tom Urbank	B
1965	3	8	36	Colts	Glenn Ressler	G
1966	8	6	116	Cowboys	Don Kunit	RB
1966	8	15	125	Colts	Jack White	QB
1966	20	1	291	Falcons	Bob Riggle	DB
1967	2	27	53	Saints	Dave Rowe	DT
1967	10	20	257	Patriots	John Runnels	LB
1967	16	22	415	Bills	Mike Irwin	RB
1968	2	14	41	Giants	Rich Buzin	OT
1968	2	16	43	Chargers	Bill Lenkaitis	C
1968	5	8	119	Bills	Mike McBath	DE
1969	1	7	7	49ers	Ted Kwalick	TE
1969	2	12	38	Packers	Rich Moore	DT
1969	4	4	82	Steelers	Bob Campbell	RB
1969	7	18	174	Dolphins	John Kulka	G
1969	15	3	367	Eagles	Leon Angevine	WR
1970	1	7	7	Bengals	Mike Reid	DT
1970	3	6	58	Cardinals	Charlie Pittman	RB
1970	3	20	72	Jets	Dennis Onkotz	LB
1970	4	17	95	Colts	Steve Smear	DT
1970	4	20	98	Jets	John Ebersole	LB
1970	7	23	179	Cowboys	Don Abbey	LB
1970	8	17	199	Redskins	Paul Johnson	DB
1970	12	17	303	Redskins	James Kates	LB
1971	2	8	34	Steelers	Jack Ham	LB
1971	3	21	73	Raiders	Warren Koegel	C
1971	11	22	282	Dolphins	Vic Surma	T
1971	16	23	413	Vikings	Greg Edmonds	WR
1972	1	13	13	Steelers	Franco Harris	FB
1972	2	22	48	Colts	Lydell Mitchell	RB
1972	4	15	93	Cowboys	Chuck Zapiec	LB
1972	5	13	117	Bears	Bob Parsons	TE
1973	3	19	71	Lions	Jim Laslavic	LB
1973	5	12	116	Jets	Bruce Bannon	LB
1973	6	6	136	Bills	John Skorupan	LB
1973	14	10	348	Broncos	John Hufnagel	QB
1973	15	17	381	Giants	Carl Schaukowitch	G
1974	1	8	8	Lions	Ed O'Neil	LB
1974	1	11	11	Rams	John Cappelletti	RB
1974	2	1	27	Bills	Doug Allen	LB
1974	2	15	41	Chiefs	Charlie Getty	OT
1974	2	17	43	Chargers	Mark Markovich	C
1974	5	2	106	Bills	Gary Hayman	WR
1974	6	6	136	Dolphins	Randy Crowder	DE
1974	9	9	217	Saints	Phil LaPorta	T
1974	10	22	256	Bengals	Chuck Herd	TE
1974	12	8	294	49ers	Tom Hull	LB
1975	2	5	31	Bears	Mike Hartenstine	DE
1975	4	3	81	Falcons	John Nessel	G
1975	4	24	102	Bills	Tom Donchez	RB
1975	6	12	142	Bengals	Tom Shuman	QB
1975	7	14	170	Bengals	Chris Devlin	LB
1975	8	16	198	Eagles	Jeff Bleamer	T
1975	9	15	223	49ers	Dan Natale	TE
1975	10	22	256	Dolphins	Joe Jackson	TE
1975	12	26	312	Steelers	Greg Murphy	DE
1975	17	5	421	Browns	Dave Graf	LB
1976	2	23	51	Bengals	Chris Bahr	K
1976	3	7	67	Jets	Greg Buttle	LB
1976	3	10	70	Steelers	Ron Coder	DT
1976	4	27	119	Cowboys	Tom Rafferty	G
1977	2	10	38	Oilers	George Reihner	G
1977	3	22	78	Cardinals	Kurt Allerman	LB
1977	5	2	114	Lions	Ron Crosby	LB
1977	8	24	219	Patriots	Brad Benson	G
1978	3	5	61	Jets	Mickey Shuler	TE
1978	3	25	81	Dolphins	Jimmy Cefalo	WR
1978	5	3	113	Jets	Randy Sidler	DT
1978	6	17	155	Bengals	Steve Geise	RB
1978	9	5	227	Jets	Neil Hutton	DB
1978	10	17	267	Bengals	Tom DePaso	LB
1978	11	25	303	Rams	Ron Hostetler	LB
1979	1	10	10	Lions	Keith Dorney	OT
1979	4	14	96	Jets	Eric Cunningham	G
1979	5	16	126	Eagles	Scott Fitzkee	WR
1979	6	8	145	Giants	Bob Torrey	RB
1979	6	28	165	Steelers	Matt Bahr	K
1979	7	17	182	Redskins	Rich Milot	LB
1979	8	4	196	Eagles	Chuck Correal	C
1979	10	17	265	Chargers	Tony Petruccio	DT
1980	1	4	4	Packers	Bruce Clark	DE
1980	2	15	43	Raiders	Matt Millen	LB
1980	2	18	46	Bears	Matt Suhey	FB
1980	2	22	50	Rams	Irv Pankey	OT
1980	3	13	69	Jets	Lance Mehl	LB
1980	6	16	154	Rams	Mike Guman	RB
1980	9	9	230	Chiefs	Tom Donovan	WR
1981	1	28	28	Bills	Booker Moore	RB
1981	3	2	58	Seahawks	Bill Dugan	G
1981	6	9	147	49ers	Pete Kugler	DT
1981	6	10	148	Redskins	Larry Kubin	LB
1981	7	20	186	Seahawks	Brad Scovill	TE
1981	8	21	214	Saints	Gene Gladys	LB
1981	11	13	289	Chiefs	Frank Case	DE
1982	1	8	8	Oilers	Mike Munchak	G
1982	1	17	17	Buccaneers	Sean Farrell	G
1982	2	1	28	Colts	Leo Wisniewski	DT
1982	2	10	37	Raiders	Jim Romano	C
1982	3	23	78	Eagles	Vyto Kab	TE
1982	3	25	80	Dolphins	Paul Lankford	CB
1982	5	15	126	Packers	Mike Meade	RB
1982	6	13	152	Packers	Chet Parlavecchio	LB
1982	9	11	234	Oilers	Matt Bradley	LB
1982	10	12	263	Raiders	Rich D'Amico	LB
1983	1	3	3	Seahawks	Curt Warner	RB
1983	1	7	7	Chiefs	Todd Blackledge	QB
1983	3	17	73	Vikings	Walker Lee Ashley	LB
1983	4	4	88	Oilers	Mike McCloskey	TE
1983	5	10	122	Browns	Bill Contz	OT
1983	5	28	140	Steelers	Gregg Garrity	WR
1983	10	10	261	Lions	Dave Laube	G
1983	10	12	263	Seahawks	Pete Speros	G
1983	10	17	268	Falcons	Ralph Giacomarro	P
1984	1	4	4	Jets	Kenny Jackson	WR
1984	2	6	34	Chiefs	Scott Radecic	LB
1984	3	14	70	Patriots	Jonathan Williams	RB
1984	4	6	90	Chiefs	Mark Robinson	S
1984	4	28	112	Buccaneers	Ron Heller	OT
1984	7	8	176	Jets	Harry Hamilton	S
1984	8	1	197	Oilers	Kevin Baugh	WR
1984	9	18	242	Rams	George Reynolds	P
1985	6	6	146	Lions	Stan Short	G
1985	7	24	192	Raiders	Nick Haden	C
1985	9	22	246	Raiders	Chris Sydnor	DB
1985	12	20	328	Patriots	Tony Mumford	RB
1986	4	23	105	Jets	Rogers Alexander	LB
1986	7	2	168	Bills	Bob Williams	TE
1986	9	14	235	Chargers	Mike Zordich	S
1987	1	8	8	Bills	Shane Conlan	LB
1987	1	14	14	Vikings	D. J. Dozier	RB
1987	3	24	80	Browns	Tim Manoa	FB
1987	3	25	81	Raiders	Steve Smith	FB
1987	4	1	85	Buccaneers	Don Graham	LB
1987	5	14	126	Cardinals	John Bruno	P
1987	5	20	132	Dolphins	Chris Conlin	OT
1987	6	1	141	Steelers	Tim Johnson	DT
1987	6	22	162	49ers	Bob White	LB
1987	8	27	222	Broncos	Dan Morgan	G
1987	9	24	247	Colts	Bob Ontko	LB
1987	10	17	268	Jets	Sid Lewis	DB
1987	11	7	286	Lions	Brian Siverling	TE
1988	3	3	58	Lions	Ray Roundtree	WR
1988	8	6	199	Raiders	Mike Alexander	WR
1988	10	1	250	Falcons	Stan Clayton	G
1988	11	12	289	Bills	Pete Curkendall	DT
1989	2	1	29	Cowboys	Steve Wisniewski	G
1989	4	16	100	Patriots	Michael Timpson	WR
1989	6	16	155	Colts	Quintus McDonald	LB
1989	9	21	244	Oilers	Bob Mrosko	TE
1989	11	3	282	Lions	Keith Karpinski	LB
1990	1	2	2	Jets	Blair Thomas	RB
1990	2	21	46	Redskins	Andre Collins	LB
1990	7	15	180	Chiefs	Dave Szott	G
1990	8	3	196	Jets	Roger Duffy	C
1991	3	19	74	Seahawks	David Daniels	WR
1991	6	19	158	Steelers	Leroy Thompson	RB
1991	8	19	214	Oilers	Gary Brown	RB
1991	10	13	263	Colts	Frank Giannetti	DE
1991	10	14	264	Cowboys	Sean Love	G
1991	12	13	319	Colts	Rob Luedeke	C
1992	2	6	34	Packers	Mark D'Onofrio	LB
1992	2	18	46	Cardinals	Tony Sacca	QB
1992	3	18	74	Redskins	Paul Siever	OT
1992	3	27	83	Bills	Keith Goganious	LB
1992	8	7	203	Steelers	Darren Perry	S
1992	8	9	205	Patriots	Sam Gash	FB
1992	8	13	209	Dolphins	Andre Powell	LB
1992	8	27	223	Bills	Leonard Humphries	CB
1992	11	28	308	Redskins	Terry Smith	WR
1993	1	25	25	Dolphins	O. J. McDuffie	WR
1993	2	10	39	Rams	Troy Drayton	TE
1993	2	22	51	Patriots	Todd Rucci	OT
1993	3	1	57	Vikings	John Gerak	G
1993	5	16	128	Redskins	Greg Huntington	C
1993	6	4	144	Jets	Richie Anderson	FB
1993	6	13	153	Browns	Rich McKenzie	LB
1993	8	17	213	Cowboys	Reggie Givens	CB
1994	3	29	94	Jets	Lou Benfatti	DT
1994	5	3	134	Vikings	Shelly Hammonds	DB
1994	6	19	180	Steelers	Eric Ravotti	LB
1994	7	23	217	Raiders	Rob Holmberg	LB
1995	1	1	1	Bengals	Ki-Jana Carter	RB
1995	1	5	5	Panthers	Kerry Collins	QB
1995	1	9	9	Jets	Kyle Brady	TE
1995	5	12	146	Broncos	Phil Yeboah-Kodie	LB
1995	6	16	187	Colts	Brian Gelheizer	LB
1996	1	23	23	Lions	Jeff Hartings	G
1996	1	30	30	Redskins	Andre Johnson	OT
1996	2	22	52	Bears	Bobby Engram	WR
1996	3	13	74	Oilers	Terry Killens	LB
1996	3	31	92	Steelers	Jon Witman	FB
1996	4	20	115	Colts	Brian Milne	FB
1996	6	24	191	Colts	Keith Conlin	OT
1996	6	31	198	49ers	Stephen Pitts	RB
1996	6	41	208	Packers	Marco Rivera	G
1996	7	9	218	Oilers	Mike Archie	RB
1997	2	28	58	Ravens	Kim Herring	S
1997	3	30	90	Packers	Brett Conway	K
1997	7	33	234	Ravens	Wally Richardson	QB
1998	1	5	5	Bears	Curtis Enis	RB
1998	2	25	55	Giants	Joe Jurevicius	WR
1998	5	28	151	49ers	Phil Ostrowski	G
1999	5	5	138	Colts	Brad Scioli	DE
1999	5	7	140	Seahawks	Floyd Wedderburn	G
2000	1	1	1	Browns	Courtney Brown	DE
2000	1	2	2	Redskins	LaVar Arrington	LB
2000	3	29	91	Colts	David Macklin	CB
2000	4	11	105	Giants	Brandon Short	LB
2001	3	9	71	Packers	Bhawoh Jue	S
2001	3	17	79	Jets	Kareem McKenzie	OT
2001	3	32	94	Jaguars	James Boyd	S
2001	5	16	147	Eagles	Tony Stewart	TE
2002	4	9	107	Chiefs	Omar Easy	FB
2002	6	24	196	Saints	John Gilmore	TE
2003	1	12	12	Rams	Jimmy Kennedy	DT
2003	1	14	14	Bears	Michael Haynes	DE
2003	1	17	17	Cardinals	Bryant Johnson	WR
2003	1	27	27	Chiefs	Larry Johnson	RB
2003	2	23	55	Falcons	Bryan Scott	S
2003	2	25	57	49ers	Anthony Adams	DT
2004	3	29	92	Titans	Rich Gardner	CB
2004	6	29	194	Steelers	Matt Kranchick	TE
2004	7	28	229	Colts	David Kimball	K
2004	7	40	241	Titans	Sean McHugh	TE
2006	1	20	20	Chiefs	Tamba Hali	LB
2006	4	3	100	49ers	Michael Robinson	FB
2006	4	5	102	Titans	Calvin Lowry	S
2006	4	25	122	Buccaneers	Alan Zemaitis	CB
2006	6	31	200	Bears	Tyler Reed	G
2006	7	1	209	Bengals	Ethan Kilmer	S
2007	1	5	5	Cardinals	Levi Brown	OT
2007	2	2	34	Bills	Paul Posluszny	LB
2007	3	18	81	Giants	Jay Alford	DT
2007	3	27	90	Eagles	Tony Hunt	RB
2007	5	27	164	Panthers	Tim Shaw	LB
2008	3	11	74	Panthers	Dan Connor	LB
2008	4	2	101	Rams	Justin King	CB
2009	1	11	11	Bills	Aaron Maybin	DE
2009	3	18	82	Lions	Derrick Williams	WR
2009	3	27	91	Seahawks	Deon Butler	WR
2009	4	23	123	Patriots	Rich Ohrnberger	G
2009	7	17	223	Steelers	A. Q. Shipley	C
2010	1	28	28	Dolphins	Jared Odrick	DE
2010	2	23	55	Cowboys	Sean Lee	LB
2010	3	27	91	49ers	NaVorro Bowman	LB
2010	5	23	154	Packers	Andrew Quarless	TE
2010	7	7	214	Vikings	Mickey Shuler Jr.	TE
2010	7	27	254	Rams	Josh Hull	LB
2011	2	16	48	Raiders	Stefen Wisniewski	C
2011	6	12	177	Redskins	Evan Royster	RB
2012	2	21	53	Bengals	Devon Still	DT
2012	5	14	149	Chargers	Johnnie Troutman	G
2012	5	23	158	Raiders	Jack Crawford	DT
2012	7	23	230	Raiders	Nate Stupar	LB
2013	3	25	87	Seahawks	Jordan Hill	DT
2013	4	23	120	Vikings	Gerald Hodges	LB
2013	7	7	213	Vikings	Michael Mauti	LB
2014	2	29	61	Jaguars	Allen Robinson	WR
2014	4	12	112	Titans	DaQuan Jones	DT
2014	5	35	175	Ravens	John Urschel	G
2015	2	2	34	Buccaneers	Donovan Smith	OT
2015	5	6	142	Bears	Adrian Amos	S
2015	5	24	160	Steelers	Jesse James	TE
2016	2	12	43	Titans	Austin Johnson	DT
2016	2	20	51	Jets	Christian Hackenberg	QB
2016	3	2	65	Browns	Carl Nassib	DE
2016	6	27	202	Lions	Anthony Zettel	DT
2016	6	29	204	Dolphins	Jordan Lucas	S
2017	3	20	84	Buccaneers	Chris Godwin	WR
2018	1	2	2	Giants	Saquon Barkley	RB
2018	2	10	42	Dolphins	Mike Gesicki	TE
2018	4	8	109	Redskins	Troy Apke	S
2018	4	12	113	Broncos	DaeSean Hamilton	WR
2018	5	11	148	Steelers	Marcus Allen	S
2018	6	8	182	Cardinals	Christian Campbell	CB
2019	2	21	53	Eagles	Miles Sanders	RB
2019	3	27	90	Cowboys	Connor McGovern	C
2019	4	36	138	Eagles	Shareef Miller	DE
2019	5	8	146	Lions	Amani Oruwariye	CB
2019	6	25	197	Ravens	Trace McSorley	QB
2019	7	29	243	Rams	Nick Scott	S
2020	2	6	38	Panthers	Yetur Gross-Matos	DE
2020	2	14	46	Broncos	K. J. Hamler	WR
2020	4	35	141	Texans	John Reid	CB
2020	6	4	183	Giants	Cam Brown	LB
2020	6	14	193	Colts	Robert Windsor	DT
2021	1	12	12	Cowboys	Micah Parsons	LB
2021	1	31	31	Ravens	Odafe Oweh	DE
2021	2	23	55	Steelers	Pat Freiermuth	TE
2021	7	18	246	Washington	Shaka Toney	DL
2021	7	19	247	Cardinals	Michal Menet	C
2021	7	20	248	Colts	Will Fries	G
2022	1	16	16	Commanders	Jahan Dotson	WR
2022	2	6	38	Falcons	Arnold Ebiketie	DE
2022	2	16	48	Bears	Jaquan Brisker	S
2022	4	15	120	Panthers	Brandon Smith	LB
2022	4	25	130	Ravens	Jordan Stout	K
2022	6	42	220	49ers	Tariq Castro-Fields	CB
2022	7	28	249	Packers	Rasheed Walker	OT
2022	7	35	256	Cardinals	Jesse Luketa	LB
2023	2	1	32	Steelers	Joey Porter Jr.	CB
2023	2	30	61	Jaguars	Brenton Strange	TE
2023	2	31	62	Texans	Juice Scruggs	C
2023	3	24	87	49ers	Ji'Ayir Brown	S
2023	5	14	149	Packers	Sean Clifford	QB
2023	6	8	185	Jaguars	Parker Washington	WR
2024	1	11	11	Jets	Olu Fashanu	OT
2024	1	21	21	Dolphins	Chop Robinson	DE
2024	3	5	69	Patriots	Caedan Wallace	T
2024	3	29	93	Ravens	Adisa Isaac	DE
2024	4	7	107	Giants	Theo Johnson	TE
2024	5	23	186	Chiefs	Hunter Nourzad	C
2024	6	43	219	Bills	Daequan Hardy	DB
2024	7	35	255	Packers	Kalen King	DB
2025	1	3	3	Giants	Abdul Carter	DE
2025	1	14	14	Colts	Tyler Warren	TE
2025	3	18	82	Titans	Kevin Winston Jr.	S
2025	6	11	187	Texans	Jaylen Reed	S
2025	6	25	201	Vikings	Kobe King	LB
2026	1	14	14	Ravens	Vega Ioane	G
2026	3	12	76	Steelers	Drew Allar	QB
2026	4	12	112	Cowboys	Drew Shelton	T
2026	4	20	120	Packers	Dani Dennis-Sutton	DE
2026	5	11	151	Panthers	Zakee Wheatley	S
2026	5	25	165	Titans	Nicholas Singleton	RB
2026	5	41	181	Bills	Zane Durant	DT
2026	6	6	187	Commanders	Kaytron Allen	RB

== Notable undrafted players ==
Debut Year	Player	Debut Team	Position	Notes
1937	Chuck Cherundolo	Cleveland Rams	C/LB	—
1942	Bob Wear	Philadelphia Eagles	C/LB	—
1945	Pepper Petrella	Philadelphia Eagles	HB	—
1945	Len Frketich	Pittsburgh Steelers	HB	—
1948	Steve Suhey	Pittsburgh Steelers	G	—
1960	Bob Scrabis	New York Titans	QB	—
1961	Lew Luce	Washington Redskins	RB	—
1962	Galen Hall	Washington Redskins	QB	—
1966	Joseph Bellas	Washington Redskins	T	—
1968	Roger Grimes	Dallas Cowboys	RB	—
1968	Tom Sherman	Boston Patriots	QB	—
1970	Bill Stansfield	San Diego Chargers	DT	—
1972	Chuck Crist	New York Giants	DB	—
1975	Brian Masella	Pittsburgh Steelers	K	—
1976	Jim Rosecrans	New York Jets	LB	—
1977	Rich Mauti	New Orleans Saints	WR	—
1978	Joe Volinsky	Seattle Seahawks	DE	—
1979	Willie Banks	Washington Redskins	LB	—
1980	Ron LaPointe	Baltimore Colts	TE	—
1981	Steve Griffiths	Seattle Seahawks	LB	—
1981	John Wojtowicz	New York Jets	G	—
1982	Brian Franco	Philadelphia Eagles	K	—
1983	Dave Opfar	Pittsburgh Steelers	DT	—
1985	John Walter	Kansas City Chiefs	TE	—
1986	Dean Dimido	Green Bay Packers	TE	—
1987	David Clark	Buffalo Bills	RB	—
1987	Duffy Cobbs	New England Patriots	DB	—
1987	Mitch Frerotte	Buffalo Bills	G	—
1987	Ray Isom	Tampa Bay Buccaneers	DB	—
1987	Massimo Manca	Cincinnati Bengals	K	—
1987	Keith Radecic	Washington Redskins	C	—
1987	John Shaffer	Dallas Cowboys	QB	—
1988	Pete Giftopoulos	Pittsburgh Steelers	LB	—
1988	Paul Pomfret	Green Bay Packers	TE	—
1991	Tom Bill	Buffalo Bills	QB	—
1991	Willie Thomas	Seattle Seahawks	CB	—
1992	Jim Deter	Chicago Bears	DT	—
1992	Mark Flythe	Denver Broncos	DE	—
1992	Doug Helkowski	Buffalo Bills	P	—
1993	Todd Burger	Chicago Bears	G	—
1994	Tyoka Jackson	Miami Dolphins	DT	—
1994	Brian O'Neal	Philadelphia Eagles	RB	—
1994	Greg Truitt	Cincinnati Bengals	LS	—
1995	Marlon Forbes	Chicago Bears	S	—
1995	Bucky Greeley	Chicago Bears	C	—
1995	Chris Mazyck	New York Giants	DT	—
1995	Wille Smith	Detroit Lions	LB	—
1996	Freddie Scott	Atlanta Falcons	WR	—
1997	Brandon Noble	San Francisco 49ers	DT	—
1998	Jim Nelson	San Francisco 49ers	LB	—
1999	Chris Eberly	Indianapolis Colts	RB	—
2000	Askari Adams	Buffalo Bills	DB	—
2000	Dave Fleischhauer	Cincinnati Bengals	DT	—
2000	Derek Fox	St. Louis Rams	S	—
2000	Corey Jones	Buffalo Bills	WR	—
2000	Kevin Thompson	Cleveland Browns	QB	—
2001	Justin Kurpeikis	Pittsburgh Steelers	LB	—
2001	Pat Pidgeon	Buffalo Bills	P	—
2001	Kenny Watson	Washington Redskins	RB	—
2002	Bruce Branch	Washington Redskins	DB	—
2002	Eddie Drummond^{*}	Detroit Lions	WR	Pro Bowl (2004)
2002	Bob Jones	New York Giants	DE	—
2002	Eric McCoo	Chicago Bears	RB	—
2003	Shawn Mayer	New England Patriots	DB	—
2005	John Bronson	Arizona Cardinals	TE	—
2005	Robbie Gould^{*}	Chicago Bears	K	Pro Bowl (2006)
2005	Andrew Guman	Detroit Lions	S	—
2005	Cameron Wake^{*}	New York Giants	DE	Pro Bowl (2012), (2013), (2014)
2006	Scott Paxson	Pittsburgh Steelers	DT	—
2006	Anwar Phillips	New Orleans Saints	DB	—
2006	Isaac Smolko	Pittsburgh Steelers	TE	—
2007	Edward Johnson	Indianapolis Colts	DT	—
2007	Jeremy Kapinos	New York Jets	P	—
2009	Mark Rubin	St. Louis Rams	WR	—
2009	Jordan Norwood^{†}	Philadelphia Eagles	WR	Super Bowl Champion (Super Bowl 50)
2010	Dennis Landolt	New York Giants	T	—
2011	Brett Brackett	Miami Dolphins	TE	—
2011	Ollie Ogbu	Indianapolis Colts	DT	—
2012	Stephfon Green	Detroit Lions	RB	—
2012	D'Anton Lynn	New York Jets	CB	—
2012	Derek Moye	Pittsburgh Steelers	WR	—
2012	Chaz Powell	Green Bay Packers	S	—
2012	Andrew Szczerba	Atlanta Falcons	TE	—
2013	Matt McGloin	Oakland Raiders	QB	—
2013	Matt Stankiewitch	New England Patriots	C	—
2014	Glenn Carson	Arizona Cardinals	LB	—
2014	Garry Gilliam	Seattle Seahawks	T	—
2015	Brad Bars	New York Giants	DE	—
2015	Mike Hull	Miami Dolphins	LB	—
2015	Ross Travis	Kansas City Chiefs	TE	—
2016	Kyle Carter	Minnesota Vikings	TE	—
2016	Trevor Williams	San Diego Chargers	CB	—
2017	Brandon Bell	Cincinnati Bengals	LB	—
2017	Malik Golden	San Francisco 49ers	S	—
2018	Curtis Cothran	Minnesota Vikings	DT	—
2018	Parker Cothran	Pittsburgh Steelers	DT	—
2018	Tyler Davis	Buffalo Bills	K	—
2018	Saeed Blacknall	Oakland Raiders	WR	—
2018	Jason Cabinda	Oakland Raiders	LB	—
2018	Grant Haley	New York Giants	CB	—
2018	Brendan Mahon	Carolina Panthers	G	—
2019	Curtis Akins	Cincinnati Bengals	LB	—
2019	Ryan Bates	Philadelphia Eagles	T	—
2020	Nick Bowers	Las Vegas Raiders	TE	—
2020	Dan Chisena	Minnesota Vikings	WR	—
2020	Blake Gillikin	New Orleans Saints	P	—
2020	Steven Gonzalez	Arizona Cardinals	OT	—
2022	Ellis Brooks	Green Bay Packers	LB	—
2022	Drew Hartlaub	Carolina Panthers	S	—
2022	John Lovett	Carolina Panthers	RB	—
2022	Derrick Tangelo	Atlanta Falcons	DT	—
2023	P. J. Mustipher	Denver Broncos	DT	—
2023	Chris Stoll	Seattle Seahawks	LS	—
2023	Jonathan Sutherland	Seattle Seahawks	S	—
2023	Mitchell Tinsley	Washington Commanders	WR	—
2024	Curtis Jacobs	Kansas City Chiefs	LB	—
2025	Coziah Izzard	Kansas City Chiefs	DT	—
2025	Jalen Kimber	Tennessee Titans	CB	—
2025	Sal Wormley	Jacksonville Jaguars	OL	—
2026	Nick Dawkins	Baltimore Ravens	C	—
2026	Dominic DeLuca	Baltimore Ravens	ILB	—
2026	Khalil Dinkins	San Francisco 49ers	TE	—
2026	Tyler Duzansky	Las Vegas Raiders	LS	—
2026	Trebor Peña	Jacksonville Jaguars	WR	—
2026	Devonte Ross	Los Angeles Chargers	WR	—
2026	Nolan Rucci	Indianapolis Colts	T	—
