= 1986 All-East football team =

American college football all-star team

The 1986 All-East football team consists of American football players chosen by the Associated Press as the best players at each position among the Eastern colleges and universities during the 1986 NCAA Division I-A football season.

== Offense ==
=== Quarterback ===
- John Shaffer, Penn State (AP-1)
- Lee Saltz, Temple (AP-2)

=== Running backs ===
- D. J. Dozier, Penn State (AP-1)
- Paul Palmer, Temple (AP-1)
- Craig Heyward, Pitt (AP-2)
- Troy Stradford, Boston College (AP-2)

=== Tight end ===
- Mike Hinnant, Temple (AP-1)
- Brian Siverling, Penn State (AP-2)

=== Wide receivers ===
- Kelvin Martin, Boston College (AP-1)
- Scott Schwedes, Syracuse (AP-1)
- Keith Gloster, Temple (AP-2)
- Eric Hamilton, Penn State (AP-2)

=== Tackles ===
- Chris Conlin, Penn State (AP-1)
- Randy Dixon, Pitt (AP-1)
- Rob Dickerson, Army (AP-2)
- Brian Smider, West Virginia (AP-2)

=== Guards ===
- Mark Stepnoski, Pitt (AP-1)
- Steve Trapilo, Boston College (AP-1)
- Dan Morgan, Penn State (AP-2)
- Joe Wolf, Boston College (AP-2)

=== Center ===
- Keith Radecic, Penn State (AP-1)
- Mike Dillon, Rutgers (AP-2)

=== Placekicker ===
- Massimo Manca, Penn State (AP-1)
- Bill Wright, Temple (AP-2)

== Defense ==
=== Ends ===
- Shane Conlan, Penn State (AP-1)
- Tony Woods, Pitt (AP-1)
- Don Graham, Penn State (AP-2)
- Jeff Ward, Temple (AP-2)

=== Tackles ===
- John Bosa, Boston College (AP-1)
- Tim Johnson, Penn State (AP-1)
- Harry Swayne, Rutgers (AP-2)
- Bob White, Penn State (AP-2)

=== Nose guard ===
- Mike Russo, Penn State (AP-1)
- Jim Brock, Army (AP-2)

=== Linebackers ===
- Bill Romanowski, Boston College (AP-1)
- Tyronne Stowe, Rutgers (AP-1)
- Tim Pidgeon, Syracuse (AP-2)
- Matt Smith, West Virginia (AP-2)

=== Defensive backs ===
- Duffy Cobbs, Penn State (AP-1)
- Marc Firlie, Navy (AP-1)
- Ray Isom, Penn State (AP-1)
- Billy Owens, Pitt (AP-1)
- Larry Brewton, Temple (AP-2)
- Travis Curtis, West Virginia (AP-2)
- Karl Kreshpane, Boston College (AP-2)
- Gary Richard, Pitt (AP-2)

=== Punter ===
- John Bruno, Penn State (AP-1)
- Jim Fox, Syracuse (AP-2)

== Key ==
- AP = Associated Press

== See also ==
- 1986 College Football All-America Team
