= John Bruno =

John Bruno may refer to:

- John Bruno (special effects), American visual effects artist and filmmaker
- John Bruno (American football) (1964–1992), American football punter

== See also ==
- J. Jon Bruno (1946–2021), American bishop
