= 1983 All-East football team =

American college football all-star team

The 1983 All-East football team consists of American football players chosen by the Associated Press as the best players at each position among the Eastern colleges and universities during the 1983 NCAA Division I-A football season.

== Offense ==
=== Quarterback ===
- Doug Flutie, Boston College (AP-1)
- Jeff Hostetler, West Virginia (AP-2)

=== Running backs ===
- Napoleon McCallum, Navy (AP-1)
- Paul Palmer, Temple (AP-1)
- D. J. Dozier, Penn State (AP-2)
- Joe McCall, Pitt (AP-2)

=== Tight end ===
- Scott Gieselman, Boston College (AP-1)
- Alan Andrews, Rutgers (AP-2)

=== Wide receivers ===
- Brian Brennan, Boston College (AP-1)
- Kenny Jackson, Penn State (AP-1)
- Rich Hollins, West Virginia (AP-2)
- Bill Wallace, Pitt (AP-2)

=== Tackles ===
- Bill Fralic, Pitt (AP-1)
- Mark MacDonald, Boston College (AP-1)
- Doug Marrone, Syracuse (AP-2)
- Stan Short, Penn State (AP-2)

=== Guards ===
- Jeff Johnson, Navy (AP-1)
- John Owens, Rutgers (AP-1)
- Scott Barrows, West Virginia (AP-2)

=== Center ===
- Jim Sweeney, Pitt (AP-1)
- Joe DiGilio, Rutgers (AP-2)

=== Placekicker ===
- Paul Woodside, West Virginia (AP-1)
- Don McAulay, Syracuse (AP-2)

== Defense ==
=== Ends ===
- Steve Hathaway, West Virginia (AP-1)
- Al Wenglikowski, Pitt (AP-1)
- Larry Carroll, Army (AP-2)
- Chris Doleman, Pitt (AP-2)

=== Tackles ===
- Tim Green, Syracuse (AP-1)
- Bill Maas, Pitt (AP-1)
- Greg Gattuso, Penn State (AP-2)
- Jeff Kurdyla, Rutgers (AP-2)

=== Middle guard ===
- Mike Ruth, Boston College (AP-1)
- Dave Oblak, West Virginia (AP-2)

=== Linebackers ===
- Steve DeOssie, Boston College (AP-1)
- Jim Dumont, Rutgers (AP-1)
- Andy Ponseigo, Navy (AP-1)
- Scott Radecic, Penn State (AP-2)
- Tony Romano, Syracuse (AP-2)

=== Defensive backs ===
- Tim Agee, West Virginia (AP-1)
- Harry Hamilton, Penn State (AP-1)
- Steve Newberry, West Virginia (AP-1)
- Troy Hill, Pitt (AP-2)
- George Radachowsky, Boston College (AP-2)
- Kevin Ross, Temple (AP-2)
- Anthony Young, Temple (AP-2)

=== Punter ===
- Kip Shenefelt, Temple (AP-1)
- Joe Sartiano, Army (AP-2)

== Key ==
- AP = Associated Press

== See also ==
- 1983 College Football All-America Team
