= 1985 All-East football team =

American college football all-star team

The 1985 All-East football team consists of American football players selected by the Associated Press (AP) as the best players at their respective positions among Eastern colleges and universities during the 1985 NCAA Division I-A football season. The team included players from programs such as Penn State, Syracuse, Boston College, West Virginia, Temple, and Army.

Penn State led all schools with eight first-team selections, while Syracuse and Boston College were also heavily represented on the squad.

== Offense ==
=== Quarterbacks ===
- John Shaffer, Penn State (AP-1)
- Don McPherson, Syracuse (AP-2)

=== Running backs ===
- Napoleon McCallum, Navy (AP-1)
- Paul Palmer, Temple (AP-1)
- Doug Black, Army (AP-2)
- Charles Gladman, Pitt (AP-2)

=== Tight ends ===
- Scott Gieselman, Boston College (AP-1)
- Dean DiMidio, Penn State (AP-2)

=== Wide receivers ===
- Kelvin Martin, Boston College (AP-1)
- Scott Schwedes, Syracuse (AP-1)
- Willie Marshall, Temple (AP-2)
- Mike Siano, Syracuse (AP-2)

=== Tackles ===
- Randy Dixon, Pitt (AP-1)
- Brian Jozwiak, West Virginia (AP-1)
- Bob Brotzki, Syracuse (AP-2)
- Steve Trapilo, Boston College (AP-2)

=== Guards ===
- John Rienstra, Temple (AP-1)
- Don Smith, Army (AP-1)
- Lee Getz, Rutgers (AP-2)
- Todd Moules, Penn State (AP-2)

=== Centers ===
- Ron Rice, Army (AP-1)

=== Placekickers ===
- Massimo Manca, Penn State (AP-1)
- Don McAulay, Syracuse (AP-2)

== Defense ==
=== Defensive ends ===
- Shane Conlan, Penn State (AP-1)
- Fred Smalls, West Virginia (AP-1)
- Don Graham, Penn State (AP-2)
- Tony Woods, Pitt (AP-2)

=== Defensive tackles ===
- Tim Green, Syracuse (AP-1)
- Tim Johnson, Penn State (AP-1)
- John Bosa, Boston College (AP-2)
- Mike Russo, Penn State (AP-2)

=== Middle guards ===
- Mike Ruth, Boston College (AP-1)
- Ted Gregory, Syracuse (AP-2)

=== Linebackers ===
- Rogers Alexander, Penn State (AP-1)
- Bill Romanowski, Boston College (AP-1)
- Tyronne Stowe, Rutgers (AP-1)
- Derek Christian, West Virginia (AP-2)
- Tim Pidgeon, Syracuse (AP-2)
- Matt Smith, West Virginia (AP-2)

=== Defensive backs ===
- Lance Hamilton, Penn State (AP-1)
- Doug Pavek, Army (AP-1)
- Mike Zordich, Penn State (AP-1)
- Travis Curtis, West Virginia (AP-2)
- Marc Firlie, Navy (AP-2)
- Markus Paul, Syracuse (AP-2)

=== Punters ===
- John Bruno, Penn State (AP-1)
- Kip Shenefelt, Temple (AP-2)

== Selections by school ==
=== First-team selections ===
- Penn State – 8
- Boston College – 4
- Syracuse – 3
- Army – 3
- Temple – 3
- West Virginia – 3
- Navy – 1
- Pitt – 1
- Rutgers – 1

== Key ==
- AP = Associated Press
- AP-1 = First-team Associated Press selection
- AP-2 = Second-team Associated Press selection

== See also ==
- 1985 College Football All-America Team
