= Tyronne Stowe =

American football player (born 1965)

No. 56, 90, 59
- Position: Linebacker

Personal information
- Born: May 30, 1965 (age 61); Passaic, New Jersey, U.S.
- Listed height: 6 ft 2 in (1.88 m)
- Listed weight: 250 lb (113 kg)

Career information
- High school: Passaic
- College: Rutgers
- NFL draft: 1987: undrafted

Career history
- San Diego Chargers (1987)*; Pittsburgh Steelers (1987–1990); Phoenix Cardinals (1991–1993); Washington Redskins (1994); Seattle Seahawks (1995–1996)
- * Offseason or practice squad member only

Awards and highlights
- Third-team All-American (1986); 2× First-team All-East (1985, 1986); Second-team All-East (1984)

Career NFL statistics
- Tackles: 275
- Fumble recoveries: 4
- Sacks: 1.5
- Stats at Pro Football Reference

Tyronne Kevin Stowe (born May 30, 1965) is an American former professional football player who was a linebacker for nine seasons in the National Football League (NFL).

Stowe was born and raised in Passaic, New Jersey and played scholastically at Passaic High School. He played college football at Rutgers University, where he was honored by Football News as a third-team All-American as a senior.

Stowe signed with the San Diego Chargers as an undrafted free agent, but was cut at the end of the preseason. He then joined the Pittsburgh Steelers as a replacement player during the 1987 NFLPA strike.

After the strike, the Steelers added him to their regular-season roster, and he remained with them for four years (1987-1990). He followed that with three seasons for the Phoenix Cardinals (1991-1993), and finished his career with stints in Washington (1994) and Seattle (1995-1996). He spent the 1996 season on the injured reserve list.

As of 2007, Stowe was working as a pastor in Chandler, Arizona.

== See also ==
- List of Rutgers University people
