= Catonsville High School =

Coordinates: 39°15′34″N 76°43′52″W

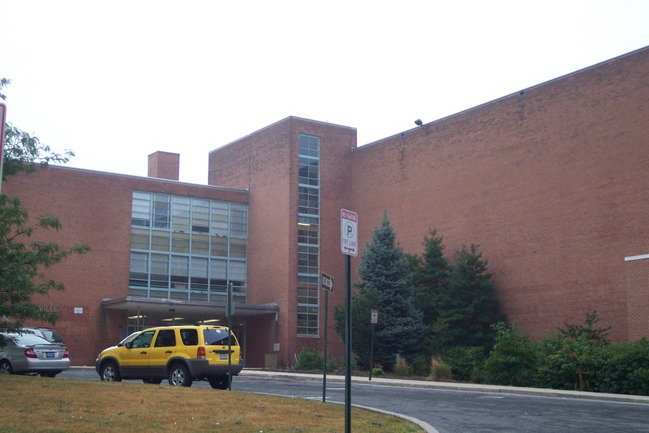
- Catonsville High School

Location
- 421 Bloomsbury Avenue; Catonsville, Maryland 21228; United States

Information
- Type: Public High School
- Established: 1903
- Status: Open
- School district: Baltimore Public Schools
- Superintendent: Darryl Williams
- CEEB code: 2120070
- NCES School ID: 240012000355
- Principal: Matthew Ames
- Teaching staff: 110.68 (on an FTE basis)
- Grades: 9–12
- Gender: Boys and Girls (Co-ed)
- Age: 14 years old to 21 years old
- Enrollment: 1,813 (2021–2022)
- Student to teacher ratio: 16.38
- Hours in school day: 6.5
- Campus: Suburban
- Campus size: 64 acres (260,000 m^{2})
- Colors: Dark Blue and Gold
- Slogan: Be. Do. Create. Your Best.
- Sports: Allied Bocce; Allied Soccer; Allied Softball; Badminton (Boys & Girls); Baseball (Boys); Basketball (Boys & Girls); Cheerleading (Girls); Cross Country (Boys & Girls); Field Hockey (Girls); Football (Boys); Lacrosse (Boys & Girls); Soccer (Boys & Girls); Softball (Girls); Tennis (Boys & Girls); Indoor/Outdoor Track & Feild (Boys & Girls); Volleyball (Girls); Wrestling (Boys)
- Mascot: Comet
- Nickname: The Comets
- Team name: Comets
- Newspaper: The Comet
- Yearbook: Catonian
- Feeder schools: Westchester Elementary School; Hillcrest Elementary School; Woodbridge Elementary School; Westowne Elementary School; Catonsville Elementary School; Arbutus Elementary School; Relay Elementary School; Halethorpe Elementary School; Catonsville Middle School; Arbutus Middle School
- Website: catonsvillehs.bcps.org

Catonsville High School (CHS) is a four-year public high school in Catonsville, Maryland. It is located on the southwest side of Baltimore County, Maryland, close to the Baltimore border near Anne Arundel and Howard County, just outside the Baltimore Beltway.

== History ==
The original school traces its roots to Catonsville School, formed in 1903. Students were taught at the original brick building until 1910, when a large new school was dedicated to relieve overcrowding. In 1925, Baltimore County purchased land and buildings from the Catonsville Country Club with the intention of making it the new high school.

In 1954, a new building was dedicated at the school's current location. The campus was originally the "Farmlands" estate, owned in the 19th century by Theodore Lurman. The Lurman Woodland Theater on the school's grounds is named in his memory.

The school benefited from a 77,000-square-foot (7,200 m^{2}) expansion in 1999. There have been other upgrades and renovations to many of the structures.

== Academics ==
Catonsville High School received a 64.5 out of a possible 100 points (64%) on the 2018–2019 Maryland State Department of Education Report Card and received a 4 out of 5 star rating, ranking in the 61st percentile among all Maryland schools.

== Students ==
The 2019–2020 enrollment at Catonsville High School was 1826. The graduation rate at Catonsville High School ranged from 94% in 1998 to a low of 83% in 2001.

== Athletics ==
=== State championships ===
Girls Cross Country:

- 2A 1993

Boys Cross Country:

- Class A 1946, 1959
- Class AA 1960, 1964

Boys Soccer:

- Pre-MPSSAA Combined Class 1918, 1919, 1921, 1928

Volleyball:

- Class A 1979, 1980, 1981,1982, 1983, 1986
- Class B 1987

Girls Softball:

- 4A 2021

Girls Basketball:

- 4A 2017

Boys Basketball:

- Pre-MPSSAA 1928
- Class A 1992

Girls Indoor Track:

- 3A TIE 1992

== Notable alumni ==
- Jeff Altenburg - professional race car driver.
- John Christ - professional musician and original guitarist for the metal band Danzig.
- John Cluster - Delegate, State of Maryland Representing the 8th District
- Jasmine Dickey - professional basketball player for the Dallas Wings in the Women's National Basketball Association (WNBA).
- Roy Heiser - former professional baseball player.
- Brian Jozwiak - Offensive lineman for the West Virginia University and the Kansas City Chiefs
- Dan Keech - Height Keech, Rapper.
- Adam Kolarek - Major League Baseball pitcher in the Los Angeles Angels organization.
- Deray McKesson - Activist and Candidate for Baltimore City Mayor.
- Jeff Nelson - former Major League Baseball pitcher with the New York Yankees and Seattle Mariners
- Andy Stack - professional musician and drummer/keyboardist for Wye Oak
- Tim Suhrstedt - cinematographer, Teen Wolf, Office Space

== See also ==
- List of Schools in Baltimore County, Maryland
