= 1984 All-East football team =

American college football all-star team

The 1984 All-East football team consists of American football players chosen by the Associated Press as the best players at each position among the Eastern colleges and universities during the 1984 NCAA Division I-A football season.

== Offense ==
=== Quarterback ===
- Doug Flutie, Boston College (AP-1)
- Nathan Sassaman, Army (AP-2)

=== Running backs ===
- Doug Black, Army (AP-1)
- Paul Palmer, Temple (AP-1)
- D. J. Dozier, Penn State (AP-2)
- Albert Smith, Rutgers (AP-2)

=== Tight end ===
- Alan Andrews, Rutgers (AP-1)
- Scott Gieselman, Boston College (AP-2)

=== Wide receivers ===
- Andrew Baker, Rutgers (AP-1)
- Gerard Phelan, Boston College (AP-1)
- Willie Drewrey, West Virginia (AP-2)
- Bill Wallace, Pitt (AP-2)

=== Tackles ===
- Bill Fralic, Pitt (AP-1)
- Brian Jozwiak, West Virginia (AP-1)
- Randy Dixon, Pitt (AP-2)
- Mark MacDonald, Boston College (AP-2)

=== Guards ===
- John Rienstra, Temple (AP-1)
- Don Smith, Army (AP-1)
- Scott Barrows, West Virginia (AP-2)
- Steve Trapilo, Boston College (AP-2)

=== Center ===
- Gregg Sears, Navy (AP-1)
- Joe DiGilio, Rutgers (AP-2)

=== Placekicker ===
- Paul Woodside, West Virginia (AP-1)
- Don McAulay, Syracuse (AP-2)

== Defense ==
=== Ends ===
- Tim Hanley, Temple (AP-1)
- Chris Doleman, Pitt (AP-1)
- Jamie Kimmel, Syracuse (AP-2)
- Gerry Allen, Syracuse (AP-2)

=== Tackles ===
- Tim Green, Syracuse (AP-1)
- Eric Rutherford, Navy (AP-1)
- Jim Jennings, Army (AP-2)
- Todd Moules, Penn State (AP-2)

=== Middle guard ===
- Mike Ruth, Boston College (AP-1)
- George Pickel, Rutgers (AP-2)

=== Linebackers ===
- Troy Benson, Pitt (AP-1)
- Bernard King, Syracuse (AP-1)
- Mike Zordich, Penn State (AP-1)
- Caesar Aldisert, Pitt (AP-2)
- Jim Gentile, Army (AP-2)
- Tyronne Stowe, Rutgers (AP-2)

=== Defensive backs ===
- Todd Bowles, Temple (AP-1)
- Ron Hobby, Syracuse (AP-1)
- Tony Thurman, Boston College (AP-1)
- Anthony Young, Temple (AP-1)
- Travis Curtis, West Virginia (AP-2)
- Anthony Daniels, West Virginia (AP-2)
- Harold Young, Rutgers (AP-2)

=== Punter ===
- Steve Superick, West Virginia (AP-1)
- Jim Fox, Syracuse (AP-2)

== Key ==
- AP = Associated Press

== See also ==
- 1984 College Football All-America Team
