= 1987 Fiesta Bowl =

1987 Sunkist Fiesta Bowl
- 16th Fiesta Bowl "The National Championship"
Miami Hurricanes	Penn State Nittany Lions
(11–0)	(11–0)
Independent	Independent
10	14
Head coach: Jimmy Johnson	Head coach: Joe Paterno
AP / Coaches; 1 / 1	AP / Coaches; 2 / 2
	1	2	3	4	Total
Miami	0	7	0	3	10
Penn State	0	7	0	7	14
- Date: January 2, 1987
- Season: 1986
- Stadium: Sun Devil Stadium
- Location: Tempe, Arizona
- MVP: D. J. Dozier (PSU RB); Shane Conlan (PSU LB)
- Favorite: Miami by 6½ points
- National anthem: Penn State Blue Band
- Referee: Jimmy Harper (SEC)
- Halftime show: Band of the Hour, Penn State Blue Band
- Attendance: 73,098

United States TV coverage
- Network: NBC
- Announcers: Charlie Jones, Bob Griese, and Jimmy Cefalo
- Nielsen ratings: 24.9

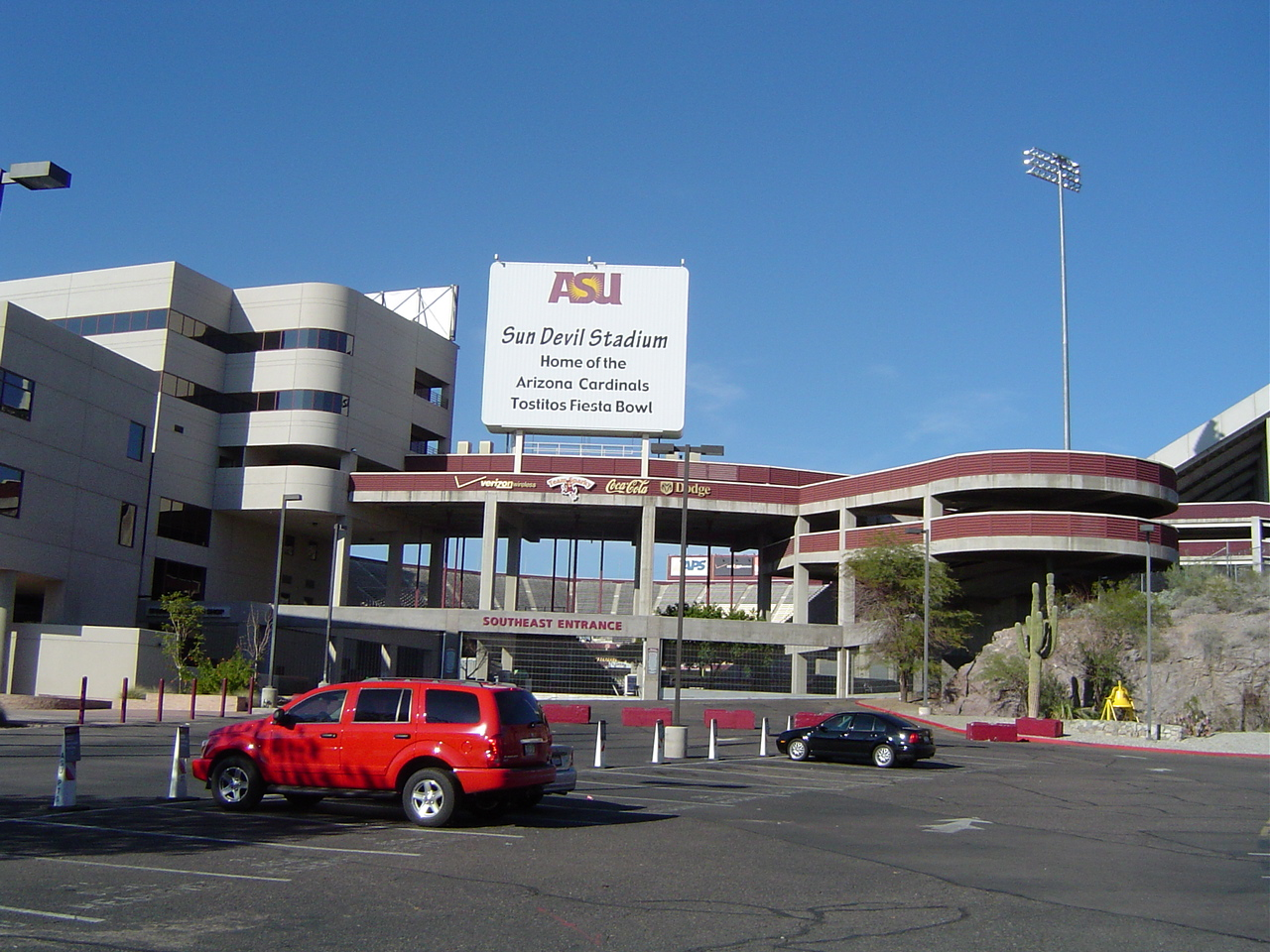
Sun Devil Stadium in Tempe, Arizona, hosted the Fiesta Bowl.

The 1987 Sunkist Fiesta Bowl was the 16th edition of the Fiesta Bowl, sponsored by Sunkist Growers through its Sunkist soft drink brand. The bowl game served as the final game of the 1986 NCAA Division I-A football season. Part of the NCAA football bowl 1986–87 game season, the 1987 Fiesta Bowl also served as the NCAA National Championship Game. It pitted the No. 1 ranked Miami Hurricanes against the No. 2 Penn State Nittany Lions. It was the bowl's 16th edition, played annually since 1971 at Sun Devil Stadium in Tempe, Arizona. The Nittany Lions narrowly upset the heavily favored Hurricanes to win their second national championship in school history. As of 2026, this is Penn State's most recent national championship victory and appearance.

Played at night on Friday, January 2, it matched the top-ranked Miami Hurricanes and #2 Penn State Nittany Lions. As the first part of NBC's tripleheader of bowl games on New Year's Day in the previous five years, the Fiesta Bowl had kicked off at 11:30 a.m. MST and led into the Rose Bowl. Since this year's game would determine the national championship, organizers decided to play it a day later on January 2; the kickoff was just after 6 p.m. MST, prime time in the Eastern and Central time zones.

It drew a 25.1 rating for NBC, which the bowl organizers claimed was a record for any college football game; the 1980 Rose Bowl, which NBC also aired, drew a 28.6 rating but was seen in fewer homes than the Fiesta Bowl, which was viewed in 21.9 million versus the 21.8 million the Rose Bowl had been viewed in.

== Bowl selection ==
The Fiesta Bowl had been played on New Year's Day since the 1982 game. This was because, despite its relatively new status, it frequently featured matchups between highly-ranked conference runners-up or major independents.

Despite its growing prestige, the Fiesta was not considered by many to be a major bowl game. Instead, that distinction was given to four other New Year's bowls— the Cotton, Rose, Sugar, and Orange were all considered major bowls. Each of these bowls was required to take at least one conference's champion as per their charters regardless of the team's rank; the Southwest Conference champion hosted the Cotton, the Big Ten Conference and Pac-10 Conference matched up in the Rose, the Big 8 Conference champion hosted the Orange, and the Southeastern Conference champion hosted the Sugar Bowl. The Fiesta Bowl had a tie in with the Western Athletic Conference for its first seven years, but the agreement ended after Arizona State and Arizona left the WAC to join the Pac-10. Since its debut in December 1971, one team from the West was often invited, but the Fiesta Bowl was not bound by geography.

The climate of college football was different in 1986, as there were twenty-four independents, as opposed to two in 2026. Some high-profile programs were among those twenty-four teams, with Penn State and Miami being two of them. Since these teams had no ties to any conference, bowl committees were free to invite them as they saw fit. For instance, Penn State was invited to the previous year's Orange Bowl, while Miami received an invitation to the Sugar Bowl.

If an independent was either first or second in the rankings, their bowl matchup would be determined by what bowl game the other team in the top two was tied to and that bowl would serve as the national championship game. In fact, both Penn State and Miami's previous national championships were won this way. The 1982 Penn State squad, ranked second, defeated #1 Georgia in the Sugar Bowl. The next season, Miami had a chance to win the national title in their home stadium against #1 Nebraska in the Orange Bowl and did.

In 1985, both Penn State and Miami finished the regular season ranked first and second. However, by the time the final polls were released both schools had already made arrangements. As noted above, Penn State went to the Orange Bowl and faced #3 Oklahoma while Miami took on #9 Tennessee in the Sugar Bowl. While the possibility existed for a split national championship, neither team won their bowl game.

In 1986, the situation once again arose where both schools finished the regular season atop the polls. This time, there would be a matchup between Miami and Penn State, requiring a different plan as to how to resolve where the game would be taking place. All of the bowl games had been set except for the one that Miami and Penn State would be playing in for the national championship. The Fiesta Bowl selection committee's only opposition came from the organizers of the Citrus Bowl in Orlando, which like the Fiesta Bowl was not locked in to taking anyone from a conference. The bidding process resulted in the game being awarded to the Fiesta Bowl. As a result, the Fiesta Bowl's growing national prestige increased even further, ultimately propelling it to major-bowl status (and depending on the source, even replacing the Cotton Bowl as the fourth major bowl). The Fiesta Bowl became part of the Bowl Alliance and Bowl Championship Series years later, and is today part of the New Year's Six.

As noted above, the Fiesta Bowl had previously kicked off in the late morning (MST), early afternoon in the East. At the time, the structure of the New Year's Day games saw the Fiesta and Cotton Bowls played first, with the Rose Bowl starting around 4:45 pm EST and the Orange and Sugar Bowls played at night at the same time. (The Orange moved to night in 1965, the Sugar in 1982). NBC at the time was the television home for three of the aforementioned bowls, and if the national title was to be decided in one of them, airing the Fiesta Bowl early in the day would have been of little benefit. This brought about the shift in dates to January 2, which ensured the game would not face any competition from any other bowl game that might have been played at the time and helped it gain the record-setting audience it pulled in. In November, the potential changing of the date (and time) was not initially welcomed by the NCAA.

== Teams ==
Oklahoma and Michigan began the season ranked at #1 and #2 respectively, but the Wolverines slipped to #3 behind Miami following the Hurricanes 23–15 defeat of #13 Florida on September 6. A 28–16 defeat of Oklahoma by #2 Miami on September 27 pushed Miami into the #1 ranking, with Alabama moving into the #2 spot. However, Alabama lost to Penn State 23–3 on October 25, a result that jumped the Nittany Lions to the #2 spot behind Miami. Michigan regained the #2 spot after their 31–7 victory over Purdue, coupled with Penn State's close 17–15 victory over unranked Maryland that same day. But, the following week, Penn State once again found itself ranked #2 following Minnesota's 20–17 upset victory at Michigan. Penn State then finished out the regular season on November 22 with a 34–14 victory over in-state rival Pitt, while Miami finished their season the following Thursday with a 36–10 victory over East Carolina to set up the #1 vs. #2 showdown.

=== Miami Hurricanes ===
Miami entered the game with a seemingly unstoppable team. The Hurricanes had outscored their opponents during the season 420–136 en route to a perfect regular season. They had held the #1 ranking since handing the reigning champion (and eventual #3) Oklahoma Sooners their only loss in late September. The 1986 Heisman Trophy winner, Vinny Testaverde starred at quarterback. The team also featured All-Americans Jerome Brown, Dan Sileo, and Bennie Blades on defense, future NFL Hall-of-Famer Michael Irvin at wide receiver, and fullback Alonzo Highsmith, the third overall pick in the 1987 NFL draft.

=== Penn State Nittany Lions ===
Penn State came into the game with a different pedigree. Also 11–0 and undefeated, the Nittany Lions had nonetheless looked rather beatable, with close wins against Cincinnati, Maryland, and Notre Dame, all teams with .500 records or worse. However, the Lions relished their underdog status and their ability to shut teams down with a stifling, highly rated defense. They had All-Americans at linebacker (Shane Conlan), defensive tackle (Tim Johnson), running back (D.J. Dozier), and offensive tackle (Chris Conlin). "We were a team that couldn't be intimidated, and that's what Miami liked to do to other players," linebacker Pete Giftopoulos later observed. "How are you going to intimidate a bunch of steel-town kids from Pittsburgh, Ohio, Pennsylvania? You just can't do that."

== Bowl arrangements ==
An Arizona State win over Cal, combined with a UCLA loss to Stanford, enabled the Sun Devils to clinch the Pac-10's Rose Bowl berth on November 8. This early clinching began a scramble for all the bowl games to confirm teams before the bids were to be officially extended on November 22. Michigan's upset loss at home to Minnesota on November 15 set Miami and Penn State at #1 and #2. The Cotton Bowl offered to take the loser of the Michigan–Ohio State game, as the winner went to the Rose Bowl. With Penn State and Miami already written off to the bidding winner between the Fiesta and Citrus bowls, the other bowls made similar arrangements to take second-place teams.

With Miami and Penn State the top two teams in the nation, and both independents unaffiliated with any conferences or bowl tie-ins, there was an opportunity to create a #1–2 matchup in what were widely seen as a second-tier bowls By November 17, the Citrus Bowl, which had planned to pay $875,000 per team, was offering about $2.6 million apiece to Miami and Penn State to land the game; the Fiesta, which normally pays $1.1 million per, was offering around $2.4 million and was poised to go higher. The Sugar Bowl, Cotton Bowl, and Orange Bowl all had payouts in the neighborhood of $2 million. The Rose Bowl paid $6 million per team.

This was only the 21st time since 1936 that #1 faced #2, and only the seventh time in a bowl game. It was only the fifth time in college football history that there had been two #1 vs #2 games in the same season.

== Pre-game buildup ==
The game was described by many commentators as a battle between "Good versus Evil." With Penn State considered the "good" and Miami considered the "evil."

On the flight to the game the entire Miami Hurricane team changed into military-style fatigues to play into the "warfare" element of the contest. The game had been referred to as the "Duel in the Desert."

Reggie Taylor of the Cincinnati Bearcats, who had played both teams said, "It's harder to run against Penn State. They're so disciplined you can't exploit their weaknesses as much." Defensive tackle Bob Leshnak said, "Miami's center [Gregg Rakoczy] is the best I've faced. Our line moves a lot, and it gave Penn State problems." Cincinnati coach Dave Currey said, "The only place Miami has a big edge is quarterback. If Penn State can control the ball, it has less chance of beating itself. In a game like this, you've first got to not beat yourself."

== Telecast ==
Instead of reassigning its primary football broadcast team of Dick Enberg and Merlin Olsen from its Rose Bowl telecast, NBC allowed Charlie Jones to be the play-by-play voice for his eighth consecutive Fiesta Bowl even after the contest became the national championship game. The color commentators with Jones were Bob Griese and Jimmy Cefalo, the latter completing his first full year as a game analyst with the network. NBC also added a 15-minute pregame show co-hosted by Bob Costas and Ahmad Rashad. A live interview with President Ronald Reagan aired at halftime.

NBC was generally lauded for stressing the magnitude of the event while keeping the broadcast simple. Jim Sarni of the South Florida SunSentinel wrote that Jones "kept the telecast flowing with his controlled style" and "did not get carried away by the delirious finish," Griese "supplied the key insight" and "was able to express himself again" after working an entire football season alongside a loquacious Marv Albert and Cefalo "got better as the telecast went on" despite being "overexcited."

== Game summary ==
Penn State wore their blue home jerseys with white pants, while Miami wore their white road jerseys with orange pants.

Miami outgained Penn State on the field, 445 yards to 162, with 22 first downs compared to the Nittany Lions' eight. However, the Hurricanes were hampered by seven turnovers, including five interceptions of the Heisman-winning Testaverde.

The majority of the game was a seesaw battle. Miami's only touchdown was the result of a John Shaffer fumble that the Hurricanes recovered at the Penn State 23. Miami then took four plays to score the go-ahead touchdown.

The Nittany Lions responded with their only sustained drive of the night, going 74 yards in 13 plays, culminating in Shaffer's four-yard scamper into the end zone. The halftime score was a 7–7 tie.

After Miami scored a field goal, by Mark Seelig, to retake the lead, Shane Conlan grabbed his second interception of the night, returning it 39 yards to the Miami five. The first Penn State snap was fumbled, but the Nittany Lions recovered. D. J. Dozier then followed with a six-yard run for the Lions' first lead.

Miami still had over eight minutes on the clock, but fumbled on their next possession. With Penn State unable to move the ball, Miami began their last drive on their own 23 with 3:07 left in the game. A fourth down completion to Brian Blades went for 31 yards and moved Miami into Penn State territory. With a minute left, Testaverde hit Michael Irvin at the Penn State 10. The connection put the Hurricanes inside the five with 45 seconds left. Even with a national championship at stake, though, Penn State linebacker Pete Giftopoulos said the Penn State defense stayed calm. "We had some great leaders – (seniors) Shane Conlan, Timmy Johnson, Bob White," he said. "They were key character people. To not see any fear in their eyes helped me as a junior and helped the other players to play the game. ... Nobody was losing it in the huddle, nobody was screaming. Everyone was like, 'Here's the play; let's do it.'"

On second-and-goal, Testaverde dropped back, but Tim Johnson broke free and sacked him. On third down, Testaverde threw incomplete into the flat. On fourth-and-goal, with 18 seconds left, Testaverde threw to the end zone, but was intercepted by Giftopoulos. The interception, Giftopoulos' second of the game (and Testaverde's fifth), ensured Penn State's second national title in five years.

== Scoring summary ==
Scoring summary

Quarter	Time	Drive			Team	Scoring information	Score	
Quarter	Time	Plays	Yards	TOP	Team	Scoring information	MIA	PSU
2	6:38				MIA	Melvin Bratton 1-yard touchdown run, Greg Cox kick good	7	0
2	1:14				PSU	John Shaffer 4-yard touchdown run, Massimo Manca kick good	7	7
4	11:49				MIA	38-yard field goal by Mark Seelig	10	7
4	8:13				PSU	D.J. Dozier 6-yard touchdown run, Massimo Manca kick good	10	14
"TOP" = time of possession. For other American football terms, see Glossary of American football.							10	14

=== Statistics ===
	1	2	3	4	Total
No. 1 Hurricanes	0	7	0	3	10
No. 2 Nittany Lions	0	7	0	7	14

Statistics	MIA	PSU
First downs	22	8
Plays–yards	93–445	59–162
Rushes–yards	43–160	43–109
Passing yards	285	53
Passing: comp–att–int	26–50–5	5–16–1
Turnovers		
Time of possession	33:43	26:17

Team	Category	Player	Statistics
MIA	Passing	Vinny Testaverde	26-50, 285 yds, 5 int
MIA	Rushing	Alonzo Highsmith	18-119 yds
MIA	Receiving	Brian Blades	5-81 yds
PSU	Passing	John Shaffer	5-16, 53 yds, 1 int
PSU	Rushing	D.J. Dozier	20-99 yds
PSU	Receiving	Eric Hamilton	1-23 yds
