= John Rienstra =

American football player (born 1963)

No. 79, 70
- Position: Guard

Personal information
- Born: March 22, 1963 (age 63); Grand Rapids, Michigan, U.S.
- Listed height: 6 ft 5 in (1.96 m)
- Listed weight: 273 lb (124 kg)

Career information
- High school: Academy of the New Church Secondary Schools (Bryn Athyn, Pennsylvania)
- College: Temple
- NFL draft: 1986: 1st round, 9th overall pick

Career history
- Pittsburgh Steelers (1986–1990); Cleveland Browns (1991–1992)

Awards and highlights
- Consensus All-American (1985); 2× First-team All-East (1984, 1985)

Career NFL statistics
- Games played: 65
- Games started: 48
- Fumble recoveries: 3
- Stats at Pro Football Reference

John William Rienstra (born March 22, 1963) is an American former professional football player who was a guard for seven seasons in the National Football League (NFL) for the Pittsburgh Steelers and Cleveland Browns. Rienstra attended Temple University after graduating from the Academy of the New Church Secondary Schools.

At the 1986 NFL draft, the Steelers selected Rienstra with the ninth overall pick in the first round.

On July 6, 2016, Rienstra discovered the remains of Joe Keller, a man from Cleveland, Tennessee, who had gone missing while on a jog on July 23, 2015, in a remote and rugged area of the Rio Grande National Forest in Conejos County, Colorado.
