= Tim Pidgeon =

American football player (born 1964)

No. 94
- Position: Linebacker

Personal information
- Born: September 20, 1964 (age 62); Oneonta, New York, U.S.
- Listed height: 6 ft 0 in (1.83 m)
- Listed weight: 233 lb (106 kg)

Career information
- High school: Oneonta
- College: Syracuse
- NFL draft: 1987: 9th round, 237th overall pick

Career history
- Miami Dolphins (1987); Tampa Bay Buccaneers (1988)*
- * Offseason or practice squad member only

Awards and highlights
- 2× Second-team All-East (1985, 1986)

Career NFL statistics
- Fumble recoveries: 1
- Stats at Pro Football Reference

Tim Pidgeon (born September 20, 1964) is an American former professional football player who was a linebacker for the Miami Dolphins of the National Football League (NFL) in 1987. He played college football for the Syracuse Orange.
