= Tim Green =

American football player (born 1963)

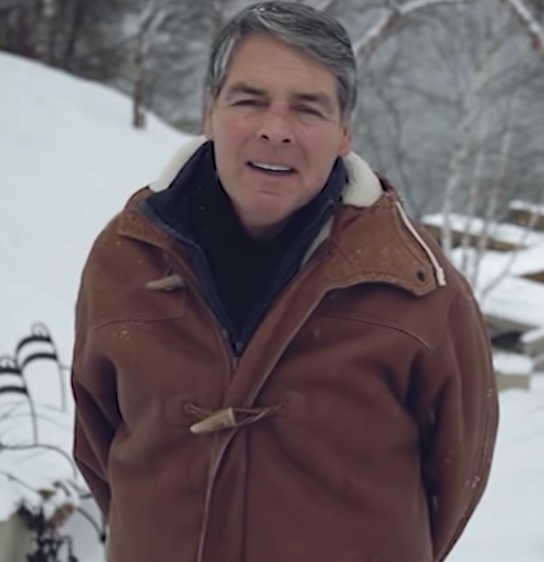
- Green in November 2018
- Born: December 16, 1963 (age 62); Liverpool, New York, U.S.
- Occupations: Sports commentator, attorney, author, former linebacker
- Years active: 1991–present
- Football career

No. 99
- Positions: Linebacker, defensive end

Personal information
- Listed height: 6 ft 2 in (1.88 m)
- Listed weight: 249 lb (113 kg)

Career information
- High school: Liverpool (NY)
- College: Syracuse
- NFL draft: 1986: 1st round, 17th overall pick

Career history
- Atlanta Falcons (1986–1993)

Awards and highlights
- Unanimous All-American (1985); Third-team All-American (1984); 3× First-team All-East (1983, 1984, 1985); Syracuse Orange No. 72 retired

Career NFL statistics
- Quarterback sacks: 24
- Safeties: 1
- Stats at Pro Football Reference
- College Football Hall of Fame
- Website: www.timgreenbooks.com

Timothy John Green (born December 16, 1963) is an American former professional football player, attorney, radio and television personality, and a best-selling author. He was a linebacker and defensive end with the Atlanta Falcons of the National Football League (NFL), a commentator for National Public Radio, and the former host of the 2005 revival of A Current Affair produced by 20th Television. In November 2018, Green announced that he was diagnosed with ALS.

== Football and television career ==
Green graduated from Liverpool High School in 1982 and attended nearby Syracuse University. He graduated summa cum laude in 1986, and from SU's College of Law in 1994. He was named a two-time Academic All-American. Green was a first-round selection in the 1986 NFL draft, taken 17th overall by the Atlanta Falcons. Green would play for eight seasons with the Falcons before retiring after the 1993 season.

Following his eight-year playing career, Green began his career in broadcasting. Serving as a commentator for the NFL on Fox, Comedy Central's BattleBots and on NPR before moving on to host the brief 2005 revival of A Current Affair and later on the American version of the Australian show Find My Family with Lisa Joyner in 2009.

In December 2011, Green was named a winner of the NCAA Silver Anniversary Award, given annually to six former NCAA student-athletes for distinguished career accomplishment on the 25th anniversary of their college graduation.

== Writing career ==
Since his retirement from football, Green had written nearly forty novels ranging from adult suspense to youth sports. His youth sports series in particular would become his best selling works as an author, with many of his works reaching The New York Times best-seller list of children's chapter books. He serves on the National Writer's Project Writing Council.

== Legal career ==
As an attorney, Green has been of counsel with the law firm Barclay Damon LLP in New York State since February 1999. He has assisted in growing and developing the firm's client base, focusing on energy and intellectual property.

== Podcast ==
Green hosts a podcast called "Tim Green's Nothing Left Unsaid", which is unique in its use of advanced AI voice cloning technology by ElevenLabs. The podcast employs an AI voice cloned from Green's old recordings, allowing him to communicate and conduct deep conversations with various guests despite him having lost much of his voice and movement to ALS. The podcast explores themes such as religion, personal beliefs, and transitions in faith, featuring notable figures from various fields and contributing to important discussions on contemporary issues.

Notable guests include Troy Aikman, Joe Buck, Brian Kilmeade, Merit Cudkowicz, Bill Goldberg, John Driskell Hopkins, Howard Lutnick, Bob Costas, Arthur Blank, Lesley Stahl, James Lankford, Adam Fox, Carl Hiaasen, Roger Goodell, Will Cain, Aaron Lazar, Nic Pizzolatto, and Mark Brunell.

== Personal life ==
Green lives in upstate New York with his wife, Illyssa, five children, and three dogs.

Green was diagnosed with a slow-progressing form of amyotrophic lateral sclerosis in 2016 at age 53, a diagnosis he did not reveal publicly until November 14, 2018, in a Facebook post. He was featured on the November 18 edition of 60 Minutes and the NFL on Fox's Thanksgiving broadcast on November 22, discussing his life and struggles with the disease.

In response to his diagnosis, Green launched TackleALS, a campaign dedicated to raising funds for ALS research.

== Bibliography ==
=== Fiction ===
- 1993 Ruffians (Turner Publishing)
- 1996 Outlaws
- 1998 The Red Zone
- 1999 Double Reverse
- 1999 Titans
- 2000 The Letter of the Law (Warner Books)
- 2002 The Fourth Perimeter (Warner Books)
- 2003 The Fifth Angel
- 2003 Exact Revenge
- 2004 The First 48
- 2005 Pie
- 2006 Kingdom Come
- 2006 Exact Revenge
- 2007 Football Genius
- 2008 Football Hero
- 2009 Football Champ
- 2009 Hung The Law
- 2009 Baseball Magnific
- 2010 False Alibi
- 2010 Rivals
- 2010 The Big Time
- 2011 Best of the Best
- 2011 Deep Zone
- 2012 Pinch Hit
- 2012 Unstoppable
- 2013 Force Out
- 2013 Perfect Season
- 2014 New Kid
- 2014 Home Run
- 2015 Lost Lad
- 2015 Minor Owner
- 2016 Left Out
- 2017 Baseball Intellectual
- 2018 The Big Game
- 2021 Final Season

=== Non-fiction ===
- 1997 A Man and His Mother: An Adopted Son's Search
- 1997 The Dark Side of the Game: My Life in the NFL
- 2003 The Road to the NFL
