= Travis Curtis =

American football player (1965–2026)

No. 20, 37, 49, 48
- Position: Defensive back

Personal information
- Born: September 27, 1965; Montgomery County, Maryland, U.S.
- Died: January 17, 2026 (aged 60); Montgomery County, Maryland, U.S.
- Listed height: 5 ft 10 in (1.78 m)
- Listed weight: 180 lb (82 kg)

Career information
- High school: Winston Churchill (Potomac, Maryland)
- College: West Virginia

Career history
- St. Louis/Phoenix Cardinals (1987–1988); Washington Redskins (1988); Minnesota Vikings (1989); New York Jets (1990); Washington Redskins (1991)

Awards and highlights
- 3× Second-team All-East (1984, 1985, 1986)
- Stats at Pro Football Reference

Travis Fennell Curtis (September 27, 1965 – January 17, 2026) was an American professional football player who was a defensive back in the National Football League (NFL) for the St. Louis/Phoenix Cardinals, Washington Redskins, Minnesota Vikings, and the New York Jets. He played college football for the West Virginia Mountaineers.

Curtis died on January 17, 2026, at the age of 60.
