= Randy Dixon =

American football player (born 1965)

No. 69
- Positions: Tackle, guard

Personal information
- Born: March 12, 1965 (age 61); Clewiston, Florida, U.S.
- Listed height: 6 ft 3 in (1.91 m)
- Listed weight: 305 lb (138 kg)

Career information
- High school: Clewiston
- College: Pittsburgh
- NFL draft: 1987: 4th round, 86th overall pick

Career history
- Indianapolis Colts (1987–1995)

Awards and highlights
- Consensus All-American (1986); 2× First-team All-East (1985, 1986); Second-team All-East (1984)

Career NFL statistics
- Games played: 118
- Games started: 110
- Touchdowns: 1
- Stats at Pro Football Reference

Randall Charles Dixon (born March 12, 1965) is an American former professional football player who was a guard in the National Football League (NFL).

Dixon was born in Clewiston, Florida and played scholastically at Clewiston High School. He played collegiately for the Pittsburgh Panthers, where, as a junior, he was recognized as a consensus All-American.

Pre-draft measurables
Height	Weight	Arm length	Hand span	40-yard dash	10-yard split	20-yard split	20-yard shuttle	Vertical jump	Broad jump	Bench press
6 ft 3 5/8 in (1.92 m)	292 lb (132 kg)	33 1/4 in (0.84 m)	9 1/2 in (0.24 m)	5.28 s	1.82 s	3.12 s	5.17 s	25.0 in (0.64 m)	7 ft 6 in (2.29 m)	24 reps
All values from NFL Combine

Dixon was selected by the Indianapolis Colts in the fourth-round of the 1987 NFL draft. He spent his entire nine-year career with the Colts, becoming a full-time starter in his second season.
