= Mike Ruth =

American football player (born 1964)

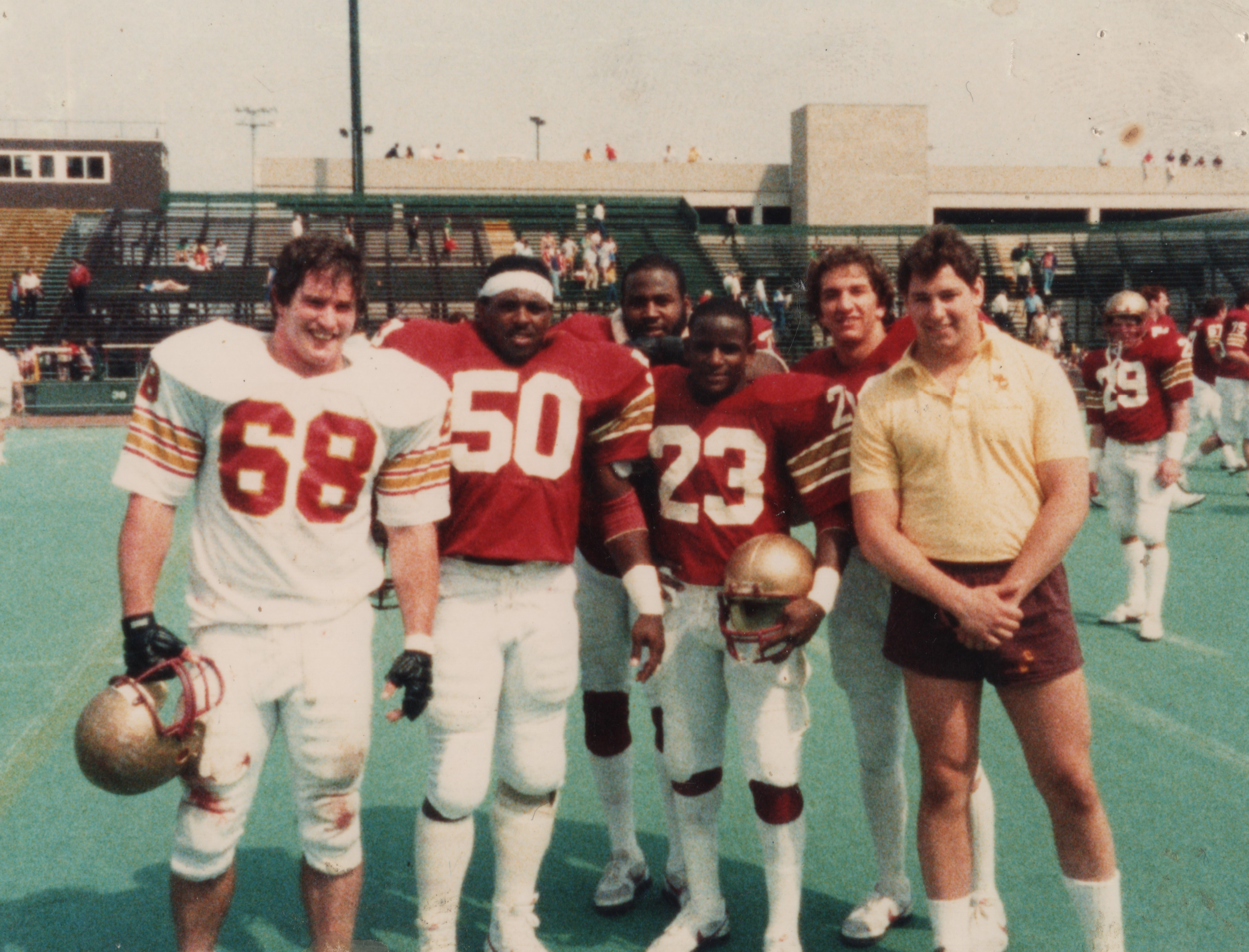
- Mike Ruth (No. 68) with his BC teammates circa 1984

No. 65, 62
- Position: Defensive tackle

Personal information
- Born: June 25, 1964 (age 62); Norristown, Pennsylvania, U.S.
- Listed height: 6 ft 2 in (1.88 m)
- Listed weight: 266 lb (121 kg)

Career information
- High school: Methacton (Fairview Village, Pennsylvania)
- College: Boston College (1982–1985)
- NFL draft: 1986: 2nd round, 42nd overall pick

Career history
- New England Patriots (1986–1987); Houston Oilers (1989)*; Barcelona Dragons (1991–1992)
- * Offseason or practice squad member only

Awards and highlights
- Outland Trophy (1985); Consensus All-American (1985); 3× First-team All-East (1983, 1984, 1985); Boston College Eagles No. 68 retired

Career NFL statistics
- Sacks: 1
- Fumble recoveries: 1
- Stats at Pro Football Reference
- College Football Hall of Fame

Michael Joseph Ruth (born June 25, 1964) is an American former professional football player who was a defensive tackle in the National Football League (NFL). He played college football for the Boston College Eagles, winning the Outland Trophy as college football's best lineman in 1985. After two seasons in the National Football League (NFL) with the New England Patriots, who drafted him in the second round of the 1986 NFL Draft, he finished his professional football career with the Barcelona Dragons of the World League of American Football (WLAF) in 1991 and 1992.

Ruth was inducted to the College Football Hall of Fame in December 2017. He is the 10th former Boston College player or coach enshrined in the National Football Foundation College Football Hall of Fame.

== Personal life ==
He later graduated from Harvard University with a M.Ed. and is now a teacher at Everett High School in Massachusetts.
