= Brian Jozwiak =

American football player (born 1963)

No. 73
- Positions: Guard, tackle

Personal information
- Born: June 20, 1963 (age 63); Baltimore, Maryland, U.S.
- Listed height: 6 ft 6 in (1.98 m)
- Listed weight: 304 lb (138 kg)

Career information
- High school: Catonsville (MD)
- College: West Virginia
- NFL draft: 1986: 1st round, 7th overall pick

Career history

Playing
- Kansas City Chiefs (1986–1988)

Coaching
- West Virginia Wesleyan (1991–?) Defensive line coach; West Virginia Wesleyan (c. 1995–1998) Offensive line coach

Awards and highlights
- PFWA All-Rookie Team (1986); Consensus All-American (1985); Second-team All-American (1984); 2× First-team All-East (1984, 1985)

Career NFL statistics
- Games played: 28
- Games started: 3
- Stats at Pro Football Reference

Brian Joseph Jozwiak (born June 20, 1963) is an American former professional football player who was an offensive lineman for the Kansas City Chiefs of the National Football League (NFL). He played college football for the West Virginia Mountaineers.

== Early life ==
Jozwiak was born in Catonsville, Maryland. He began his football career as a defensive tackle in the Baltimore area. Jozwiak earned honorable-mention all-metro player honors while playing for Catonsville High School.

== College career ==
When enrolling at the West Virginia University, Mountaineers' coach Don Nehlen moved Jozwiak from defensive tackle to offensive lineman. Jozwiak not only led the way for West Virginia ballcarriers, but blocked for Mountaineer quarterback Jeff Hostetler. In 1985, Jozwiak was named a consensus All-American, the sixth Mountaineer ever such honored at that time. He was also named a second-team All-American by the Associated Press in 1983.

== Professional career ==
Jozwiak was selected in the first round, seventh overall of the 1986 NFL draft by the Kansas City Chiefs. He played three professional seasons before suffering a career-ending hip injury.

== Post-football ==
As of 2015, Jowziak is residing in North Port, Florida and is a HOPE & PE teacher at North Port High School.
