= Joe McCall (American football) =

American football player (born 1962)

No. 43
- Position: Running back

Personal information
- Born: February 17, 1962 (age 64); Miami, Florida, U.S.
- Listed height: 5 ft 11 in (1.80 m)
- Listed weight: 205 lb (93 kg)

Career information
- High school: Jackson (Miami)
- College: Pittsburgh (1980–1983)
- NFL draft: 1984: 3rd round, 84th overall pick

Career history
- Los Angeles Raiders (1984); Tampa Bay Buccaneers (1985)*
- * Offseason or practice squad member only

Awards and highlights
- Second-team All-East (1983)

Career NFL statistics
- Rushing attempts: 1
- Rushing yards: 3
- Rushing average: 3
- Stats at Pro Football Reference

Joseph Shepard McCall (born February 17, 1962) is an American former professional football player who was a running back in the National Football League (NFL) for the Los Angeles Raiders, who selected him 84th overall in the third round of the 1984 NFL draft. He played college football at the University of Pittsburgh.
