= Tony Woods (American football, born 1965) =

American football player (born 1965)

No. 57, 91, 98
- Positions: Linebacker, defensive end

Personal information
- Born: September 11, 1965 (age 61); Newark, New Jersey, U.S.
- Listed height: 6 ft 4 in (1.93 m)
- Listed weight: 282 lb (128 kg)

Career information
- High school: West Orange (NJ) Seton Hall
- College: Pittsburgh
- NFL draft: 1987: 1st round, 18th overall pick

Career history
- Seattle Seahawks (1987–1992); Los Angeles Rams (1993); Washington Redskins (1994–1996)

Awards and highlights
- Consensus All-American (1986); First-team All-East (1986); Second-team All-East (1985)

Career NFL statistics
- Tackles: 697
- Sacks: 24.5
- Fumble recoveries: 8
- Touchdowns: 1
- Stats at Pro Football Reference

Stanley Anthony Woods (born October 11, 1965) is an American former professional football player who was a linebacker and defensive end in the National Football League (NFL) for the Seattle Seahawks from 1987 to 1992, as well as the Los Angeles Rams and the Washington Redskins. He played college football at the University of Pittsburgh.

== Early life ==
Woods was born in Newark, New Jersey and played high school football at Seton Hall Preparatory School. While at Seton Hall, he was first-team All-State, first-team Parade All-American and first-team All-USA Today All-American his senior year. He played in two consecutive state football championship games, and his junior year team was undefeated (11-0), and ranked third in the state.

== College career ==
Woods attended and played college football at the University of Pittsburgh. As a senior, he had 109 tackles, including 18 tackles against Rutgers University. He finished his career as a Consensus All-American with 242 tackles and 31 sacks.

== Professional career ==
=== USFL ===
Woods has the distinction of being the last player ever drafted by the United States Football League. With one year of college eligibility remaining, he was selected 92nd by the Houston Gamblers in the 12th round of the 1986 USFL draft.

=== NFL ===
Woods was selected in the first round with the 18th overall pick in the 1987 NFL draft by the Seattle Seahawks. He played in Seattle from 1987 to 1992. In 1993, he was cut by the Seahawks at the end of training camp and signed with the Los Angeles Rams, where he played for one season. Woods then signed with the Washington Redskins, where he finished his career.

== Personal life ==
After retiring, Woods became a football coach. He was defensive coordinator on the first state football championship team at West Side High School in 2007. He then spent time as the defensive line coach at William Paterson University. He is currently an assistant coach at Seton Hall Prep in West Orange, where he attended high school.
