= Shane Conlan =

American football player and administrator (born 1964)

No. 58, 56
- Position: Linebacker

Personal information
- Born: March 4, 1964 (age 62); Frewsburg, New York, U.S.
- Listed height: 6 ft 3 in (1.91 m)
- Listed weight: 235 lb (107 kg)

Career information
- High school: Frewsburg
- College: Penn State
- NFL draft: 1987: 1st round, 8th overall pick

Career history

Playing
- Buffalo Bills (1987–1992); Los Angeles / St. Louis Rams (1993–1995)

Operations
- Pittsburgh Power (2013–2014) Vice president of corporate partnerships

Awards and highlights
- AP NFL Defensive Rookie of The Year (1987); 3× Second-team All-Pro (1987, 1988, 1990); 3× Pro Bowl (1988–1990); PFWA All-Rookie Team (1987); Buffalo Bills 50th Anniversary Team; 2× National champion (1982, 1986); Unanimous All-American (1986); First-team All-American (1985); 2× First-team All-East (1985, 1986); Fiesta Bowl Defensive MVP (1987)

Career NFL statistics
- Tackles: 783
- Sacks: 7
- Forced fumbles: 6
- Fumble recoveries: 5
- Interceptions: 5
- Stats at Pro Football Reference
- College Football Hall of Fame

Shane Patrick Conlan (born March 4, 1964) is an American former professional football player who was a linebacker in the National Football League (NFL). He played college football for the Penn State Nittany Lions, winning two national championships in 1982 and 1986, although he was red-shirted prior to the start of the 1982 season and did not play that season. In 1981, prior to his Penn State career and after his senior season at Frewsburg High School in which he played under head coach Thomas Sharp, Conlan was voted Western New York high school Player of the Year. During his career at Penn State, Conlan had 274 tackles, including a school-record 186 solos. He finished his football career as a three-time all-pro with the NFL's Buffalo Bills and the Los Angeles/St. Louis Rams.

== Early life ==
Conlan was born and raised in Frewsburg, New York.

== College career ==
Conlan capped his junior season at Penn State in the 1985 national championship game in the Orange Bowl against the University of Oklahoma. The finale to his senior year was in the 1986 national championship game versus the University of Miami in the 1987 Fiesta Bowl, Conlan had eight tackles, two interceptions. Most memorably, he returned the second of his two interceptions 38 yards to the Miami 5-yard line to set up D.J. Dozier's game-winning touchdown. With Penn State's 14–10 victory, Conlan's squad completed an undefeated season, securing the 1986 national championship.

As captain, Conlan led the 1986 squad in tackles with 79, including a team-high 63 solo stops. During his final two collegiate seasons (1985 & 1986), he was named an All-American at outside linebacker, making him the sixth two-time All-American at Penn State. He received this honor from NEA in 1985 and from Walter Camp, The Football News, Football Writers, Football Coaches, Associated Press, United Press International, and College and Pro Football Newsweekly in 1986. In addition, Conlan was a 1986 finalist for the prestigious Butkus Award as the nation's top linebacker. He was elected to the College Football Hall of Fame in 2014.

On December 11, 2014, the Big Ten Network included Conlan on "The Mount Rushmore of Penn State Football", as chosen by online fan voting. Conlan was joined in the honor by John Cappelletti, Jack Ham and LaVar Arrington.

== Professional career ==
Conlan was selected in the first round with the eighth overall pick by the Buffalo Bills in the 1987 NFL draft. After his rookie season, he was awarded the 1987 NFL Defensive Rookie of the Year by the Associated Press. From 1988 to 1990, Conlan enjoyed three straight trips to the Pro Bowl. Conlan played with the Bills (1987–92), where he played in the first 3 of the Bills Super Bowl teams and the Los Angeles/St. Louis Rams (1993–95) before retiring from the NFL in 1995.

== NFL career statistics ==
=== Regular season ===
Legend
	Led the league
**Bold**	Career high

Year	Team	Games		Tackles					Fumbles				Interceptions			
Year	Team	GP	GS	Sck	Cmb	Solo	Ast	Sfty	FF	FR	Yds	TD	Int	Yds	TD	PD
1987	BUF	12	12	0.5	114	114	—	0	0	0	0	0	0	0	0	0
1988	BUF	13	13	1.5	84	84	—	0	**1**	1	0	0	**1**	0	0	0
1989	BUF	10	9	1.0	50	50	—	0	**1**	0	0	0	**1**	0	0	0
1990	BUF	16	16	1.0	93	93	—	0	0	0	0	0	0	0	0	0
1991	BUF	16	15	0.0	**122**	**122**	—	0	**1**	**2**	0	0	0	0	0	0
1992	BUF	13	12	**2.0**	82	82	—	0	0	0	0	0	**1**	7	0	0
1993	LAR	12	11	0.0	75	75	—	0	0	0	0	0	**1**	**28**	0	0
1994	LAR	15	15	1.0	108	84	**24**	0	**1**	0	0	0	0	0	0	0
1995	STL	13	11	0.0	55	47	8	0	**1**	**2**	0	0	**1**	1	0	0
Career		120	114	7.0	783	751	32	0	5	5	0	0	5	36	0	0

=== Postseason ===
Year	Team	Games		Tackles					Fumbles				Interceptions			
Year	Team	GP	GS	Sck	Cmb	Solo	Ast	Sfty	FF	FR	Yds	TD	Int	Yds	TD	PD
1988	BUF	1	1	0.0	0	0	—	0	0	0	0	0	0	0	0	0
1989	BUF	1	1	0.0	0	0	—	0	0	0	0	0	0	0	0	0
1990	BUF	3	3	0.0	**5**	**5**	—	0	0	0	0	0	0	0	0	0
1991	BUF	3	3	0.0	0	0	—	0	0	0	0	0	0	0	0	0
1992	BUF	4	4	0.0	0	0	—	0	0	0	0	0	0	0	0	0
Career		12	12	0.0	5	5	—	0	0	0	0	0	0	0	0	0

== After football ==
Since Conlan's retirement from the NFL, he has worked for Esmark Inc. as the company's Vice President of Commercial Real Estate. In 2013, he was named the Pittsburgh Power's Vice President of Corporate Partnerships.

Conlan has four children, including Patrick (b.1992), a former NCAA division III college quarterback (Hobart University), son Chris (b. 1997), an NCAA division I Wide Receiver (William & Mary), and son Dan (b. 2000), an NCAA division I basketball player (Penn State).
