= Al Wenglikowski =

American football player (born 1960)

No. 60
- Position: Linebacker

Personal information
- Born: August 3, 1960 (age 66); Burlington, Iowa, U.S.
- Listed height: 6 ft 1 in (1.85 m)
- Listed weight: 215 lb (98 kg)

Career information
- High school: Franklin (OH)
- College: Pittsburgh
- NFL draft: 1984: 10th round, 258 (by the Kansas City Chiefs)th overall pick

Career history
- Kansas City Chiefs (1984)*; Buffalo Bills (1984, 1987)
- * Offseason or practice squad member only

Awards and highlights
- First-team All-East (1983); Second-team All-East (1982)
- Stats at Pro Football Reference

Al Wenglikowski (born August 3, 1960) is an American former professional football linebacker. He played for the Buffalo Bills in 1984 and 1987.
