= Ben Tamburello =

American football player (born 1964)

No. 61
- Positions: Guard, center

Personal information
- Born: September 9, 1964 (age 62); Birmingham, Alabama, U.S.
- Listed height: 6 ft 3 in (1.91 m)
- Listed weight: 278 lb (126 kg)

Career information
- High school: Shades Valley (Irondale, Alabama)
- College: Auburn
- NFL draft: 1987: 3rd round, 65th overall pick

Career history
- Philadelphia Eagles (1987–1991)

Awards and highlights
- Unanimous All-American (1986); SEC Lineman of the Year award (1986); First-team All-SEC (1986)

Career NFL statistics
- Games played: 50
- Games started: 11
- Fumble recoveries: 1
- Stats at Pro Football Reference

Ben Allen Tamburello Jr. (born September 9, 1964) is an American former professional football player who was a guard and center for five seasons in the National Football League (NFL). He played for the Philadelphia Eagles from 1987 to 1991. He was selected by the Eagles in the third round of the 1987 NFL draft. He played college football for the Auburn Tigers.

== Early life ==
Tamburello was born in Birmingham, Alabama. He attended Shades Valley High School in Homewood, Alabama, and Tennessee Military Institute in Sweetwater, Tennessee.

== College career ==
Tamburello was recruited by Paul "Bear" Bryant to play college football for the Alabama Crimson Tide, but decided to play for Auburn. He played for the Tigers from 1983 to 1986. In 1986, he was named a unanimous All-American. He won the SEC Lineman of the Year award in 1986 and was named a team captain.

== Professional career ==
=== Philadelphia Eagles ===
Tamburello was selected by the Philadelphia Eagles in the third round (65th overall) of the 1987 NFL draft. He played for the Eagles from 1987 to 1991.

== After football ==
Tamburello works in real estate and resides in Birmingham with his wife, Katy, and his three children: Ben III, Anna and Julia.
