= Steve Trapilo =

American football player (1964–2004)

No. 65
- Position: Guard

Personal information
- Born: September 20, 1964; Boston, Massachusetts, U.S.
- Died: May 21, 2004 (aged 39); Effingham, New Hampshire, U.S.
- Listed height: 6 ft 5 in (1.96 m)
- Listed weight: 281 lb (127 kg)

Career information
- High school: Boston College High School
- College: Boston College
- NFL draft: 1987: 4th round, 96th overall pick

Career history
- New Orleans Saints (1987–1992); New England Patriots (1993)*
- * Offseason or practice squad member only

Awards and highlights
- Second-team All-American (1986); First-team All-East (1986); 2× Second-team All-East (1984, 1985)

Career NFL statistics
- Games played: 57
- Games started: 52
- Fumble recoveries: 1
- Stats at Pro Football Reference

Stephen Paul Trapilo (September 20, 1964 – May 21, 2004) was an American professional football player who was a guard in the National Football League (NFL).

Trapilo was born in Boston, Massachusetts, and played scholastically at Boston College High School. He played collegiately for the Boston College Eagles, where he was honored by the Associated Press and United Press International as a second-team All-American as a senior.

== Professional career ==
Trapilo was selected by the New Orleans Saints in the fourth round (96th overall) of the 1987 NFL draft. He spent four seasons with the Saints, starting all 16 games in 1989 and 1990. He joined them again for the 1992 season, after not playing in 1991.

Pre-draft measurables
Height	Weight	Arm length	Hand span	40-yard dash	10-yard split	20-yard split	20-yard shuttle	Vertical jump	Broad jump	Bench press
6 ft 4 1/2 in (1.94 m)	284 lb (129 kg)	32 1/2 in (0.83 m)	10 1/4 in (0.26 m)	5.22 s	1.74 s	3.03 s	4.91 s	23.5 in (0.60 m)	8 ft 1 in (2.46 m)	26 reps

== Personal life ==
Trapilo's son Ozzy was as an offensive tackle at Boston College. Ozzy was selected by the Chicago Bears with the 56th pick in the 2025 NFL draft.

== Death ==
Trapilo died of a heart attack on May 21, 2004, while on vacation with his family in Effingham, New Hampshire.
