= Mike Zordich =

American football player and coach (born 1963)

Youngstown State Penguins football
- Title: Defensive backs coach

Personal information
- Born: October 12, 1963 (age 63); Youngstown, Ohio, U.S.
- Listed height: 6 ft 1 in (1.85 m)
- Listed weight: 212 lb (96 kg)

Career information
- High school: Chaney (Youngstown)
- College: Penn State (1982–1985)
- NFL draft: 1986: 9th round, 235th overall pick

Career history

Playing
- San Diego Chargers (1986)*; New York Jets (1987–1988); Phoenix Cardinals (1989–1993); Philadelphia Eagles (1994–1998)
- * Offseason or practice squad member only

Coaching
- Cardinal Mooney (2003–2008) Defensive assistant; Philadelphia Eagles (2009–2010) Defensive quality control coach; Philadelphia Eagles (2011–2012) Safeties coach; Youngstown State (2014) Safeties coach; Michigan (2015–2020) Defensive backs coach; Central Michigan (2021–2024) Defensive backs coach; Youngstown State (2025–present) Safeties coach

Awards and highlights
- National champion (1982); Sugar Bowl champion (1982); First-team All-American (1985); 2× First-team All-East (1984, 1985)

Career NFL statistics
- Total tackles: 588
- Interceptions: 20
- Sacks: 6
- FF / FR: 6 / 11
- Touchdowns: 4
- Stats at Pro Football Reference

Michael Edward Zordich (born October 12, 1963) is an American college football coach and former professional player who was recently the defensive backs coach for the Central Michigan Chippewas. He played 12 seasons in the National Football League (NFL). Zordich played collegiately for the Penn State Nittany Lions and was selected by the San Diego Chargers in the ninth round (235th overall) of the 1986 NFL draft.

Zordich played as a cornerback and safety in the NFL and subsequently became a coach. He has coached for Cardinal Mooney High School, the Philadelphia Eagles, Youngstown State, and Michigan.

== College career ==
Zordich attended Chaney High School prior to enrolling at Penn State University. At Penn State, he was a four-year letterman and a starter at "hero". As a senior, in 1985, he was selected as an All-American by the Football Writers Association of America. He was also a team co-captain. He finished his career with 201 tackles and earned a B. S. in hotel, restaurant, and institutional management.

== Professional career ==
Zordich was selected by the San Diego Chargers in the ninth round (235 overall) of the 1986 NFL draft. He was released by the Chargers at the end of 1986 pre-season. In April 1987, he was signed by the New York Jets. During final cuts, he was waived by the Jets. He was re-signed on September 15. In 1987, he appeared in 10 games, primarily on special teams. He recorded eight tackles, and one sack. In 1988, he appeared in 16 games. He recorded 10 tackles and one interception.

In February 1989, Zordich was declared an unconditional free agent by the Jets. In March, he was signed by the Phoenix Cardinals in 1989. In 1989, he appeared in 16 games (seven starts). He recorded 60 tackles, one sack, and one interceptions. In 1990, he appeared in 16 games. He recorded 27 tackles, one fumble recovery, and one interceptions. In 1991, he started all 16 games. He recorded, a career-high, 87 tackles, as well as three fumble recoveries, and one interception. In 1992, he started all 16 games. He recorded 61 tackles, and three interceptions. In 1993, his final season in Phoenix, he appeared in 16 games (nine starts). He recorded 54 tackles, two forced fumbles, and one interception.

In June 1994, Zordich signed with the Philadelphia Eagles, signing a two-year $800,000 contract, where he replaced Andre Waters who left Philadelphia to sign with the, then newly renamed, Arizona Cardinals. In 1994, Zordich started all 16 games. He recorded 51 tackles, one sack, two forced fumbles, three fumble recoveries, and a career-high four interceptions. In 1995, he started 15 games, missing one. He recorded 60 tackles, one sack, two forced fumbles as well as two fumble recoveries, and one interception. In 1996, he started all 16 games. He recorded 64 tackles, and four interceptions. In 1997, he started all 16 games. He recorded 51 tackles, a career-high two sacks, one fumble recovery, and one interceptions. In his final season, 1998, he started all 16 games. He recorded 55 tackles, one fumble recovery, and two interceptions. After the season, his contract expired and he was not re-signed. In 1999, he was replaced by Tim Hauck.

After appearing in his first career game in 1987 with the Jets, Zordich missed just one game in his career.

=== Career statistics ===
Season				Tackles							Pass defense		
Year	Team	GP	GS	Solo.	Asst.	Total	Sacks	FF	FR	TD	Int.	Yds.	TD
1987	NYJ	10	0	--	--	8	1	0	0	0	0	0	0
1988	NYJ	16	0	--	--	10	0	0	0	0	1	35	1
1989	PHX	16	7	--	--	60	1	0	0	0	1	16	1
1990	PHX	16	0	--	--	27	0	0	1	0	1	25	0
1991	PHX	16	16	--	--	87	0	0	3	0	1	27	0
1992	PHX	16	16	--	--	61	0	0	0	0	3	37	0
1993	PHX	16	9	--	--	54	0	2	0	0	1	0	0
1994	PHI	16	16	24	27	51	1	2	3	0	4	39	1
1995	PHI	15	15	46	14	60	1	2	2	1	1	10	0
1996	PHI	16	16	32	32	64	0	0	0	0	4	54	0
1997	PHI	16	16	22	29	51	2	0	1	0	1	21	0
1998	PHI	16	16	27	28	55	0	0	1	0	2	18	0
Career		185	127	--	--	588	6	6	11	1	20	282	3

== Coaching career ==
In 2003, Zordich became a defensive assistant at Cardinal Mooney High School, he coached there for six seasons. In 2009, he joined the Philadelphia Eagles as the team's defensive quality control coach, for two seasons. In 2011, he was named the Eagles' safeties coach. In 2014, he was named Youngstown State's safeties coach. After the season, in January 2015, he was hired by the University of Michigan. Zordich was fired from Michigan on January 13, 2021, after six seasons as the defensive backs coach.

== Personal life ==
Zordich lives in Ann Arbor, Michigan with his wife Cynthia, a photographer. His son Michael Jr. played running back for the Nittany Lions and later the Carolina Panthers, and another son, Alex, played quarterback for the University at Buffalo, he also has a daughter, Aiden.
