= Rogers Alexander =

American football player (born 1964)

No. 51, 91
- Position: Linebacker

Personal information
- Born: August 11, 1964 (age 62); Washington, D. C., U.S.
- Listed height: 6 ft 3 in (1.91 m)
- Listed weight: 222 lb (101 kg)

Career information
- High school: DeMatha Catholic
- College: Penn State
- NFL draft: 1986: 4th round, 105th overall pick

Career history
- New York Jets (1986); New England Patriots (1987); Indianapolis Colts (1988)*
- * Offseason or practice squad member only

Awards and highlights
- National champion (1982); First-team All-East (1985)
- Stats at Pro Football Reference

Rogers Bernard Alexander (born August 11, 1964) is an American former professional football player who was a linebacker in the National Football League (NFL) for the New York Jets and New England Patriots. He played college football for the Penn State Nittany Lions. He was selected by the Jets in the fourth round of the 1986 NFL draft with the 105th overall pick.
