= Tim Johnson (defensive lineman) =

American football player and pastor (born 1965)

No. 78, 90
- Positions: Defensive end, defensive tackle

Personal information
- Born: January 29, 1965 (age 61); Sarasota, Florida, U.S.
- Listed height: 6 ft 3 in (1.91 m)
- Listed weight: 286 lb (130 kg)

Career information
- High school: Sarasota
- College: Penn State
- NFL draft: 1987: 6th round, 141st overall pick

Career history
- Pittsburgh Steelers (1987–1989); Washington Redskins (1990–1995); Cincinnati Bengals (1996)

Awards and highlights
- Super Bowl champion (XXVI); National champion (1986); First-team All-American (1986); Third-team All-American (1985); 2× First-team All-East (1985, 1986); Fiesta Bowl champion (1987)

Career NFL statistics
- Tackles: 480
- Sacks: 31.5
- Fumble recoveries: 4
- Stats at Pro Football Reference

Timothy Johnson (born January 29, 1965) is an American pastor and former professional football player. He played as a defensive lineman in the National Football League (NFL). After his football career, he became the senior pastor at World Outreach Center in Orlando, Florida.

== College career ==
A standout defensive lineman at Penn State from 1983 to 1986, Johnson was named a third-team All-American as a junior. His senior year, he was a first-team selection, racking up 33 tackles and 5 sacks. He was a key member of the Nittany Lions' 1986 National Championship team.

He earned a Bachelor of Arts in liberal arts from Penn State in 1987.

== Professional career ==
Pre-draft measurables
Height	Weight	Arm length	Hand span	40-yard dash	10-yard split	20-yard split	20-yard shuttle	Vertical jump	Broad jump	Bench press
6 ft 2 in (1.88 m)	253 lb (115 kg)	31 1/4 in (0.79 m)	9 1/4 in (0.23 m)	5.03 s	1.71 s	2.90 s	4.56 s	25.0 in (0.64 m)	8 ft 4 in (2.54 m)	20 reps
All values from NFL Combine

Johnson was selected by the Pittsburgh Steelers in the sixth round (#141 overall) of the 1987 NFL draft, where he played for three seasons. In five seasons with the Washington Redskins, Johnson played on the 1991 World Championship team, earning a Super Bowl ring in Super Bowl XXVI. In 1992 he was selected to the Pro Bowl, and the following year he was elected the 1993 Redskin of the year.

== Ministry ==
In 1992, Johnson joined with former Redskin teammates Art Monk, Charles Mann, and Earnest Byner to found The Good Samaritan Foundation, a philanthropic organization sponsoring various community events in Washington, D.C. inner-city, community centers and homeless shelters. In July 2000 he was ordained into the ministry, and is currently serving as senior pastor at Bethel World Outreach Center in Brentwood, Tennessee. In 2007, Johnson and his family moved to Orlando, Florida, to start the Orlando World Outreach Center church. Since then, he has reached over 10,000 people, once walking across Florida for three weeks.

== Personal ==
He and his wife Le’Chelle currently live in Orlando, Florida, along with their three daughters, Christa, Kayla, Karrah and one son, Shaun. He is the pastor of Orlando World Outreach Center.
