= Duffy Cobbs =

German gridiron football player (born 1964)

No. 43
- Position: Defensive back

Personal information
- Born: January 17, 1964 (age 62); Bad Kreuznach, Germany
- Listed height: 5 ft 11 in (1.80 m)
- Listed weight: 178 lb (81 kg)

Career information
- High school: Groveton (Alexandria, Virginia, U.S.)
- College: Penn State
- NFL draft: 1987: undrafted

Career history
- New England Patriots (1987)

Awards and highlights
- 2× National champion (1982, 1986); First-team All-East (1986)
- Stats at Pro Football Reference

Robert Stephen "Duffy" Cobbs (born January 17, 1964) is a German-born former professional football player. He played defensive back for Penn State's 1982 and 1986 national championship teams, and one season (1987) in the National Football League (NFL) for the New England Patriots.

He was named to Bleacher Report's "Penn State All-Time Defensive Team".
