= Pete Giftopoulos =

Canadian gridiron football player (born 1965)

Profile
- Position: Linebacker

Personal information
- Born: June 14, 1965 (age 61); Hamilton, Ontario, Canada
- Listed height: 6 ft 3 in (1.91 m)
- Listed weight: 240 lb (109 kg)

Career information
- College: Penn State
- CFL draft: 1988: 1st round, 6th overall pick

Career history
- 1988–1995: Hamilton Tiger-Cats

Awards and highlights
- National champion (1986)

Peter Giftopoulos (born June 14, 1965) is a Canadian former professional football linebacker who played eight years for the Hamilton Tiger-Cats of the Canadian Football League (CFL). Giftopoulos played college football at Penn State.

== College career ==
After playing on the defensive line at Cathedral High School in Hamilton, Ontario, Giftopoulos committed to play college football at Penn State as a linebacker. He chose Penn State over Michigan, Notre Dame and Syracuse. After starting his freshman season on the defensive line, Giftopoulos was shifted to tight end. He was later moved to linebacker and gained a starting role before his junior season, earning the spot over Mike Beckish.

Giftopoulos recorded a sack and two interceptions, including the game-sealing pick in the 1987 Fiesta Bowl. During the following spring, he broke his tibia after a teammate fell on it in practice, and a knee injury derailed his senior season.

== Professional career ==
After not being selected in the 1988 NFL draft, Giftopoulos signed with the Pittsburgh Steelers on May 11, 1988. He was released by the Steelers on August 23.

The Saskatchewan Roughriders selected Giftopoulos with the sixth overall pick in the 1988 CFL entry draft. After being cut by the Steelers, Giftopoulos refused to report to practice and asked for a trade.

The Hamilton Tiger-Cats traded for Giftopoulos and a second-round draft selection in exchange for two other players. He initially spent time at linebacker, but then moved to defensive line, then offensive line, then back to linebacker.

== Personal life ==
Pete's father Paul Giftopoulos was a professional soccer player in Greece before immigrating to Canada. Two of Pete's brothers also played college football. Pete also played basketball and soccer in high school and threw shot put.

After his playing career ended, Giftopoulos became a restaurant entrepreneur in Hamilton and later returned to Penn State for kinesiology classes. He married and had children.
