= Daniel Stubbs =

Daniel Stubbs may refer to:

- Daniel P. Stubbs (1829–1905), American politician
- Danny Stubbs (born 1965), American football player
