= Ray Isom =

American football player (born 1965)

No. 28
- Position: Safety

Personal information
- Born: December 27, 1965 (age 60); Harrisburg, Pennsylvania, U.S.
- Listed height: 5 ft 9 in (1.75 m)
- Listed weight: 190 lb (86 kg)

Career information
- High school: Harrisburg
- College: Penn State
- NFL draft: 1987: undrafted

Career history
- Tampa Bay Buccaneers (1987–1988)

Awards and highlights
- National champion (1986); Second-team All-American (1986); First-team All-East (1986)

Career NFL statistics
- Interceptions: 2
- Stats at Pro Football Reference

Raymond Clinton Isom (born December 27, 1965) is an American former professional football player who was a defensive back in the National Football League (NFL).

Isom was born and raised in Harrisburg, Pennsylvania and played scholastically at Harrisburg High School. He played college football at Penn State University, where he was honored by the Associated Press as a second-team All-American as a senior.

Isom signed with the Tampa Bay Buccaneers as an undrafted free agent. He was with the Bucs for the 1987 and 1988 seasons, appearing in eight games with two interceptions.

Isom's brother Rickey also had a short NFL career.
