= John Bruno (American football) =

American football player (1964–1992)

No. 10
- Position: Punter

Personal information
- Born: September 10, 1964; Jeannette, Pennsylvania, U.S.
- Died: April 13, 1992 (aged 27); Pittsburgh, Pennsylvania, U.S.
- Listed height: 6 ft 2 in (1.88 m)
- Listed weight: 190 lb (86 kg)

Career information
- High school: Upper St. Clair (Upper St. Clair, Pennsylvania)
- College: Penn State
- NFL draft: 1987: 5th round, 126th overall pick

Career history
- St. Louis Cardinals (1987)*; Pittsburgh Steelers (1987)
- * Offseason or practice squad member only

Awards and highlights
- National champion (1986); 2× First-team All-East (1985, 1986); Aloha Bowl champion (1983); Fiesta Bowl champion (1987)

Career NFL statistics
- Punts: 16
- Punting yards: 619
- Longest punt: 56
- Stats at Pro Football Reference

John Currie Bruno Jr. (September 10, 1964 – April 13, 1992) was an American professional football punter who played one season for the Pittsburgh Steelers of the National Football League (NFL). He was selected in the fifth round of the 126th pick in the 1987 NFL draft and played college football at Penn State for the Penn State Nittany Lions football where he won the national championship in 1986, the Fiesta Bowl in 1987, and the Aloha Bowl in 1983.

== Early life and education ==
John was born on September 10, 1964, in Jeannette, Pennsylvania, and attended Upper St. Clair High School. A multi-sport athlete, he lettered in football, baseball, and basketball. In football, he earned All-Western Conference honors in 1980 and 1981 and was named All-WPIAL District as a wide receiver during his senior season.

== College Career ==
John enrolled at Penn State University as a walk-on and later earned a scholarship. He became the team’s starting punter and held that role from 1984 through 1986.

During his collegiate career, Bruno was named First-team All-East in both 1985 and 1986. He was a member of Penn State’s 1986 national championship team and participated in victories in the 1983 Aloha Bowl and the 1987 Fiesta Bowl. His punting performance in the Fiesta Bowl contributed to Penn State’s victory over the University of Miami and its second national championship.

== Professional Career ==
John was selected in the fifth round (126th overall) of the 1987 NFL Draft by the St. Louis Cardinals. He later joined the Pittsburgh Steelers and appeared during the 1987 NFL season.

During his professional career, Bruno recorded 16 punts for 619 yards, with a longest punt of 56 yards. He stood 6 feet 2 inches tall and weighed approximately 190 pounds during his playing career.

== Personal Life and Death ==
In December 1991, John was diagnosed with melanoma, a form of skin cancer. He died from complications related to the illness on April 13, 1992, in Pittsburgh, Pennsylvania.

His funeral service was held at the First Presbyterian Church in Irwin, Pennsylvania.

== Legacy ==
Following his death, Penn State established the John Bruno Jr. Memorial Award, which is presented annually to a member of the Nittany Lions special teams unit in recognition of outstanding performance and dedication. The award honors Bruno’s contributions to the program and his role on Penn State’s 1986 national championship team.
