= Chris Conlin =

American football player (born 1965)

No. 67, 66, 55
- Position: Offensive lineman

Personal information
- Born: June 7, 1965 (age 61); Philadelphia, Pennsylvania, U.S.
- Listed height: 6 ft 4 in (1.93 m)
- Listed weight: 290 lb (132 kg)

Career information
- High school: Wyncote (PA) McDevitt
- College: Penn State
- NFL draft: 1987: 5th round, 132nd overall pick

Career history
- Miami Dolphins (1987–1989); Indianapolis Colts (1990–1991); Philadelphia Eagles (1992)*; Miami Hooters (1993); Massachusetts Marauders (1994); Tampa Bay Storm (1995)
- * Offseason or practice squad member only

Awards and highlights
- ArenaBowl champion (1995); National champion (1986); First-team All-American (1986); First-team All-East (1986)

Career NFL statistics
- Games played: 27
- Games started: 2
- Stats at Pro Football Reference
- Stats at ArenaFan.com

Christopher Howard Conlin (born June 7, 1965) is an American former professional football player and an All-American offensive tackle at Penn State University.

== College career ==
Conlin was a three-year starter at Penn State and earned All-America honors in 1986 as a member of the national championship team that defeated Miami, 14–10, in the Fiesta Bowl. He was one of eight finalists for the Outland Trophy that season.

== Professional career ==
Pre-draft measurables
Height	Weight	Arm length	Hand span	40-yard dash	10-yard split	20-yard split	20-yard shuttle	Vertical jump	Broad jump	Bench press
6 ft 3 3/8 in (1.91 m)	285 lb (129 kg)	32 1/4 in (0.82 m)	9 3/4 in (0.25 m)	5.33 s	1.78 s	3.11 s	4.59 s	23.0 in (0.58 m)	7 ft 8 in (2.34 m)	21 reps
All values from NFL Combine

Chosen by the Miami Dolphins in the fifth round of the 1987 NFL draft, Conlin played 5 injury-plagued seasons in the National Football League, three with the Dolphins (1987–1989) and two with the Indianapolis Colts (1990–1992) before arriving in the Arena Football League, first with the 1993 Miami Hooters and the 1994 Massachusetts Marauders. He would win an ArenaBowl championship with the Tampa Bay Storm in 1995.

== Coaching career ==
Conlin was the line coach for the Arizona Rattlers of the Arena Football League, where he produced a #1-ranked rushing defense and #2-ranked scoring defense in 2000. He also served on the coaching staff of the Florida Bobcats in 1996 and 1999 and the New Jersey Red Dogs in 1997.

== Personal life ==
Conlin lives in Cooper City, Florida. He is an alumnus of Bishop McDevitt High School in Wyncote, Pennsylvania. Married to Loretta (Ditter) Conlin. They have one daughter (Laurin) together. Their daughter Laurin is a professional bodybuilder.
