= 1986 All-America college football team =

Official list of the best college football players of 1986

The 1986 All-America college football team is composed of college football players who were selected as All-Americans by various organizations and writers that chose College Football All-America Teams in 1986. The National Collegiate Athletic Association (NCAA) recognizes five selectors as "official" for the 1986 season. They are: (1) the American Football Coaches Association (AFCA); (2) the Associated Press (AP) selected based on the votes of sports writers at AP newspapers; (3) the Football Writers Association of America (FWAA); (4) the United Press International (UPI) selected based on the votes of sports writers at UPI newspapers; and (5) the Walter Camp Football Foundation (WC). Other notable selectors included Football News (FN), Gannett News Service (GNS), the Newspaper Enterprise Association (NEA), Scripps Howard (SH), and The Sporting News (TSN).

== Consensus All-Americans ==
The following charts identify the NCAA-recognized consensus All-Americans for the year 1986 and displays which first-team designations they received.

=== Offense ===
Name	Position	School	Number	Official	Other
Vinny Testaverde	Quarterback	Miami (Fla)	5/5/10	AFCA, AP, FWAA, UPI, WC	FN, GNS, NEA, SH, TSN
Brent Fullwood	Running back	Auburn	5/5/10	AFCA, AP, FWAA, UPI, WC	FN, GNS, NEA, SH, TSN
Paul Palmer	Running back	Temple	5/5/10	AFCA, AP, FWAA, UPI, WC	FN, GNS, NEA, SH, TSN
Ben Tamburello	Center	Auburn	5/4/9	AFCA, AP, FWAA, UPI, WC	FN, NEA, SH, TSN
Jeff Bregel	Offensive guard	USC	4/5/9	AFCA, AP, UPI, WC	FN, GNS, NEA, SH, TSN
Cris Carter	Wide receiver	Ohio State	4/4/8	AFCA, AP, UPI, WC	FN, GNS, NEA, SH
Keith Jackson	Tight end	Oklahoma	5/2/7	AFCA, AP, FWAA, UPI, WC	SH, TSN
Randy Dixon	Offensive tackle	Pittsburgh	3/2/5	AFCA, UPI, WC	FN, TSN
John Clay	Offensive tackle	Missouri	2/3/5	UPI, WC	GNS, NEA, SH
Danny Villa	Offensive tackle	Arizona State	2/0/2	AF, FWAA	--
D. J. Dozier	Running back	Penn State	1/0/1	WC	--
Terrence Flagler	Running back	Clemson	1/0/1	FWAA	--
Brad Muster	Running back	Stanford	1/0/1	AFCA	--

=== Defense ===
Name	Position	School	Number	Official	Other
Cornelius Bennett	Linebacker	Alabama	5/5/10	AFCA, AP, FWAA, UPI, WC	FN, GNS, NEA, SH, TSN
Brian Bosworth	Linebacker	Oklahoma	5/5/10	AFCA, AP, FWAA, UPI, WC	FN, GNS, NEA, SH, TSN
Thomas Everett	Defensive back	Baylor	5/5/10	AFCA, AP, FWAA, UPI, WC	FN, GNS, NEA, SH, TSN
Jerome Brown	Defensive tackle	Miami (Fla)	5/4/9	AFCA, AP, FWAA, UPI, WC	FN, NEA, SH, TSN
Shane Conlan	Linebacker	Penn State	5/4/9	AFCA, AP, FWAA, UPI, WC	FN, GNS, NEA, SH
Danny Noonan	Defensive tackle	Nebraska	5/4/9	AFCA, AP, FWAA, UPI, WC	FN, GNS, NEA, SH
Chris Spielman	Linebacker	Ohio State	3/5/8	AFCA, AP, FWAA	FN, GNS, NEA, SH, TSN
Tim McDonald	Defensive back	USC	4/2/6	AFCA, FWAA, UPI, WC	FN, SH
Jason Buck	Defensive end	BYU	2/4/6	AFCA, FWAA	GNS, NEA, SH, TSN
Rod Woodson	Defensive back	Purdue	2/4/6	AP, UPI	GNS, NEA, SH, TSN
Reggie Rogers	Defensive end	Washington	2/3/5	UPI, WC	FN, NEA, SH
Bennie Blades	Defensive back	Miami (Fla)	2/2/4	AP, UPI, WC	SH, TSN
Garland Rivers	Defensive back	Michigan	2/1/3	AFCA, WC	NEA
Tony Woods	Defensive end	Pittsburgh	2/1/3	FWAA, UPI	TSN

=== Special teams ===
Name	Position	School	Number	Official	Other
Jeff Jaeger	Placekicker	Washington	3/1/4	AP, UPI, WC	FN
Barry Helton	Punter	Colorado	2/2/4	AP, UPI	GNS, TSN

== Full selections - offense ==
=== Quarterbacks ===
- Vinny Testaverde, Miami (FL) (CFHOF) (AFCA, AP-1, FWAA, UPI-1, WC, FN-1, GNS-1, NEA-1, SH, TSN)
- Jim Harbaugh, Michigan (AP-2, UPI-2, FN-1, NEA-2)
- Kevin Murray, Texas A&M (AP-3, FN-2)
- Kevin Sweeney, Fresno State (GNS-2, NEA-2)
- Jamelle Holieway, Oklahoma (FN-3)
- Chris Miller, Oregon (GNS-3)

=== Running backs ===
- Brent Fullwood, Auburn (AFCA, AP-1, FWAA, UPI-1, WC, FN-1, GNS-1, NEA-1, SH, TSN)
- Paul Palmer, Temple (CFHOF) (AFCA, AP-1, FWAA, UPI-1, WC, FN-1, GNS-1, NEA-1, SH, TSN)
- Terrence Flagler, Clemson (AP-3, FWAA, FN-3, GNS-2)
- Brad Muster, Stanford (AFCA, UPI-2, FN-2)
- D. J. Dozier, Penn State (UPI-2, WC, FN-2, GNS-3, NEA-2)
- Steve Bartalo, Colorado St. (AP-2, NEA-2)
- Bobby Humphrey, Alabama (AP-2, FN-2)
- Reggie Taylor, Cincinnati (GNS-2)
- Gaston Green, UCLA (AP-3, FN-3)
- Thurman Thomas, Oklahoma State (CFHOF) (FN-3)
- Troy Stradford, Boston College (GNS-3)

=== Wide receivers ===
- Cris Carter, Ohio State (AFCA, AP-1, UPI-1, WC, FN-1, GNS-1, NEA-1, SH)
- Tim Brown, Notre Dame (CFHOF) (AP-1, UPI-1, FN-1, GNS-1, NEA-2, SH, TSN)
- Wendell Davis, LSU (AP-2, FWAA, UPI-2, FN-2, GNS-3, NEA-2, TSN)
- Michael Irvin, Miami (FL) (AP-2, UPI-2, GNS-3, NEA-1)
- Sterling Sharpe, South Carolina (CFHOF) (AP-3, FN-2)
- Ron Morris, SMU (GNS-2)
- Haywood Jeffires, North Carolina State (GNS-2)
- Marc Zeno, Tulane (AP-3)
- J. R. Ambrose, Ole Miss (FN-3)
- Naz Worthen, North Carolina State (FN-3)

=== Tight ends ===
- Keith Jackson, Oklahoma (CFHOF) (AFCA, AP-1, FWAA, UPI-1, WC, GNS-2, NEA-2, SH, TSN)
- Rod Bernstine, Texas A&M (AP-2, UPI-2, GNS-1, NEA-1)
- Rob Awalt, San Diego St. (AP-3)
- Jim Riggs, Clemson (GNS-3)

=== Centers ===
- Ben Tamburello, Auburn (AFCA, AP-1, FWAA, UPI-1, WC, FN-1, GNS-2, NEA-1, SH, TSN)
- Gregg Rakoczy, Miami (FL) (AP-2, GNS-1, NEA-2)
- John Davis, Georgia Tech (UPI-2, SH)
- Joe Tofflemire, Arizona (FN-2)
- Eric Coyle, Colorado (AP-3, GNS-3)
- Bob Maggs, Ohio State (FN-3)

=== Offensive guards ===
- Jeff Bregel, USC (AFCA, AP-1, UPI-1, WC, FN-1, GNS-1, NEA-1, SH, TSN)
- Jeff Zimmerman, Florida (WC, FN-2 [OT], SH)
- Paul Kiser, Wake Forest (FWAA, GNS-2, NEA-2, TSN)
- Chris Conlin, Penn State (AP-2 [OT], FWAA)
- Mark Hutson, Oklahoma (AP-1, UPI-2)
- Randall McDaniel, Arizona State (CFHOF) (AFCA)
- John Phillips, Clemson (UPI-1, FN-2)
- Steve Trapilo, Boston College (AP-2, UPI-2, GNS-1, NEA-1)
- Anthony Phillips, Oklahoma (FN-1, GNS-3, NEA-2)
- Fred Childress, Arkansas (AP-2)
- Harry Galbreath, Tennessee (FN-2)
- Bruce Blackmar, Texas (GNS-2)
- Doug Aronson, San Diego St. (AP-3)
- Todd Peat, Northern Illinois (AP-3)
- Eric Andolsek, LSU (FN-3)
- Mark Stepnoski, Pittsburgh (FN-3)

=== Offensive tackles ===
- John Clay, Missouri (AP-2, UPI-1, WC, FN-2, GNS-1, NEA-1, SH)
- Randy Dixon, Pittsburgh (AFCA, AP-3, UPI-1, WC, FN-1, GNS-2, NEA-2, TSN)
- Danny Villa, Arizona State (AP-1, FWAA, GNS-3, NEA-2)
- Harris Barton, North Carolina (CFHOF) (AP-1, FN-3, GNS-1, NEA-1)
- Jumbo Elliot, Michigan (CFHOF) (AFCA, AP-3, UPI-2)
- Dave Croston, Iowa (FWAA, UPI-2, GNS-2, TSN)
- Wilbur Strozier, Georgia (FN-1, GNS-3)
- Tom Welter, Nebraska (FN-3)
- Bruce Wilkerson, Tennessee (GNS-3)

== Full selections - defense ==
=== Defensive ends ===
- Jason Buck, BYU (AFCA, FWAA, UPI-2, FN-2, GNS-1 [DT], NEA-1, SH, TSN)
- Reggie Rogers, Washington (AP-2, UPI-1, WC, FN-1, GNS-2, NEA-1, SH)
- Tony Woods, Pittsburgh (AP-2, FWAA, UPI-1, FN-2, GNS-2, NEA-2, TSN)
- Daniel Stubbs, Miami (FL) (AP-2, UPI-2, GNS-2)
- Scott Stephen, Arizona State (FN-2, GNS-2 [LB])
- Darrell Reed, Oklahoma (AP-3)

=== Defensive tackles ===
- Jerome Brown, Miami (FL) (AFCA, AP-1, FWAA, UPI-1, WC, FN-1, GNS-3, NEA-1, SH, TSN)
- Danny Noonan, Nebraska (AFCA, AP-1, FWAA, UPI-1, WC, FN-1, GNS-1 [NT], NEA-1, SH)
- Tim Johnson, Penn State (AP-2, WC)
- Al Noga, Hawaii (AP-1)
- Jerry Ball, SMU (UPI-2, FN-2, GNS-1, NEA-2)
- Shawn Knight, BYU (AP-3, GNS-1)
- Tony Cherico, Arkansas (AP-2 [NG], FN-3)
- Wally Kleine, Notre Dame (FN-2)
- Curt Jarvis, Alabama (GNS-2)
- John Bosa, Boston College (AP-3, UPI-2)
- Henry Thomas, LSU (AP-3 [NG], FN-3, NEA-2)
- Mark Messner, Michigan (CFHOF) (FN-3)
- Dick Chapura, Missouri (GNS-3)
- Tracy Rocker, Auburn (CFHOF) (GNS-3, NEA-2)
- Gerald Nichols, Florida State (GNS-3)

=== Linebackers ===
- Cornelius Bennett, Alabama (CFHOF) (AFCA, AP-1, FWAA, UPI-1, WC, FN-1, GNS-1, NEA-1, SH, TSN)
- Brian Bosworth, Oklahoma (CFHOF) (AFCA, AP-1, FWAA, UPI-1, WC, FN-1, GNS-1, NEA-1, SH, TSN)
- Shane Conlan, Penn State (CFHOF) (AFCA, AP-1, FWAA, UPI-1, WC, FN-1, GNS-1, NEA-1, SH)
- Chris Spielman, Ohio State (CFHOF) (AFCA, AP-1, FWAA, UPI-2, FN-1, GNS-1, NEA-1, SH, TSN)
- Terry Maki, Air Force (AFCA, AP-3, UPI-2, FN-2, NEA-2)
- Dave Wyman, Stanford (GNS-2, NEA-2, TSN)
- Johnny Holland, Texas A&M (AP-3, UPI-2, FN-1, GNS-3, NEA-2)
- Marcus Cotton, USC (AP-2, FN-3, GNS-2)
- Byron Evans, Arizona (AP-2, FN-2)
- Mike Junkin, Duke (AP-2, GNS-2, NEA-2)
- Ken Norton Jr., UCLA (FN-2)
- Van Waiters, Indiana (AP-3)
- Cedric Figaro, Notre Dame (FN-3)
- Shane Bullough, Michigan State (FN-3)
- Brad Hastings, Texas Tech (FN-3)
- Tyronne Stowe, Rutgers (FN-3)
- Bill Romanowski, Boston College (GNS-3)
- David Brandon, Memphis State (GNS-3)
- Paul McGowan, Florida State (GNS-3)

=== Defensive backs ===
- Thomas Everett, Baylor (CFHOF) (AFCA, AP-1, FWAA, UPI-1, WC, FN-1, GNS-1, NEA-1, SH, TSN)
- Tim McDonald, USC (AFCA, AP-2, FWAA, UPI-1, WC, FN-1, SH)
- Rod Woodson, Purdue (CFHOF) (AP-1, UPI-1, FN-2, GNS-1, NEA-1, SH, TSN [RS])
- Bennie Blades, Miami (FL) (CFHOF) (AP-1, UPI-1, GNS-2, SH, TSN)
- Garland Rivers, Michigan (AFCA, WC, FN-3, NEA-1)
- Gordon Lockbaum, Holy Cross (FWAA)
- John Little, Georgia (AP-2, WC, FN-1, NEA-2)
- Mark Moore, Oklahoma State (AP-1, UPI-2, FN-2, NEA-2)
- Deion Sanders, Florida State (CFHOF) (AP-3, GNS-2, NEA-1, TSN)
- Tim Peoples, Washington (TSN)
- Jarvis Williams, Florida (GNS-1)
- Ray Isom, Penn State (AP-2)
- David Vickers, Oklahoma (AP-2)
- Tom Rotello, Air Force (AP-3, UPI-2, FN-2)
- Ron Francis, Baylor (AP-3, UPI-2)
- Adrian White, Florida (UPI-2)
- Roland Mitchell, Texas Tech (GNS-2)
- Lou Brock Jr., USC (GNS-3, NEA-2)
- Toi Cook, Stanford (NEA-2)
- Harold McGuire, Toledo (AP-3)
- Freddie Robinson, Alabama (FN-3)
- Chuck Cecil, Arizona (CFHOF) (FN-3)
- Sonny Gordon, Ohio State (GNS-3)
- Stephen Braggs, Texas (GNS-3)

== Full selections - special teams ==
=== Kickers ===
- Jeff Jaeger, Washington (AP-1, UPI-1, WC, FN-1, GNS-2, NEA-2)
- Jeff Ward, Texas (AFCA, NEA-1)
- Marty Zendejas, Nevada-Reno (FWAA)
- Van Tiffin, Alabama (GNS-3, SH)
- Chris Kinzer, Virginia Tech (AP-2, UPI-2, FN-2, TSN)
- John Diettrich, Ball State (AP-3, FN-3, GNS-1)

=== Punters ===
- Barry Helton, Colorado (AP-1, UPI-1, FN-3, GNS-1, TSN)
- Greg Montgomery, Michigan State (FWAA, FN-2, SH)
- Bill Smith, Mississippi (AP-2, WC)
- Greg Horne, Arkansas (AFCA, AP-3, UPI-2, FN-1, GNS-3)
- Mark Simon, Air Force (GNS-2)

=== Returners ===
- Rod Woodson, Purdue (CFHOF) (TSN)

== Key ==
- **Bold** – Consensus All-American
- -1 – First-team selection
- -2 – Second-team selection
- -3 – Third-team selection
- CFHOF = College Football Hall of Fame inductee

=== Official selectors ===
- AFCA – American Football Coaches Association (AFCA), selected by the members of the AFCA for the Kodak All-America team
- AP – Associated Press
- FWAA – Football Writers Association of America
- UPI – United Press International
- WC – Walter Camp Football Foundation, selected by the nation's college coaches and sports information directors

=== Other selectors ===
- FN – Football News
- GNS – Gannett News Service
- NEA – Newspaper Enterprise Association, the NEA/World Almanac team
- TSN – The Sporting News
- SH – Scripps Howard

== See also ==
- 1986 All-Atlantic Coast Conference football team
- 1986 All-Big Eight Conference football team
- 1986 All-Big Ten Conference football team
- 1986 All-Pacific-10 Conference football team
- 1986 All-SEC football team
