= Don Graham (American football) =

American football player (born 1964)

No. 53, 59, 57
- Position: Linebacker

Personal information
- Born: January 31, 1964 (age 62); Pittsburgh, Pennsylvania, U.S.
- Listed height: 6 ft 2 in (1.88 m)
- Listed weight: 244 lb (111 kg)

Career information
- High school: Brentwood (PA)
- College: Penn State
- NFL draft: 1987: 4th round, 84th overall pick

Career history
- Tampa Bay Buccaneers (1987); Buffalo Bills (1988); New York Jets (1989)*; Washington Redskins (1989)
- * Offseason or practice squad member only

Awards and highlights
- 2× National champion (1982, 1986); 2× Second-team All-East (1985, 1986)
- Stats at Pro Football Reference

Donald John Graham (born January 31, 1964) is an American former professional football linebacker in the National Football League (NFL) for the Tampa Bay Buccaneers, the Buffalo Bills, and the Washington Redskins. He played college football at Penn State University and was drafted in the fourth round of the 1987 NFL draft.

Pre-draft measurables
Height	Weight	Arm length	Hand span	40-yard dash	10-yard split	20-yard split	20-yard shuttle	Vertical jump	Broad jump	Bench press
6 ft 1 1/2 in (1.87 m)	240 lb (109 kg)	31 in (0.79 m)	9 1/2 in (0.24 m)	4.85 s	1.62 s	2.74 s	4.21 s	29.0 in (0.74 m)	8 ft 9 in (2.67 m)	18 reps
All values from NFL Combine
