= Massimo Manca =

Italian gridiron football player (born 1964)

No. 9, 10
- Position: Placekicker

Personal information
- Born: March 18, 1964 (age 62); Sassari, Italy
- Listed height: 5 ft 10 in (1.78 m)
- Listed weight: 211 lb (96 kg)

Career information
- High school: Reno (Reno, Nevada, U.S.)
- College: Penn State
- NFL draft: 1987: undrafted

Career history
- Cincinnati Bengals (1987); San Francisco 49ers (1988)*; Dallas Cowboys (1989)*; Barcelona Dragons (1991)
- * Offseason or practice squad member only

Awards and highlights
- 2× National champion (1982, 1986); 2× First-team All-East (1985, 1986)

Career NFL statistics
- Field goals made: 1
- Field goal attempts: 2
- Field goal %: 50
- Longest field goal: 28
- Stats at Pro Football Reference

Massimo Manca (born March 18, 1964) is an Italian-born former professional football kicker in the National Football League (NFL) for the Cincinnati Bengals. He also was a member of the Barcelona Dragons in the World League of American Football (WLAF). He played college football at Penn State University.

== Early life and education ==
Manca was born in the Mediterranean island of Sardinia. His family moved to the United States when he was a ten year old in 1974, after his father who was a professor of English at the University of Sardinia, took a job at the University of Nevada, Reno to teach Italian as part of an exchange program.

He returned to Italy after two years, where he attended the eighth and ninth grades. He returned to the United States and enrolled at Reno High School as a sophomore. He began playing American football as a junior. He made field goals of 52, 47, and 46 yards as a senior.

== College career ==
Manca accepted a football scholarship from Penn State University, to play under head coach Joe Paterno, who also had an Italian heritage. As a true freshman in 1982, he replaced the injured starter Nick Gancitano in the season opener against the Temple University, making a 37-yard field goal attempt and all 4 of his extra point tries. In the second game against the University of Maryland, he made all four of his field goals in a 39-31 victory. In the fourth game against No. 2 Nebraska, he had a nightmare of a performance, missing three field goals and one extra point. Gancitano, regained his starting job, contributing to the 1982 National Championship season and eventually setting a career school record with 77.6 percent field-goal accuracy (38-of-49 field goals). Manca finished the season with 11 game appearances, 5-of-9 field goals made (55.6%) and 19-of-20 extra points made (95.0%).

In 1983, he was redshirted. As a sophomore in 1984, he was only used to handle the kickoffs. He made 2-of-2 extra points (100%) and missed his only field goal attempt.

As a junior in 1985, he was named the starter at kicker. He registered 21-of-26 field goals (80.8%) and 28-of-28 extra points (100%). Although the team's overall record was 11-1, seven of those contests were decided by seven points or less and Manca’s points were critical. He was 2-for-2 in a 20-18 victory against the University of Maryland, 2-for-3 in a 27-25 win over Temple University and 4-for-5 in a 19-17 win against the University of Alabama. He tied a school single-game record with 5 field goals in the tenth contest against the University of Notre Dame.

As a senior in 1986, he contributed to the 1986 National Championship, although his production was down, compiling 14-of-23 field goal attempts (60.9%) and 37-of-37 extra point attempts (100%). His 206 career points, ranked second all-time in school history and also set the school record of career points for a kicker.

== Professional career ==
Manca was signed as an undrafted free agent by the Cincinnati Bengals after the 1987 NFL draft on May 4. He was waived on August 31.

After the NFLPA strike was declared on the third week of the 1987 season, those contests were canceled (reducing the 16 game season to 15) and the NFL decided that the games would be played with replacement players. In September, he was re-signed to be a part of the Bengals replacement team. He appeared in 3 games, making 1-of-2 field goals (50.0%) and 3-of-3 extra point attempts. He was released after the strike ended in October.

On February 11, 1988, he was signed by the San Francisco 49ers as a free agent. He was cut on August 28.

In February 1989, Manca signed with the Dallas Cowboys, after a try-out at a free agent kicking combine in Reno, Nevada. He would become a part of Cowboys lore during a March mini-camp, when he was required to run a series of sixteen 110-yard sprints with the rest of the team, but needed to rest after the eighth run. Then new head coach Jimmy Johnson confronted Manca, who mentioned he suffered from asthma, although the accounts vary of the exchanged that followed, it was later reported in the media that an angry Johnson replied "Asthma, my ass. The asthma field is over there", while pointing to the parking lot at the Cowboys Valley Ranch complex. He was released on August 12.

In February 1991, Manca was selected by the Barcelona Dragons in the inaugural WLAF Draft. He made 14-of-22 field goals (63.6%) and 18-of-21 extra points (85.7%). He was released on February 28, 1992.

== Personal life ==
His brother Maurizio was a kicker at the University of Virginia.
