= D. J. Dozier =

American football and baseball player (born 1965)

No. 42
- Position: Running back

Personal information
- Born: September 21, 1965 (age 61); Norfolk, Virginia, U.S.
- Listed height: 6 ft 0 in (1.83 m)
- Listed weight: 210 lb (95 kg)

Career information
- High school: Kempsville (Virginia Beach, Virginia)
- College: Penn State
- NFL draft: 1987: 1st round, 14th overall pick

Career history
- Minnesota Vikings (1987–1990); Detroit Lions (1991)

Awards and highlights
- National champion (1986); Consensus All-American (1986); First-team All-East (1986); 2× Second-team All-East (1983, 1984)

Career NFL statistics
- Rushing yards: 691
- Rushing average: 4
- Touchdowns: 9 Baseball career
- Outfielder
- Batted: Right Threw: Right
MLB debut
- May 6, 1992, for the New York Mets
Last MLB appearance
- October 4, 1992, for the New York Mets
MLB statistics
- Batting average: .191
- Home runs: 0
- Runs batted in: 2
- Stats at Baseball Reference
Teams
- New York Mets (1992)
- Stats at Pro Football Reference

William Henry "D.J." Dozier Jr. (born September 21, 1965) is an American former professional National Football League (NFL) running back and Major League Baseball (MLB) outfielder. He played five seasons with the NFL's Minnesota Vikings and Detroit Lions from 1987 to 1991, and played one season with the MLB's New York Mets in 1992. He currently resides in Virginia Beach, Virginia.

== Early life ==
Dozier was born in Norfolk, Virginia. He attended Kempsville High School in Virginia Beach, Virginia, and later attended Penn State University. When D.J. was 12 years old, he played on a youth basketball team for Kempsville and made it to the Virginia Beach city championship game. His team played against the Green Run Suns, who had future NBA Hall of Fame player David Robinson on the team. Kempsville won the game, mainly in part to David Robinson (who was a small forward and not the tallest player on the team nor highest scorer) missing the game due to having come down with the mumps. Dozier, who would eventually grow to 6 feet tall, was already 5'9" or 5'10" by 12 years old. With his athleticism, skill and size, he dominated the undefeated Suns and won the city championship.

== Football career ==
Pre-draft measurables
Height	Weight	Arm length	Hand span	Vertical jump
6 ft 0 1/4 in (1.84 m)	204 lb (93 kg)	31 1/4 in (0.79 m)	10 1/4 in (0.26 m)	34.0 in (0.86 m)
All values from NFL Combine

- Dozier scored the winning touchdown of Penn State's 1987 National Championship Fiesta Bowl victory over Miami.
- Dozier was drafted out of Penn State in the first round (#14 overall) of the 1987 NFL draft.
- He shared the November 11, 1985 cover of Sports Illustrated with Florida's Ray McDonald.
- He had a career average of 4.0 yards per carry. In 1991—his final season—he averaged 5.3 yards per rush on 9 attempts.
- He fumbled the ball only 4 times during his 5-year professional career.
- Dozier had a perfect 158.3 passer rating as a pro. (He was 1-for-1 for 19 yards and a touchdown)
- Dozier caught 33 career passes, averaging 9.1 yards per catch.
- As a kick returner, he averaged 19.4 yards per return.

== Baseball career ==
Dozier, who was 6'0", 202 pounds and who threw and batted right-handed was originally drafted by the Detroit Tigers in the 18th round in 1983 (459th overall). He opted not to sign and decided to go to college, where he would pursue his football career.

In 1990, the New York Mets signed him as an amateur free agent. He spent 1990 and 1991 in the minor leagues, where he showed good speed (he stole 33 bases with St. Lucie in 1990) and also some power (in 1990, he hit 13 home runs with St. Lucie). He played for the Williamsport Bills in 1991.

After spending some time in the minors in 1992, he was called up to the Major Leagues and made his debut on May 6, 1992, at the age of 26. In 25 games, he hit .191 with 4 stolen bases and 19 strikeouts in 47 at-bats. Defensively, he committed 1 error for a fielding percentage of .971.

On October 26, 1992, Dozier was traded with catcher Raul Casanova and pitcher Wally Whitehurst for shortstop/third baseman Tony Fernández.
