= 2005 Penn State Nittany Lions football team =

American college football season

2005 Penn State Nittany Lions football

Big Ten co-champion Orange Bowl champion Lambert-Meadowlands Trophy

Orange Bowl, W 26–23 ^{3OT} vs. Florida State
- Conference: Big Ten Conference

Ranking
- Coaches: No. 3
- AP: No. 3
- Record: 11–1 (7–1 Big Ten)
- Head coach: Joe Paterno (40th season)
- Offensive coordinator: Galen Hall (2nd season)
- Offensive scheme: Pro-style
- Defensive coordinator: Tom Bradley (6th season)
- Base defense: 4–3
- Home stadium: Beaver Stadium

2005 Big Ten Conference football standings
	Conf.			Overall
Team	W		L	W		L
No. 3 Penn State $+	7	–	1	11	–	1
No. 4 Ohio State %+	7	–	1	10	–	2
No. 15 Wisconsin	5	–	3	10	–	3
Michigan	5	–	3	7	–	5
Northwestern	5	–	3	7	–	5
Iowa	5	–	3	7	–	5
Minnesota	4	–	4	7	–	5
Purdue	3	–	5	5	–	6
Michigan State	2	–	6	5	–	6
Indiana	1	–	7	4	–	7
Illinois	0	–	8	2	–	9
$ – BCS representative as conference champion; % – BCS at-large representative; + – Conference co-champions; Rankings from AP Poll

The 2005 Penn State Nittany Lions football team represented the Pennsylvania State University in the 2005 NCAA Division I-A football season. The team's head coach was Joe Paterno. It played its home games at Beaver Stadium in University Park, Pennsylvania.

== Preseason ==
The team returned 18 starters from last year's squad. Eight starters returned on offense, led by starting quarterback Michael Robinson who has also played at wide receiver, tailback, and punt returner during his first three years at Penn State. Robinson played exclusively under center after the graduation of Zack Mills.

Nine defensive starters return from a unit did not allow more than 21 points in a game in 2004. Also returning was safety Chris Harrell who suffered a neck injury in 2003 and missed the 2004 season.

Michael Robinson, Alan Zemaitis, and Paul Posluszny were elected tri-captains of the football team in 2005. Posluszny was the first junior captain since 1968.

Penn State started the season unranked in both the AP and the Coaches college football preseason polls.

=== Recruiting class ===
College recruiting information
Name	Hometown	School	Height	Weight	40^{‡}	Commit date
Chris Baker; DT	Windsor, Connecticut	Windsor HS	6 ft 3 in (1.91 m)	295 lb (134 kg)	5.00	Jan 25, 2005
Chris Baker; DT	Recruit ratings: Scout: Rivals:					
Daryll Clark; QB	Saltsburg, Pennsylvania	The Kiskiminetas Springs School	6 ft 4 in (1.93 m)	220 lb (100 kg)	4.60	Dec 15, 2004
Daryll Clark; QB	Recruit ratings: Scout: Rivals:					
Francis Claude; TE	Beauport, Quebec	Champlain Prep	6 ft 5 in (1.96 m)	252 lb (114 kg)	4.60	Nov 15, 2004
Francis Claude; TE	Recruit ratings: Scout: Rivals:					
Brennan Coakley; TE	Sandy Hook, Connecticut	Newtown HS	6 ft 5 in (1.96 m)	240 lb (110 kg)	4.62	Oct 26, 2004
Brennan Coakley; TE	Recruit ratings: Scout: Rivals:					
Kevin Cousins; WR	Richmond, Virginia	Huguenot HS	6 ft 4 in (1.93 m)	190 lb (86 kg)	4.40	May 16, 2004
Kevin Cousins; WR	Recruit ratings: Scout: Rivals:					
Devin Fentress; CB	Chesapeake, Virginia	Western Branch HS	5 ft 11 in (1.80 m)	170 lb (77 kg)	4.40	Sep 8, 2004
Devin Fentress; CB	Recruit ratings: Scout: Rivals:					
Willie Harriott; CB	Hamden, Connecticut	Hyde Leadership School	5 ft 8 in (1.73 m)	175 lb (79 kg)	4.40	Dec 15, 2004
Willie Harriott; CB	Recruit ratings: Scout: Rivals:					
Jerome Hayes; LB	Bayonne, New Jersey	Bayonne HS	6 ft 2 in (1.88 m)	225 lb (102 kg)	4.60	Feb 2, 2005
Jerome Hayes; LB	Recruit ratings: Scout: Rivals:					
Kevin Kelly; K	Langhorne, Pennsylvania	Neshaminy HS	5 ft 8 in (1.73 m)	175 lb (79 kg)	4.60	Oct 12, 2004
Kevin Kelly; K	Recruit ratings: Scout: Rivals:					
Justin King; CB	Monroeville, Pennsylvania	Gateway SHS	6 ft 0 in (1.83 m)	180 lb (82 kg)	4.40	Nov 15, 2004
Justin King; CB	Recruit ratings: Scout: Rivals:					
Dennis Landolt; OL	Delran, New Jersey	Holy Cross HS	6 ft 5 in (1.96 m)	275 lb (125 kg)	5.00	Nov 24, 2004
Dennis Landolt; OL	Recruit ratings: Scout: Rivals:					
Sean Lee; LB	Pittsburgh, Pennsylvania	Upper Saint Clair HS	6 ft 3 in (1.91 m)	215 lb (98 kg)	4.60	Dec 16, 2004
Sean Lee; LB	Recruit ratings: Scout: Rivals:					
Matt Lowry; OL	Springfield, Pennsylvania	Cardinal O'Hara HS	6 ft 6 in (1.98 m)	305 lb (138 kg)	5.40	Jan 20, 2005
Matt Lowry; OL	Recruit ratings: Scout: Rivals:					
James McDonald; WR	Washington, D.C.	Dunbar HS	6 ft 2 in (1.88 m)	185 lb (84 kg)	4.55	Dec 14, 2004
James McDonald; WR	Recruit ratings: Scout: Rivals:					
Anthony Scirrotto; S	Westville, New Jersey	West Deptford HS	6 ft 1 in (1.85 m)	185 lb (84 kg)	4.40	Dec 17, 2004
Anthony Scirrotto; S	Recruit ratings: Scout: Rivals:					
Lydell Sargeant; RB	Lompoc, California	Cabrillo Senior HS	5 ft 10 in (1.78 m)	185 lb (84 kg)	4.50	Nov 16, 2004
Lydell Sargeant; RB	Recruit ratings: Scout: Rivals:					
Mickey Shuler; TE	Enola, Pennsylvania	East Pennsboro Area SHS	6 ft 4 in (1.93 m)	215 lb (98 kg)	NA	Feb 1, 2005
Mickey Shuler; TE	Recruit ratings: Scout: Rivals:					
Knowledge Timmons; CB	York, Pennsylvania	William Penn SHS	5 ft 10 in (1.78 m)	175 lb (79 kg)	4.30	Dec 23, 2004
Knowledge Timmons; CB	Recruit ratings: Scout: Rivals:					
Derrick Williams; WR	Greenbelt, Maryland	Eleanor Roosevelt HS	6 ft 0 in (1.83 m)	193 lb (88 kg)	4.40	Dec 22, 2004
Derrick Williams; WR	Recruit ratings: Scout: Rivals:					
Overall recruit ranking: Scout: 28 Rivals: 25
‡ Refers to 40-yard dash; Note: In many cases, Scout, Rivals, 247Sports, On3, and ESPN may conflict in their listings of height, weight and 40 time.; In these cases, the average was taken. ESPN grades are on a 100-point scale.; Sources: "Penn State Commit List for 2005". Rivals.; "Scout.com Football Recruiting: Penn State". Scout.; "Scout.com Team Recruiting Rankings". Scout.; "2005 Team Ranking". Rivals.com.

=== Pre-season awards ===
- Alan Zemaitis
  Second-team Sporting News All-American
  Third-team Street & Smith's All-American
  First-team Sporting News All-Big Ten

== Schedule ==
Date	Time	Opponent	Rank	Site	TV	Result	Attendance
September 3	3:30 p.m.	South Florida*		Beaver Stadium; University Park, PA	ESPNU	W 23–13	99,235
September 10	12:00 p.m.	Cincinnati*		Beaver Stadium; University Park, PA	ESPN Plus	W 42–24	98,727
September 17	3:30 p.m.	Central Michigan*		Beaver Stadium; University Park, PA	ESPN Plus	W 40–3	100,276
September 24	12:00 p.m.	at Northwestern		Ryan Field; Evanston, IL	ESPN2	W 34–29	24,395
October 1	3:30 p.m.	No. 18 Minnesota		Beaver Stadium; University Park, PA (Governor's Victory Bell)	ABC	W 44–14	106,604
October 8	7:45 p.m.	No. 6 Ohio State	No. 16	Beaver Stadium; University Park, PA (rivalry, College GameDay)	ESPN	W 17–10	109,839
October 15	3:30 p.m.	at Michigan	No. 8	Michigan Stadium; Ann Arbor, MI (rivalry)	ABC	L 25–27	111,249
October 22	7:00 p.m.	at Illinois	No. 12	Memorial Stadium; Champaign, IL	ESPN2	W 63–10	52,633
October 29	3:30 p.m.	Purdue^{†}	No. 11	Beaver Stadium; University Park, PA	ABC	W 33–15	109,467
November 5	3:30 p.m.	No. 14 Wisconsin	No. 10	Beaver Stadium; University Park, PA	ABC	W 35–14	109,865
November 19	4:00 p.m.	at Michigan State	No. 5	Spartan Stadium; East Lansing, MI (rivalry, College GameDay)	ESPN	W 31–22	75,005
January 3, 2006	8:00 p.m.	vs. No. 22 Florida State*	No. 3	Dolphin Stadium; Miami Gardens, FL (Orange Bowl)	ABC	W 26–23 ^{3OT}	77,773
*Non-conference game; ^{†}Homecoming; Rankings from AP Poll released prior to the game; All times are in Eastern time

== Personnel ==
=== Roster ===
2005 Penn State Nittany Lions football team roster
Players
Coaches
Offense

Pos.	#	Name	Class
WR	2	Derrick Williams	Fr
WR	3	Deon Butler	Fr
WR	4	Terrell Golden	So
WR	5	Jim Kanuch	Jr
QB	6	Mike Hart	So
RB	8	Rodney Kinlaw	So
QB	12	Michael Robinson (C)	Sr
QB	14	Anthony Morelli	So
QB	15	Paul Cianciolo	Fr
WR	16	Dan Corrado	Jr
WR	16	Lydell Sargeant	Fr
QB	17	Daryll Clark	Fr
WR	17	Knowledge Timmons	Fr
QB	18	Kevin Suhey	Fr
TE	22	Jed Hill	Fr
WR	24	Jordan Norwood	Fr
WR	25	Brendan Perretta	So
RB	26	Tony Hunt	Jr
WR	29	Patrick Mauti	Fr
FB	30	BranDon Snow	Jr
RB	33	Austin Scott	Jr
RB	34	Matt Hahn	So
RB	36	Nick Pinchek	So
FB	38	Dan Lawlor	Fr
FB	42	Adam Senk	Sr
WR	43	Ethan Kilmer	Sr
TE	44	Patrick Hall	Jr
RB	48	Zack Zeglinski	Fr
OT	50	Andrew Richardson	Sr
G	56	Austin Hinton	Fr
C	57	A.Q. Shipley	Fr
G	58	Greg Harrison	Fr
G	59	Charles Rush	Sr
C	60	Patick Weber	So
OT	61	Matt Lowry	Fr
G	63	Joe Toriello	Fr
OL	64	Rich Ohrnberger	Fr
G	65	Robert Price	Jr
C	66	Lance Antolick	Sr
OT	67	Levi Brown	Jr
OT	68	John Wilson	Sr
G	70	Wyatt Bowman	Fr
G	71	Mark Farris	Jr
C	72	Trent Varva	Fr
OL	73	Dennis Landolt	Fr
G	74	Tyler Reed	Sr
G	75	Richard Cheek	Jr
OT	76	Gerald Cadogan	Fr
OT	78	John Shaw	Jr
OT	79	Chris Auletta	So
WR	80	Mark Rubin	So
TE	81	Isaac Smolko	Sr
WR	82	Vic Surma	Jr
WR	83	Kevin Cousins	Fr
WR	84	James McDonald	Fr
TE	85	Mickey Shuler	Fr
TE	87	Greg Miskinis	Fr
TE	88	Brennan Coakley	Fr
TE	89	Jordan Lyons	Fr

Defense

Pos.	#	Name	Class
CB	1	Anwar Phillips	Sr
S	4	Anthony Scirrotto	Fr
LB	5	Jerome Hayes	Fr
S	6	Donnie Johnson	Jr
CB	7	Justin King	Fr
S	9	Jason Ganter	So
S	10	Calvin Lowry	Sr
CB	11	Tony Davis	Fr
DT	13	Jay Alford	Jr
CB	15	Brent Wise	So
DE	16	Francis Claude	Fr
LB	19	Andy Kubic	Jr
LB	20	Tim Shaw	Jr
CB	21	Alan Zemaitis (C)	Sr
S	22	Darien Hardy	Jr
S	24	Nolan McCready	Jr
DB	25	Devin Fentress	Fr
S	27	Chris Harrell	Sr
DB	28	Willie Harriott	Fr
S	29	Paul Cronin	Sr
LB	31	Paul Posluszny (C)	Jr
CB	32	Rocky Washington	Fr
CB	35	John Royse	Sr
LB	35	J.R. Zwierzynski	Jr
LB	37	Spencer Ridenhour	Fr
DB	39	Doug Rheam	Fr
LB	40	Dan Connor	So
DT	41	Scott Paxson	Sr
LB	43	Josh Hull	Fr
LB	45	Sean Lee	Fr
S	46	Curt Reese	Sr
LB	46	Tyrell Sales	Fr
DE	47	Josh Gaines	Fr
LB	48	Matt Pavelic	Jr
LB	49	Dorian Burton	Sr
LB	51	Joe Cianciolo	Jr
LB	52	Dontey Brown	Fr
DT	53	Steve Roach	Jr
DE	55	Matthew Rice	Sr
LB	57	Chris Mauriello	So
DE	62	Ross Muir	Fr
DT	75	Lee Kuzemchak	Jr
DT	86	Mike Lucian	Fr
LB	88	Kevin Darling	Jr
DE	91	Tamba Hali	Sr
DL	93	Chris Baker	Fr
DT	94	Blase Iorio	Jr
DT	95	Elijah Robinson	So
DE	98	Mike Pawlikowski	Sr
DE	99	Jim Shaw	Jr

Special teams

Pos.	#	Name	Class
K	13	Patrick Humes	Fr
K	23	Kevin Kelly	Fr
P	36	Jeremy Kapinos	Jr
P	44	Jeremy Boone	Fr
LS	90	Nick Daise	Jr
K	96	Matt Waldron	Fr

Head coach

- Joe Paterno

Coordinators/assistant coaches

Legend

- (C) Team captain
- (S) Suspended
- (I) Ineligible
- Injured
- Redshirt

Roster
Last update: August 12, 2005

=== Coaching staff ===
- Joe Paterno – Head Coach
- Dick Anderson – Offensive Line (Guards and Centers)
- Tom Bradley – Defensive Coordinator and Cornerbacks
- Galen Hall – Offensive Coordinator and Running Backs
- Larry Johnson, Sr. – Defensive Line
- Bill Kenney – Offensive Tackles and Tight Ends
- Mike McQueary – Wide Receivers and Recruiting Coordinator
- Brian Norwood – Safeties
- Jay Paterno – Quarterbacks
- Ron Vanderlinden – Linebackers
- John Thomas – Strength and Conditioning

== Game summaries ==
=== September 3: South Florida ===
	1	2	3	4	Total
South Florida	0	7	0	6	13
Penn State	10	7	0	6	23

Penn State opened the season by defeating the Bulls 23–13. In his debut as a full-time starter at quarterback, Michael Robinson struggled, finishing 9 of 15 for 90 yards and an interception that set up the Bulls' first touchdown. Robinson also ran for 39 yards on 18 carries but was sacked three times and lost two fumbles. Tony Hunt finished with a career-high 140 yards on 15 carries. Alan Zemaitis scored the Lions' first touchdown of the year on a fumble recovery.

The Nittany Lions also tried to show off two highly touted freshmen. Justin King, who played both ways in the game, made his first contribution with a 61-yard run on a reverse. Derrick Williams finished with 38 yards on three catches.

Punter Jeremy Kapinos landed three punts inside the 11 and was named the Big Ten Special Teams Player of the Week.

=== September 10: Cincinnati ===
	1	2	3	4	Total
Cincinnati	0	3	7	14	24
Penn State	7	7	14	14	42

Michael Robinson went bombs away to the Lions' speedy freshmen as Penn State defeated the Bearcats 42–24. The offense struggled in the first half, but Robinson hooked up with Justin King for a 59-yard touchdown in the third quarter, followed by a 41-yard bomb to Derrick Williams on the next possession. In the fourth quarter, Deon Butler hooked up with Robinson for a 45-yard touchdown. Robinson finished 11 of 17 for 220 yards, three touchdowns and an interception.

Penn State's backup quarterback, sophomore Anthony Morelli, made his season debut, finishing 4 of 5 passes and scoring the Lions' final touchdown on a 1-yard keeper.

=== September 17: Central Michigan ===
	1	2	3	4	Total
Central Michigan	0	3	0	0	3
Penn State	7	19	7	7	40

Penn State displayed an aerial attack rarely seen in Beaver Stadium as the Lions defense held the Chippewas to only 172 total yards for a 40–3 win. Michael Robinson finished 14 of 23 for 274 yards, three touchdowns and an interception. Two of those touchdowns were to Deon Butler in the second quarter for 54 and 24 yards. Terrell Golden caught the third touchdown, a 47 yarder in the third quarter.

Robinson was pulled halfway through the third quarter for backup Anthony Morelli, who finished 8 of 13 for 107 yards, including a 55-yard touchdown to Ethan Kilmer.

=== September 24: Northwestern ===
	1	2	3	4	Total
Penn State	0	14	3	17	34
Northwestern	10	13	0	6	29

Michael Robinson led a come-from-behind 34–29 win against the Wildcats, but in the first half Robinson threw three interceptions and lost a fumble to dig a deep hole for the Lions. But the offense recovered in the second half and outscored the Wildcats 17–6 in the fourth quarter to escape with the win.

The defining drive came with two minutes left, trailing by two points. On a fourth-and-15, Robinson threw a 20-yard strike to tight end Isaac Smolko. Five plays later, Robinson lobbed a 36-yard pass to Derrick Williams who caught the ball, ducked to avoid a defender, and dashed into the end zone. Anwar Phillips picked off Northwestern's Brett Basanez to seal the win.

Williams' touchdown reception from Robinson was selected as the Pontiac Game Changing Performance of the week.

Linebacker Paul Posluszny recorded a career-high 22 tackles, the most by a Penn State player since 1977, and was named the Big Ten Defensive Player of the Week.

=== October 1: Minnesota ===
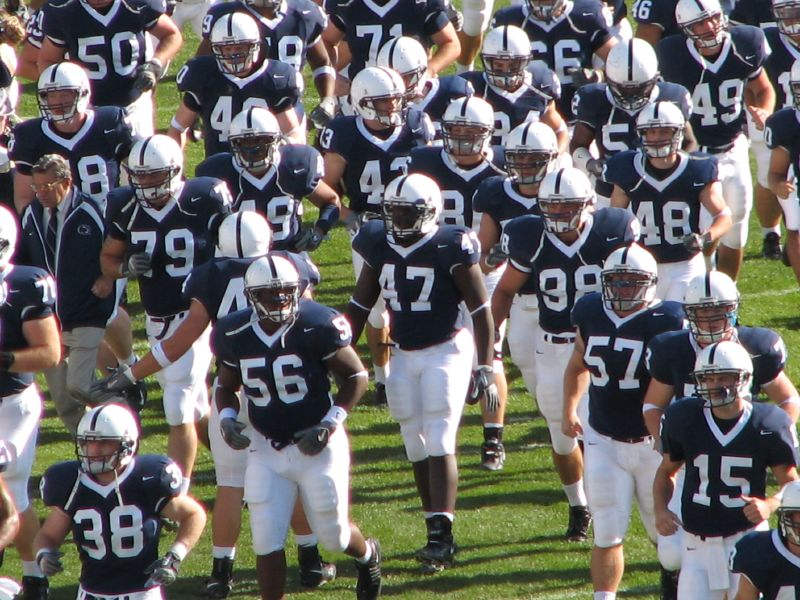
The Nittany Lions taking the field against Minnesota in 2005.

	1	2	3	4	Total
No. 18 Minnesota	0	7	0	7	14
Penn State	10	10	17	7	44

Penn State went to the power running game and tallied 364 yards on the ground en route to a 44–14 thumping of the Golden Gophers. Tony Hunt ran for 114 yards, and Michael Robinson ran for 112 yards, his first 100-yard rushing game, including a hard hit on Gophers safety Brandon Owens. Robinson never went down, but Owens was knocked out and needed help off the field, ending his football career with uprooted nerves in his spinal column. Hunt and Derrick Williams each scored two rushing touchdowns.

The defense held the Gophers to just 287 total yards and 13 first downs. (In contrast, Penn State had 35 first downs.) Minnesota tailback Laurence Maroney entered the game as the nation's leader in rushing yards and all-purpose yards, rushing for at least 100 yards in the last six games, and was considered by some to be the frontrunner for the Heisman. The Lions' defense held Maroney to only 46 yards on 16 carries.

After recording nine tackles, Paul Posluszny was named the Walter Camp National Defensive Player of the Week as well as the Big Ten Co-Defensive Player of the Week.

=== October 8: Ohio State ===
	1	2	3	4	Total
No. 6 Ohio State	3	7	0	0	10
No. 16 Penn State	0	14	3	0	17

Penn State defeated the Buckeyes 17–10 in front of 109,839 fans, during a student White Out, at the time the second-largest Beaver Stadium crowd (topped later the same season by the home game versus Wisconsin). Michael Robinson threw for 78 yards and carried the ball 14 times for 52 yards and a touchdown. Calvin Lowry intercepted Ohio State QB Troy Smith and returned the ball to the 2-yard line, setting up Robinson's touchdown.

Ohio State, needing to score a game-tying touchdown, began their final possession on their own 11-yard line with under 4 minutes to play. After moving the ball into Penn State territory, Tamba Hali sacked Smith at midfield, forcing a fumble recovered by Scott Paxson and allowing the Nittany Lions to run out the clock. Led by Paul Posluszny who had 14 tackles and a sack in the game, the Penn State defense held the Buckeyes to only 230 total yards.

Posluszny was named the Big Ten Co-Defensive Player of the Week, the first time that a Big Ten player has been named in three consecutive weeks. The team was named the Tostitos Fiesta Bowl National Team of the Week by the Football Writers Association of America.

The game was ESPN's second largest audience for a regular season college football game. That morning's ESPN's College Gameday, which broadcast from University Park for the first time since 1999, was the most-viewed edition of that program in its history.

=== October 15: Michigan ===
	1	2	3	4	Total
No. 8 Penn State	0	0	3	22	25
Michigan	0	3	7	17	27

The Wolverines defeated the Nittany Lions 27–25 on the game's final play to hand Penn State its first and only loss of the season. It would cap a wild fourth quarter where the two teams would combine for 39 points and four lead changes. Down 10–3 in the fourth, the Lions would quickly strike twice, the first would be a Michael Robinson two yard keeper set up by a Tony Hunt 61-yard run. On the Wolverines next drive, Alan Zemaitis would strip Michigan quarterback Chad Henne during the tackle and returned it 35 yards for the score. Kicker Kevin Kelly would put Penn State up 18–10 after a picking up a bad snap on the extra point and running it in for the two-point conversion.

Michigan would score on its next two drives to go up 21–18, but the defense would get the ball back to Robinson, who would put together an 81-yard drive, including a 4th down and 7 yard conversion, and score on a 3-yard keeper with :53 left to give the Lions a 25–21 lead.

However, the game would come down to seconds. Michigan's final drive, fueled by a Steve Breaston kick return to midfield, started with an apparent interception that was later reviewed to be out of bounds. The Wolverines called timeout after a Henne pass completion with the clock stopped at :28. Michigan head coach Lloyd Carr called the officials over, and after a protest by Carr and a long conference, the officials reset the game clock to 0:30. Those extra two seconds would turn out to impact the outcome of the game. Six plays later, with 0:01 on the clock, Michigan would score the game-winning touchdown on a Henne pass to Mario Manningham.

Derrick Williams was lost for the rest of the season when he broke his left arm when tackled on a kickoff return late in the game.

=== October 22: Illinois ===
	1	2	3	4	Total
No. 12 Penn State	28	28	7	0	63
Illinois	3	0	0	7	10

Penn State scored touchdowns on its first four possessions en route to a 63–10 rout of the Fighting Illini. The Illini scored an early field goal, but would never regain the lead. Michael Robinson led the charge with four touchdown passes on his first six completions, connecting with Ethan Kilmer, Patrick Hall, and twice with Deon Butler. Robinson would rush for two more in the second quarter before sitting out the rest of the game.

In the second half, Anthony Morelli quarterbacked a more conservative offense, attempting only two passes and constantly handing off to Austin Scott who had 57 rushing yards. Very late in the fourth quarter, the Illini scored their only touchdown of the game, to make the final score 63–10.

The defense did their share of scoring too. In the second quarter, Tim Shaw hit Illini quarterback Tim Brasic and forced a fumble, picked up by Dan Connor who ran it in 18 yards for the touchdown. In the third quarter, Nolan McCready, from Wyomissing, Pa, would return an interception 77 yards for the final Lions touchdown.

For his six touchdown performance, Robinson was named the Big Ten Offensive Player of the Week. Robinson's six touchdowns ties a school record set in 1917, and his career-high four touchdown passes ties an 88-year-old school record. The Nittany Lions' 56 first-half points broke the school record of 55 set in 1947.

=== October 29: Purdue ===
Purdue Boilermakers (2–5) at #11 Penn State Nittany Lions (7–1)

Quarter	1	2	3	4	Total
Purdue	7	0	0	8	15
Penn St	3	13	7	10	33

at Beaver Stadium, University Park, Pennsylvania

- Date: October 29
- Game time: 3:30 p.m. EST
- Game weather: Partly sunny, 49 °F (9 °C)
- Game attendance: 109,467
- Referee: S. Newman
- Box Score

Game information

First quarter

- PSU – Kevin Kelly 27-yard field goal, 7:22. Penn St 3–0. Drive: 13 plays, 85 yards, 5:16.
- PUR – Curtis Painter 24-yard run, 3:35. Purdue 7–3. Drive: 1 play, 24 yards, 0:08.

Second quarter

- PSU – Kevin Kelly 25-yard field goal, 14:15. Purdue 7–6. Drive: 7 plays, 31 yards, 2:31.
- PSU – Michael Robinson 1-yard run (Kevin Kelly kick), 8:18. Penn St 13–7. Drive: 8 plays, 80 yards, 3:53.
- PSU – Kevin Kelly 33-yard field goal, 0:00. Penn St 16–7. Drive: 5 plays, 60 yards, 0:34.

Third quarter

- PSU – BranDon Snow 2-yard run (Kevin Kelly kick), 12:42. Penn St 23–7. Drive: 4 plays, 42 yards, 2:08.

Fourth quarter

- PUR – Brandon Kirsch 4-yard run (run good), 9:50. Penn St 23–15. Drive: 7 plays, 58 yards, 1:30.
- PSU – Kevin Kelly 22-yard field goal, 5:41. Penn St 26–15. Drive: 8 plays, 61 yards, 4:09.
- PSU – BranDon Snow 4-yard run (Kevin Kelly kick), 1:37. Penn St 33–15. Drive: 7 plays, 53 yards, 3:52.

Top passers

- PUR – Brandon Kirsch – 11/21, 102 yards, INT
- PSU – Michael Robinson – 13/29, 213 yards

Top rushers

- PUR – Jerod Void – 10 rushes, 57 yards
- PSU – Tony Hunt – 24 rushes, 129 yards

Top receivers

- PUR – Kyle Ingraham – 7 receptions, 77 yards
- PSU – Jordan Norwood – 4 receptions, 59 yards

Special teams stood out as Penn State defeated the Boilermakers 33–15. Ethan Kilmer had six special teams tackles and a forced fumble that led to a field goal. Kevin Kelly was four for four on field goals. Rodney Kinlaw would return a kickoff 58 yards that set up a touchdown.

Michael Robinson would finish 13 of 29 for 213 yards passing and rushed for 96 yards on 19 carries and a touchdown. Tony Hunt would gain 129 yards on 24 carries, his fourth 100-yard rushing game this season. Fullback BranDon Snow would score his first two career touchdowns on runs of 2 and 4 yards.

=== November 5: Wisconsin ===
	1	2	3	4	Total
No. 14 Wisconsin	0	0	0	14	14
No. 10 Penn State	7	14	0	14	35

On senior day with the Big Ten title on the line in front of the season's second student White Out, Penn State cruised to a convincing 35–14 win over the Badgers behind the strong performance of both the offense and defense. The Lions struck first with a 43-yard pass from Michael Robinson to Deon Butler on the first drive. Butler would finish with five catches for 125 yards. Robinson finished 13 of 28 for 238 yards, two interceptions and two touchdowns, both to Butler, and also rush for 125 yards on 16 carries. Tony Hunt rushed for 151 yards on 24 carries and two touchdowns.

Wisconsin tailback Brian Calhoun, a Heisman Trophy candidate, entered the game ranked fifth nationally in all-purpose yardage and rushing yardage and led the nation with 21 touchdowns. However, the defense limited Calhoun to only 38 yard rushing. The Lions defense was also constantly in the Badgers backfield, tallying nine sacks, four by Tamba Hali who also had nine tackles. Wisconsin's net rushing yardage was minus-11 yards. Alan Zemaitis and Calvin Lowry each intercepted the Badgers once.

Hali was named the Walter Camp National Defensive Player of the Week and the Big Ten Defensive Player of the Week. He was also named Player of the Week by Sporting News, Sports Illustrated and USA Today.

=== November 19: Michigan State ===
	1	2	3	4	Total
No. 5 Penn State	3	14	7	7	31
Michigan State	0	0	14	8	22

ESPN's College Gameday broadcast from East Lansing, covering a Penn State game for the second time this season.

The Lions captured the Big Ten title and a BCS bowl berth with a 31–22 win over the Spartans. Alan Zemaitis intercepted Spartans quarterback Drew Stanton three times and also tallied seven tackles. Nickelback Donnie Johnson also had an interception to preserve a 17–0 Lions lead at the half. Johnson's biggest play however may be a blocked punt earlier in the second quarter that was recovered by backup fullback Matt Hahn in the end zone, his first career touchdown.

Michael Robinson finished 10 of 20 for 105 yards and a touchdown and also rushed for 90 yards on 13 carries, including a 33-yard touchdown run, the longest rushing touchdown of his career. Tony Hunt finished with 89 yards on 20 carries and a touchdown, pushing him past 1,000 yards rushing this season.

Zemaitis was named Walter Camp National Defensive Player of the Week and the Big Ten Defensive Player of the Week. Johnson was named the Big Ten Special Teams Player of the Week.

=== January 3: 2006 Orange Bowl – Florida State ===
	1	2	3	4	OT	2OT	3OT	Total
No. 3 Penn State	7	7	0	2	0	7	3	26
No. 22 Florida State	0	13	0	3	0	7	0	23

It was nearly 1:00 a.m. local time as Kevin Kelly kicked the game-winning field goal to end the triple overtime thriller 26–23 against the Seminoles. It was Kelly's third attempt to win the game, after missing at the end of regulation and in the first overtime. The teams traded touchdowns in the second overtime, and Florida State kicker Gary Cismesia missed in the first and third overtimes.

Austin Scott led the Penn State rushing attack, filling in for an injured Tony Hunt who left the game on the first possession. Scott finished with 26 carries for 110 yards and two touchdowns. Michael Robinson was 21 of 39 for 253 yards passing, including a 24-yard touchdown pass to Ethan Kilmer, who made an acrobatic catch in the end zone over the back of a Seminoles defender at the end of the first half.

Penn State's receivers also posted a number of career highs. Kilmer set career highs with six catches for 79 yards and a touchdown. Jordan Norwood had career highs with six receptions for 110 yards, and Justin King made a career-high five receptions for 27 yards.

Paul Posluszny injured his knee in the fourth quarter while attempting to leap over a blocker, causing partial tears of his posterior cruciate ligament (PCL) and medial collateral ligament (MCL). The injury would not require surgery but needed six to eight weeks to rehabilitate.

== Rankings ==
Ranking movements Legend: ██ Increase in ranking ██ Decrease in ranking RV = Received votes
	Week															
Poll	Pre	1	2	3	4	5	6	7	8	9	10	11	12	13	14	Final
AP	RV	RV	RV	RV	RV	16	8	12	11	10	6	5	4	4	3	3
Coaches	RV	RV	RV	RV	RV	18	10	14	12	11	6	5	4	4	3	3
Harris	Not released				RV	19	9	12	11	10	6	5	4	3	3	Not released
BCS	Not released							10	9	7	5	4	3	3	3	Not released

== Awards ==
=== Watchlists ===
- Dan Connor
  Chuck Bednarik Award watchlist
- Tamba Hali
  Ted Hendricks Award finalist
  Bronko Nagurski Trophy finalist
- Tony Hunt
  Maxwell Award watchlist
- Jeremy Kapinos
  Ray Guy Award watchlist
- Joe Paterno
  AFCA Coach of the Year finalist
  Eddie Robinson Coach of the Year finalist
  George Munger Award semifinalist and finalist
- Paul Posluszny
  Bronko Nagurski Trophy watchlist
  Chuck Bednarik Award watchlist, semifinalist and finalist
  Dick Butkus Award watchlist, semifinalist and finalist
  Lombardi Award semifinalist and finalist
- Michael Robinson
  Maxwell Award watchlist
  Davey O'Brien Award semifinalist
  Johnny Unitas Golden Arm Award watchlist
- Alan Zemaitis
  Bronko Nagurski Trophy watchlist
  Chuck Bednarik Award watchlist
  Jim Thorpe Award watchlist and semifinalist

=== Players ===
- Jay Alford
  ESPN.com All-Bowl Team
  Second-team All-Big Ten (conference media selection)
- Levi Brown
  First-team All-Big Ten (conference coaches selection)
  Second-team Associated Press All-American
- Tamba Hali
  AFCA All-American
  First-team Associated Press All-American
  First-team Sporting News All-American
  First-team Walter Camp All-American
  Big Ten Defensive Lineman of the Year
  First-team All-Big Ten
  FWAA All-American
  Sports Illustrated mid-season All-American
  Walter Camp National Defensive Player of the Week (November 5)
  Big Ten Defensive Player of the Week (November 5)
  Sporting News National Player of the Week (November 5)
  Sports Illustrated National Player of the Week (November 5)
  USA Today Player of the Week (November 5)
- Tony Hunt
  Second-team All-Big Ten (conference coaches selection)
- Donnie Johnson
  Big Ten Special Teams Player of the Week (November 19)
- Jeremy Kapinos
  Big Ten Special Teams Player of the Week (September 3)
- Calvin Lowry
  First-team All-Big Ten (conference coaches selection)
- Nolan McCready
  ESPN The Magazine CoSIDA Academic All-District
- Scott Paxson
  First-team All-Big Ten (conference coaches selection)
- Paul Posluszny
  2005 Bednarik Award winner
  2005 Butkus Award winner
  First-team ESPN The Magazine CoSIDA Academic All-American
  First-team Associated Press All-American
  First-team Sporting News All-American
  First-team Walter Camp All-American
  First-team All-Big Ten
  FWAA All-American
  ESPN The Magazine CoSIDA Academic All-District
  CBS Sports mid-season All-American
  College Football News mid-season All-American
  Sports Illustrated mid-season All-American
  Walter Camp National Defensive Player of the Week (October 1)
  Big Ten Defensive Player of the Week (September 24)
  Big Ten Defensive Player of the Week (October 1)
  Big Ten Defensive Player of the Week (October 8)
- Matthew Rice
  Second-team All-Big Ten (conference media selection)
- Michael Robinson
  Big Ten Offensive Player of the Year (conference coaches selection)
  Chicago Tribune Silver Football Award winner
  Second-team All-Big Ten
  Big Ten Offensive Player of the Week (October 22)
- Derrick Williams
  ESPN/Pontiac Game Changing Performance (September 24)
- Alan Zemaitis
  Second-team Associated Press All-American
  Second-team Walter Camp All-American
  Second-team Sporting News All-American
  First-team All-Big Ten
  Walter Camp National Defensive Player of the Week (November 19)
  Big Ten Defensive Player of the Week (November 19)

=== Coaches ===
- Joe Paterno
  AFCA Coach of the Year
  Associated Press Coach of the Year
  Bobby Dodd Coach of the Year
  Home Depot Coach of the Year
  Sporting News College Football Coach of the Year
  Walter Camp Coach of the Year
  George Munger Award winner
  Dave McClain Big Ten Coach of the Year

=== Other awards ===
2005 Lambert Trophy winner
FWAA Tostitos Fiesta Bowl National Team of the Week (October 8)

== Postseason ==
Penn State finished the season ranked number 3 in both the final AP and Coaches college football polls, earning Penn State its 13th Top 5 finish under Joe Paterno.

The team's unexpected success helped Penn State finish in the top four in football attendance for the 15th consecutive year, averaging 104,859 for seven home games. Three crowds topped 109,000: 109,865 vs. Wisconsin, 109,839 vs. Ohio State, and 109,467 vs. Purdue, ranking two through four as the largest crowds ever at Beaver Stadium. Penn State finished the season with a sellout crowd of 77,773 at the FedEx Orange Bowl.

Instead of declaring early for the NFL draft, Levi Brown and Paul Posluszny both announced their intentions to return for their senior season.

=== NFL draft ===
Six seniors would go on and be drafted in the 2006 NFL draft.

Round	Pick	Overall	Name	Position	Team
1st	20	20	Tamba Hali	Defensive end	Kansas City Chiefs
4th	3	100	Michael Robinson	Running back	San Francisco 49ers
4th	5	102	Calvin Lowry	Free safety	Tennessee Titans
4th	25	122	Alan Zemaitis	Cornerback	Tampa Bay Buccaneers
6th	31	200	Tyler Reed	Offensive guard	Chicago Bears
7th	1	209	Ethan Kilmer	Free safety	Cincinnati Bengals

=== All-star games ===
Game	Date	Site	Players
60th Hula Bowl	January 21, 2006	Aloha Stadium, Honolulu, HI	Calvin Lowry, Scott Paxson, Matthew Rice
57th Senior Bowl	January 28, 2006	Ladd–Peebles Stadium, Mobile, AL	Tamba Hali, Anwar Phillips, Michael Robinson *
* Alan Zemaitis was also invited to play in the Senior Bowl but did not attend
