= 2006 Orange Bowl =

2006 FedEx Orange Bowl
- BCS Bowl Game; 72nd Orange Bowl
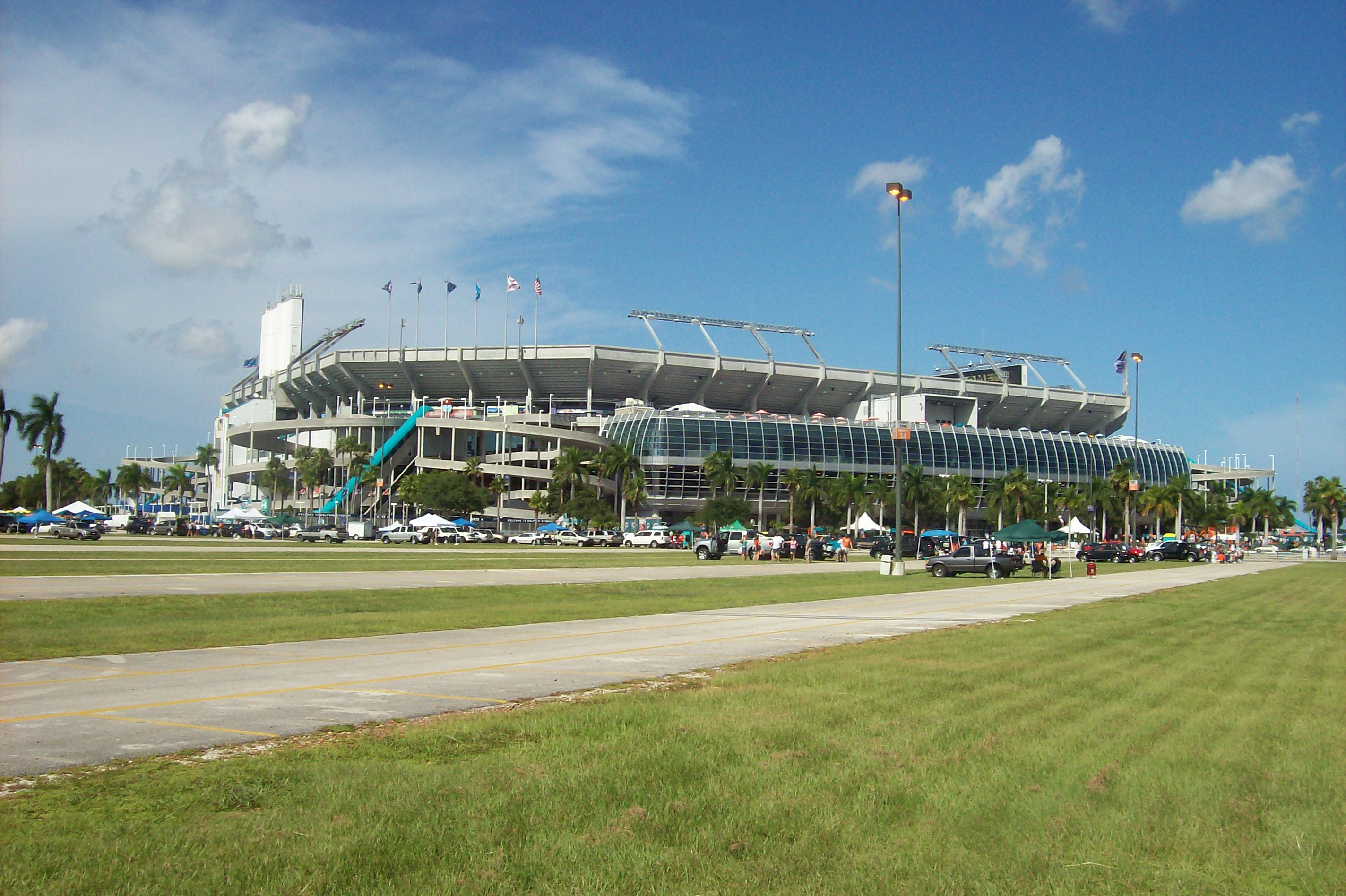
- Dolphin Stadium in Miami Gardens, Florida, hosted the Orange Bowl.
Penn State Nittany Lions	Florida State Seminoles
(10–1)	(8–4)
Big Ten	ACC
26	23
Head coach: Joe Paterno	Head coach: Bobby Bowden
AP / Coaches / BCS; 3 / 3 / 3	AP / Coaches / BCS; 22 / 22 / 22
	1	2	3	4	OT	2OT	3OT	Total
Penn State	7	7	0	2	0	7	3	26
Florida State	0	13	0	3	0	7	0	23
- Date: January 3, 2006
- Season: 2005
- Stadium: Dolphins Stadium
- Location: Miami Gardens, Florida
- MVP: FSU WR Willie Reid
- Favorite: Penn State by 9 (46.5)
- Referee: Jerry McGinn (Big East)
- Attendance: 77,912
- Payout: US$13,500,000

United States TV coverage
- Network: ABC
- Announcers: Mike Tirico (Play by Play); Kirk Herbstreit (Analyst); Erin Andrews (Sideline)
- Nielsen ratings: 12.2

The 2006 Orange Bowl, a 2005–06 BCS game, was played on January 3, 2006. This 72nd edition to the Orange Bowl featured the Penn State Nittany Lions and the Florida State Seminoles.

This game was known for being the eighth, and ultimately final meeting, between the two coaches, Joe Paterno of Penn State and Bobby Bowden of Florida State, the two winningest D1 FBS coaches in history.

== Overtime summary ==
The three-overtime game took over four hours. It is regarded as one of the more entertaining Orange Bowls due to the high excitement level and some key missed kicks.

Florida State started on offense to begin the first overtime. Kicker Gary Cismesia's 44-yard attempt went wide right. Penn State conservatively rushed three times and attempted a 38-yard field goal on their first overtime drive. However, kicker Kevin Kelly's try pushed wide left.

In the second overtime, both team scored on 1-yard touchdown runs tying the game at 23–23.

In the third overtime, Florida State's kicking woes continued. Cismesia's 38-yard attempt hit the right upright. On 2nd and 9 on the 12-yard line, Kelly hit a 29-yard field goal to give Joe Paterno and the Nittany Lions the win over Bobby Bowden and the Seminoles.

== Scoring summary ==
Scoring Play	Score	Time
1st quarter
PSU – Scott 2 yard run	PSU 7–0	4:59
2nd quarter
FSU – Reid 87 yard punt return	Tie 7–7	4:09
FSU – Booker 57 yard pass from Weatherford (missed PAT)	FSU 13–7	2:49
PSU – Kilmer 24 yard pass from Robinson	PSU 14–13	0:06
3rd quarter
No scoring
4th quarter
PSU – Safety	PSU 16–13	13:36
FSU – Cismesia 48 yard FG	Tie 16–16	4:08
Overtime
PSU – Scott 1 yard run	PSU 23–16	2OT
FSU – Dean 1 yard run	Tie 23–23	2OT
PSU – Kelly 29 yard FG	PSU 26–23	3OT

== Aftermath ==
Florida State had a rough season for their standards having lost four games going into their ACC Championship game against Virginia Tech. They were solid underdogs (2 TD) and still found a way to upset the Hokies in the first ever ACC title game.

Penn State was one play away from an undefeated season albeit both USC and Texas likely would have still played for the BCS title that season. The Nittany Lions finished third in the final AP Poll.
