= 1950 Senior Bowl =

- 1st Senior Bowl
- Official program cover
North Yankees	South Rebels
13	22
Head coach: Bo McMillin (Detroit Lions)	Head coach: Steve Owen (New York Giants)
	1	2	3	4	Total
North	7	6	0	0	13
South	0	7	7	8	22
- Date: January 7, 1950
- Season: 1949
- Stadium: Gator Bowl Stadium
- Location: Jacksonville, Florida
- MVP: Travis Tidwell (QB, Auburn)
- Referee: T. G. Kain (SEC)
- Attendance: 20,000

The 1950 Senior Bowl was a college football exhibition game featuring players from the 1949 college football season and prospects in the 1950 NFL draft. The inaugural edition of the Senior Bowl was played on January 7, 1950, at Gator Bowl Stadium in Jacksonville, Florida. The teams were coached by personnel from the National Football League (NFL); Bo McMillin of the Detroit Lions for the North, and Steve Owen of the New York Giants for the South. The game was broadcast on the Mutual Radio Network. After the North took an early 13–0 lead, the South came from behind for a 22–13 victory. South quarterback Travis Tidwell of Auburn completed 13 of 19 passes for 246 yards and was named game MVP.

The day after the game, it was announced that eight players from the Southwestern Conference (SWC) who had participated in the game would lose their scholarships; although each had completed their college sports career, they had not yet completed their college studies. The SWC schools ended the players' scholarships because they had accepted payment for appearing in the Senior Bowl, with each of the 26 players on the winning team receiving $475 and each of the 24 players on the losing team receiving $343, coming from 60 percent of the ticket sales. While the players accepted payment knowing that their scholarships could be ended, Senior Bowl organizer Jimmy Pearre pointed out that the colleges "have made millions off these players". The players and their college teams were:

- Arkansas: Theron Roberts
- Baylor: J. D. Ison, Rupert Wright
- SMU: Jack Halliday, Dick McKissack, Doak Walker
- Texas: Ray Borneman, Paul Campbell

This would prove to be the only edition of the Senior Bowl played in Jacksonville, as the game moved to Mobile, Alabama, in 1951 and has remained there since. In 1994, Gator Bowl Stadium was closed and demolished; it was replaced with Jacksonville Municipal Stadium in 1995.

== Game summary ==
1950 Senior Bowl

Quarter	1	2	3	4	Total
North	7	6	0	0	13
South	0	7	7	8	22

at Gator Bowl Stadium • Jacksonville, Florida

- Date: Saturday, January 7, 1950
- Game time: 2:30 p.m. EST
- Game attendance: 20,000
- Referee: Thomas G. "Shaky" Kain

Game information

First Quarter

- NORTH – Lynn Chandnois (Michigan State) 4-yard run, Doak Walker (SMU) kick good; NORTH 7–0

Second Quarter

- NORTH – Jim Owens (Oklahoma) 46-yard pass from Eddie LeBaron (Pacific), Walker kick blocked; NORTH 13–0
- SOUTH – Herb Rich (Vanderbilt) 55-yard pass from Travis Tidwell (Auburn), Dick Sheffield (Tulane) kick good; NORTH 13–7

Third Quarter

- SOUTH – Red O'Quinn (Wake Forest) 13-yard pass from Tidwell, Sheffield kick good; SOUTH 14–13

Fourth Quarter

- SOUTH – Eddie Price (Tulane) 1-yard run, Sheffield kick no good; SOUTH 20–13
- SOUTH – LeBaron punt blocked by Jim Duncan (Wake Forest) for a safety; SOUTH 22–13
