= Willie Reid (American football) =

American football player (born 1982)

No. 15
- Position: Wide receiver

Personal information
- Born: September 19, 1982 (age 44); Kathleen, Georgia, U.S.
- Listed height: 5 ft 10 in (1.78 m)
- Listed weight: 192 lb (87 kg)

Career information
- High school: Warner Robins (GA)
- College: Florida State
- NFL draft: 2006: 3rd round, 95th overall pick

Career history
- Pittsburgh Steelers (2006–2007); Philadelphia Eagles (2008)*; Dallas Cowboys (2009)*
- * Offseason or practice squad member only
- Stats at Pro Football Reference

Willie Louis Reid (born September 19, 1982) is an American former professional football player who was a wide receiver in the National Football League (NFL). He was selected by the Pittsburgh Steelers in the third round of the 2006 NFL draft after playing college football for the Florida State Seminoles. Reid was also a member of the Philadelphia Eagles and Dallas Cowboys.

== Early life ==
Reid attended Warner Robins High School and was a four-year letterman in football and basketball. As a junior football player, he was voted the Georgia Offensive Player of the Year and was named to the All-Southern team by the Orlando Sentinel.

== College career ==
Reid attended Florida State University, where he played as a wide receiver and punt returner. He returned a punt for an 87-yard touchdown against Penn State in the 2006 Orange Bowl, setting an Orange Bowl record. He was named the game's MVP after amassing 235 all-purpose yards (180 yards in punt returns and 55 yards in receptions). At Florida State, Reid was a social science major.

== Professional career ==
Pre-draft measurables
Height	Weight	Arm length	Hand span	40-yard dash	10-yard split	20-yard split	20-yard shuttle	Three-cone drill	Vertical jump	Broad jump
5 ft 10 1/2 in (1.79 m)	188 lb (85 kg)	30 5/8 in (0.78 m)	9 1/4 in (0.23 m)	4.37 s	1.53 s	2.59 s	4.26 s	7.06 s	37.5 in (0.95 m)	9 ft 9 in (2.97 m)
All values from NFL Combine

=== Pittsburgh Steelers ===
Reid was selected by the Pittsburgh Steelers in the third round of the 2006 NFL draft, the 95th overall pick. He was placed on injured reserve because of a foot injury. Entering the 2007 NFL season, Reid was projected as the starting punt returner for the Steelers. However, he failed to impress new coach Mike Tomlin and the Steelers traded a draft pick for veteran returner Allen Rossum. Reid was released by the Steelers on August 30, 2008.

=== Philadelphia Eagles ===
On September 1, 2008, Reid was signed to the practice squad of the Philadelphia Eagles. He was placed on injured reserve midway through the season.

=== Dallas Cowboys ===
Reid signed with the Dallas Cowboys on June 15, 2009. He was released during final cuts on September 5, 2009.
