= Senior Bowl =

College football all-star bowl game

- Panini Senior Bowl
- Stadium: Hancock Whitney Stadium
- Location: Mobile, Alabama
- Previous stadiums: Gator Bowl Stadium (1950); Ladd–Peebles Stadium (1951–2020)
- Previous locations: Jacksonville, Florida (1950)
- Operated: 1950–present
- Website: seniorbowl.com

Sponsors
- Delchamps (1996–2001); Food World (2002–2006); Under Armour (2007–2011); Nike (2012–2013); Reese's (2014–2025); Panini America (2026–present)

2025 matchup
- National vs. American (American 22–19)

2026 matchup
- National vs. American (American 17–9)

The Senior Bowl is a post-season college football all-star game played annually in late January or early February in Mobile, Alabama, which showcases the best NFL draft prospects of those players who have completed their college eligibility. Produced by the non-profit Mobile Arts & Sports Association, the game is also a charitable fund-raiser, benefiting various local and regional organizations with over US$7.8 million in donations over its history. The game is sponsored by Panini America and is televised by the NFL Network.

== History ==
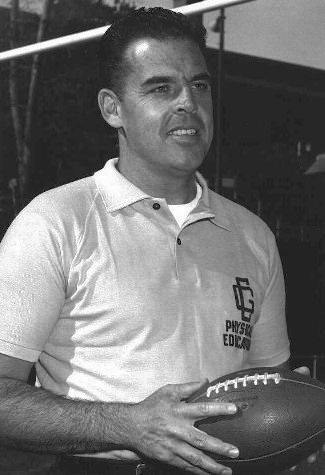
Otto Graham coached in the 1967 game.

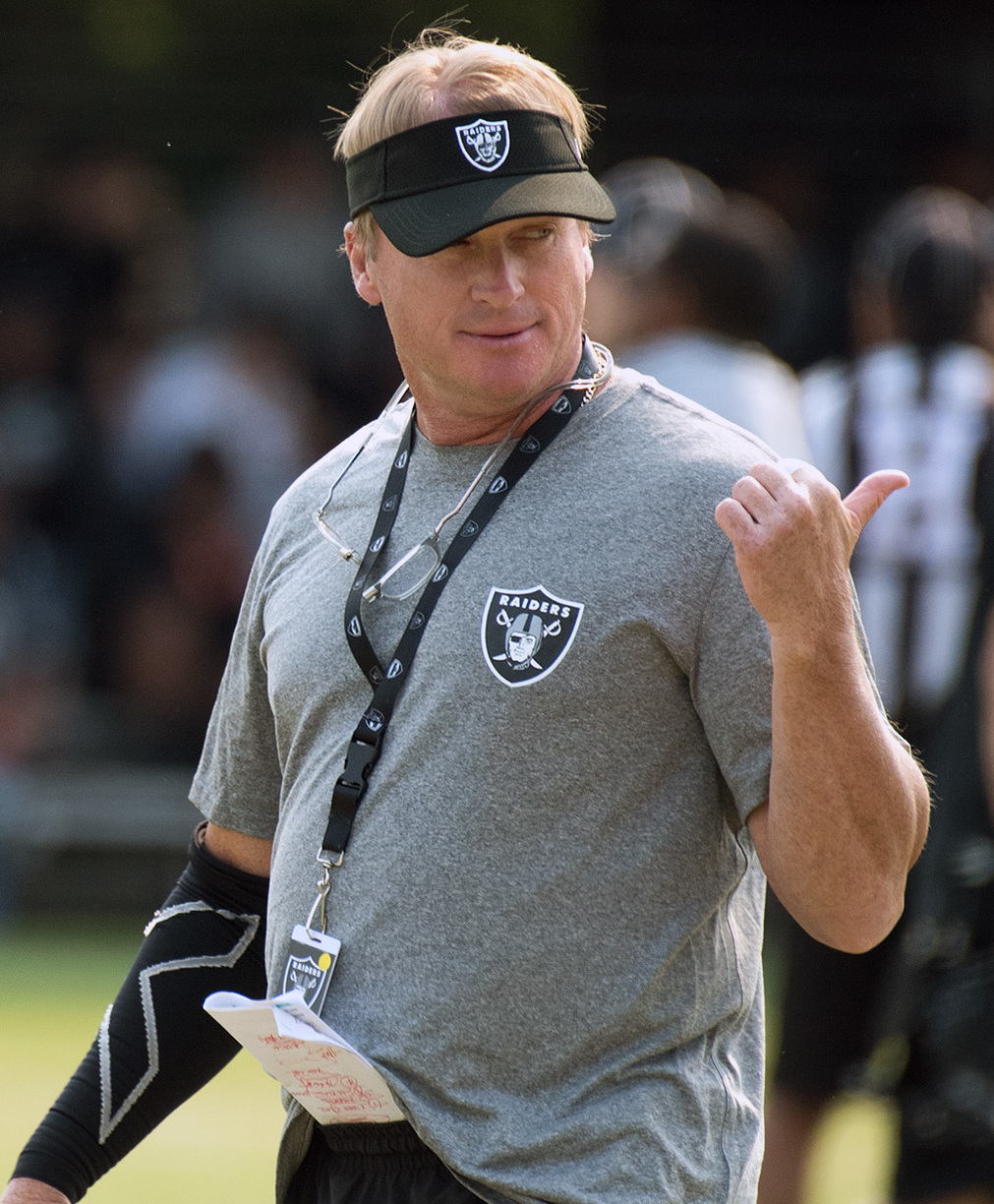
Jon Gruden has coached in four games.

The 1950 Senior Bowl, the inaugural edition, was played at Gator Bowl Stadium in Jacksonville, Florida; the game then moved to Mobile's Ladd–Peebles Stadium the next year, where it remained through the 2020 edition. Since the 2021 edition, the game has been played at Hancock Whitney Stadium on the campus of the University of South Alabama, also in Mobile.

Historically, the Senior Bowl was the first chance its participants had to openly receive pay for participation in an athletic event. Players in the inaugural 1950 game each received $343 (if on the losing team) or $475 (if on the winning team); by 1975, the amounts had been increased to $1,250 and $1,500. The 1988 edition was the last time players were paid ($1,500 and $1,750). This was one reason that participation was limited to seniors whose eligibility for further participation in college football had expired. Athletes who wished to play spring collegiate sports, such as college baseball, or otherwise remain eligible for amateur sports, had to avoid participation in the Senior Bowl.

The game has consistently been played on a Saturday in January, with the exception of 1976, when it was held on a Sunday. The scheduling date within January has varied – the earliest playing has been January 3 (1953 and 1959), while the latest playing prior to the 2022 edition has been January 30 (2010 and 2016). Since 1967, it has been traditionally set for the week before the NFL's Super Bowl (which itself is now played in February). It is usually scheduled as the final game of the college football season, although for a period during the 1980s and 1990s, it was the next-to-the-last game, followed a week later by either the Hula Bowl or the Gridiron Classic. From 2007 through 2011, and also in 2013, the Senior Bowl was again the penultimate game, followed by the Texas vs The Nation game a week later. In 2020, the revived Hula Bowl was played the day after the Senior Bowl.

CBS acquired national television coverage rights to the 1952 through 1954 games, though they never televised the games nationally under those rights. The first nationally televised Senior Bowl was in 1958 by NBC, and the games have been televised every year since. To commemorate the occasion and the publicity that the televising of the Senior Bowl would draw to the state of Alabama, Gov. James E. Folsom commissioned each player in the 1958 game as Honorary Admirals in the Alabama State Navy, as well as Senior Bowl founder Jimmy Pearre, North squad coach Joe Kuharich, South squad coach Paul Brown, and South squad past-coach Steve Owens; announcers for the televised event, Red Grange and Lindsey Nelson, were commissioned Honorary Colonels in the Alabama State Militia. ESPN televised the game as early as 1982, continuing until the game moved to the NFL Network starting with the 2007 edition.

== Sponsors and branding ==
Sponsors of the game have included Delchamps, a supermarket chain headquartered in Mobile; Food World, a supermarket chain headquartered in Birmingham; Under Armour; and Nike, Inc. Starting with the 2014 game, Reese's took over sponsorship. In January 2018, Reese's announced that they were extending their sponsorship of the game through at least the 2020 edition. The final edition of the game sponsored by Reese's was held in February 2025.

In March 2020, the Senior Bowl registered "The draft starts in Mobile" as a service mark.

In October 2020, Panini America entered a multi-year agreement to produce trading cards for Senior Bowl players. In June 2025, Panini America was announced as the bowl's new title sponsor, with the game officially known as the Panini Senior Bowl.

== Game format ==
For most editions of the Senior Bowl, players have been rostered into North and South teams. In 1991, team names were changed to AFC and NFC, to distinguish where their coaching staffs were from and to stress the professional nature of the game. This was somewhat confusing, as the Senior Bowl is played early in the calendar year, typically several months before players are selected by teams in the NFL draft. Additionally, both coaching staffs for the 1993 game came from AFC teams. In 1994, team designations were reverted to the North vs. South format. In 2021, the bowl moved to American and National team designations.

The two teams are coached by coaching staffs that are selected from two NFL teams. In recent years, the coaching staffs have come from teams who finished near the bottom of the league standings, but whose coaches were not subsequently terminated. Beginning with the 2022 edition, head coaches serve in more of an advisory capacity while promoting select assistants into leadership roles on the staff.

Organizers stipulate a number of specific rules for the game, some of which are intended to reduce the chance of injury (e.g. "All blocks below the waist are prohibited"), and others that simplify what the teams need to practice and prepare for (e.g. "Only four rushers allowed, no 5-man pressures or blitzes from secondary permitted"). The game is also the players' first time competing under the slightly different professional rules (e.g. receivers must have both feet inbounds for a legal catch vs. just one foot inbounds in college football).

The week-long practice that precedes the game is attended by key NFL personnel (including coaches, general managers and scouts), who oversee the players as possible prospects for professional football. Athletes sometimes decline invitations to participate in the Senior Bowl, opting instead to prepare for the NFL scouting combine or their college's pro day.

The single-season record for number of players sent to the Senior Bowl from one school is 10 by Alabama in 1987, followed by nine sent by Auburn in 1988 and USC in 2008.

Dan Lynch of Washington State was the first (and to date only) player to appear in two Senior Bowls (1984 and 1985), having been granted an extra year of eligibility after the 1984 game. In 2013, two players (D. J. Fluker and Justin Pugh) with a year of college football eligibility remaining, but who had already graduated, became the first "fourth-year juniors" to be granted clearance to play in the Senior Bowl.

== Game results ==
Key
| North win | South win |
| American or AFC win | National or NFC win |
Tie

| Date | North / AFC / American team | | | South / NFC / National team | | | Series |
| Date | Coach | Coach's team | Score | Score | Coach's team | Coach | Series |
|---|---|---|---|---|---|---|---|
| January 7, 1950 | Bo McMillin | Detroit Lions | 13 | 22 | New York Giants | Steve Owen | South, 1–0 |
| January 6, 1951 | Bo McMillin | Detroit Lions | 18 | 19 | New York Giants | Steve Owen | South, 2–0 |
| January 5, 1952 | Paul Brown | Cleveland Browns | 20 | 6 | New York Giants | Steve Owen | South, 2–1 |
| January 3, 1953 | Paul Brown | Cleveland Browns | 28 | 13 | New York Giants | Steve Owen | Tied, 2–2 |
| January 9, 1954 | Paul Brown | Cleveland Browns | 20 | 14 | New York Giants | Steve Owen | North, 3–2 |
| January 8, 1955 | Paul Brown | Cleveland Browns | 6 | 12 | New York Giants | Steve Owen | Tied, 3–3 |
| January 7, 1956 | Buddy Parker | Detroit Lions | 2 | 12 | Cleveland Browns | Paul Brown | South, 4–3 |
| January 5, 1957 | Joe Kuharich | Washington Redskins | 7 | 21 | Cleveland Browns | Paul Brown | South, 5–3 |
| January 11, 1958 | Joe Kuharich | Washington Redskins | 15 | 13 | Cleveland Browns | Paul Brown | South, 5–4 |
| January 3, 1959 | Joe Kuharich | Washington Redskins | 12 | 21 | Cleveland Browns | Paul Brown | South, 6–4 |
| January 9, 1960 | Jim Lee Howell | New York Giants | 26 | 7 | Baltimore Colts | Weeb Ewbank | South, 6–5 |
| January 7, 1961 | Jim Lee Howell | New York Giants | 26 | 33 | Baltimore Colts | Weeb Ewbank | South, 7–5 |
| January 6, 1962 | Tom Landry | Dallas Cowboys | 7 | 42 | Baltimore Colts | Weeb Ewbank | South, 8–5 |
| January 5, 1963 | Tom Landry | Dallas Cowboys | 27 | 33 | Baltimore Colts | Weeb Ewbank | South, 9–5 |
| January 4, 1964 | George Wilson | Detroit Lions | 21 | 28 | Dallas Cowboys | Tom Landry | South, 10–5 |
| January 9, 1965 | George Wilson | Detroit Lions | 7 | 7 | Dallas Cowboys | Tom Landry | South, 10–5–1 |
| January 8, 1966 | Mike Holovak | Boston Patriots | 18 | 27 | New York Jets | Weeb Ewbank | South, 11–5–1 |
| January 7, 1967 | Norm Van Brocklin | Atlanta Falcons | 35 | 13 | Washington Redskins | Otto Graham | South, 11–6–1 |
| January 6, 1968 | Mike Holovak | Boston Patriots | 21 | 34 | Kansas City Chiefs | Hank Stram | South, 12–6–1 |
| January 11, 1969 | Allie Sherman | New York Giants | 27 | 16 | St. Louis Cardinals | Charley Winner | South, 12–7–1 |
| January 10, 1970 | Lou Saban | Denver Broncos | 37 | 37 | Baltimore Colts | Don Shula | South, 12–7–2 |
| January 9, 1971 | Lou Saban | Denver Broncos | 31 | 13 | New York Jets | Weeb Ewbank | South, 12–8–2 |
| January 8, 1972 | Alex Webster | New York Giants | 21 | 26 | New Orleans Saints | J. D. Roberts | South, 13–8–2 |
| January 6, 1973 | Lou Saban | Buffalo Bills | 30 | 33 | New York Jets | Weeb Ewbank | South, 14–8–2 |
| January 12, 1974 | Mike McCormack | Philadelphia Eagles | 16 | 13 | Detroit Lions | Don McCafferty | South, 14–9–2 |
| January 11, 1975 | John Ralston | Denver Broncos | 17 | 17 | San Francisco 49ers | Dick Nolan | South, 14–9–3 |
| January 11, 1976 | Chuck Fairbanks | New England Patriots | 42 | 35 | Chicago Bears | Jack Pardee | South, 14–10–3 |
| January 8, 1977 | Forrest Gregg | Cleveland Browns | 27 | 24 | Miami Dolphins | Don Shula | South, 14–11–3 |
| January 7, 1978 | Don Coryell | St. Louis Cardinals | 17 | 14 | Atlanta Falcons | Leeman Bennett | South, 14–12–3 |
| January 13, 1979 | Walt Michaels | New York Jets | 21 | 41 | New Orleans Saints | Dick Nolan | South, 15–12–3 |
| January 12, 1980 | Bud Grant | Minnesota Vikings | 57 | 3 | New York Giants | Ray Perkins | South, 15–13–3 |
| January 17, 1981 | Bill Walsh | San Francisco 49ers | 23 | 10 | Denver Broncos | Red Miller | South, 15–14–3 |
| January 16, 1982 | Marv Levy | Kansas City Chiefs | 10 | 27 | Pittsburgh Steelers | Chuck Noll | South, 16–14–3 |
| January 22, 1983 | Frank Kush | Baltimore Colts | 14 | 6 | New Orleans Saints | Bum Phillips | South, 16–15–3 |
| January 14, 1984 | Kay Stephenson | Buffalo Bills | 20 | 21 | San Diego Chargers | Don Coryell | South, 17–15–3 |
| January 12, 1985 | Jim Hanifan | St. Louis Cardinals | 7 | 23 | Green Bay Packers | Forrest Gregg | South, 18–15–3 |
| January 18, 1986 | Dan Reeves | Denver Broncos | 31 | 17 | Tampa Bay Buccaneers | Leeman Bennett | South, 18–16–3 |
| January 17, 1987 | John Robinson | Los Angeles Rams | 38 | 42 | Miami Dolphins | Don Shula | South, 19–16–3 |
| January 23, 1988 | Chuck Knox | Seattle Seahawks | 21 | 7 | New Orleans Saints | Jim Mora | South, 19–17–3 |
| January 21, 1989 | Dan Reeves | Denver Broncos | 12 | 13 | Los Angeles Rams | John Robinson | South, 20–17–3 |
| January 20, 1990 | Marty Schottenheimer | Kansas City Chiefs | 41 | 0 | Philadelphia Eagles | Buddy Ryan | South, 20–18–3 |
| January 19, 1991 | Marty Schottenheimer | Kansas City Chiefs | 38 | 28 | New Orleans Saints | Jim Mora | AFC, 1–0 |
| January 18, 1992 | Art Shell | Los Angeles Raiders | 13 | 10 | Chicago Bears | Mike Ditka | AFC, 2–0 |
| January 16, 1993 | Ted Marchibroda | Indianapolis Colts | 6 | 21 | Cleveland Browns | Bill Belichick | AFC, 2–1 |
| January 22, 1994 | Rich Kotite | Philadelphia Eagles | 32 | 35 | Miami Dolphins | Don Shula | South, 21–18–3 |
| January 21, 1995 | Dan Reeves | New York Giants | 7 | 14 | Indianapolis Colts | Ted Marchibroda | South, 22–18–3 |
| January 20, 1996 | Dennis Erickson | Seattle Seahawks | 25 | 10 | Chicago Bears | Dave Wannstedt | South, 22–19–3 |
| January 18, 1997 | Norv Turner | Washington Redskins | 35 | 14 | Kansas City Chiefs | Marty Schottenheimer | South, 22–20–3 |
| January 17, 1998 | Ted Marchibroda | Baltimore Ravens | 8 | 31 | Washington Redskins | Norv Turner | South, 23–20–3 |
| January 23, 1999 | Jon Gruden | Oakland Raiders | 21 | 31 | Tampa Bay Buccaneers | Tony Dungy | South, 24–20–3 |
| January 22, 2000 | George Seifert | Carolina Panthers | 24 | 21 | Kansas City Chiefs | Gunther Cunningham | South, 24–21–3 |
| January 20, 2001 | Bill Cowher | Pittsburgh Steelers | 16 | 21 | Green Bay Packers | Mike Sherman | South, 25–21–3 |
| January 26, 2002 | Mike Holmgren | Seattle Seahawks | 26 | 41 | Arizona Cardinals | Dave McGinnis | South, 26–21–3 |
| January 18, 2003 | Dom Capers | Houston Texans | 17 | 0 | Detroit Lions | Marty Mornhinweg | South, 26–22–3 |
| January 24, 2004 | Marvin Lewis | Cincinnati Bengals | 10 | 28 | San Diego Chargers | Marty Schottenheimer | South, 27–22–3 |
| January 29, 2005 | Norv Turner | Oakland Raiders | 23 | 13 | Tampa Bay Buccaneers | Jon Gruden | South, 27–23–3 |
| January 28, 2006 | Jeff Fisher | Tennessee Titans | 31 | 14 | San Francisco 49ers | Mike Nolan | South, 27–24–3 |
| January 27, 2007 | Jon Gruden | Tampa Bay Buccaneers | 27 | 0 | San Francisco 49ers | Mike Nolan | South, 27–25–3 |
| January 26, 2008 | Lane Kiffin | Oakland Raiders | 16 | 17 | San Francisco 49ers | Mike Nolan | South, 28–25–3 |
| January 24, 2009 | Marvin Lewis | Cincinnati Bengals | 18 | 35 | Jacksonville Jaguars | Jack Del Rio | South, 29–25–3 |
| January 30, 2010 | Jim Schwartz | Detroit Lions | 31 | 13 | Miami Dolphins | Tony Sparano | South, 29–26–3 |
| January 29, 2011 | Marvin Lewis | Cincinnati Bengals | 10 | 24 | Buffalo Bills | Chan Gailey | South, 30–26–3 |
| January 28, 2012 | Leslie Frazier | Minnesota Vikings | 23 | 13 | Washington Redskins | Mike Shanahan | South, 30–27–3 |
| January 26, 2013 | Dennis Allen | Oakland Raiders | 16 | 21 | Detroit Lions | Jim Schwartz | South, 31–27–3 |
| January 25, 2014 | Mike Smith | Atlanta Falcons | 10 | 20 | Jacksonville Jaguars | Gus Bradley | South, 32–27–3 |
| January 24, 2015 | Ken Whisenhunt | Tennessee Titans | 34 | 13 | Jacksonville Jaguars | Gus Bradley | South, 32–28–3 |
| January 30, 2016 | Jason Garrett | Dallas Cowboys | 16 | 27 | Jacksonville Jaguars | Gus Bradley | South, 33–28–3 |
| January 28, 2017 | John Fox | Chicago Bears | 15 | 16 | Cleveland Browns | Hue Jackson | South, 34–28–3 |
| January 27, 2018 | Vance Joseph | Denver Broncos | 16 | 45 | Houston Texans | Bill O'Brien | South, 35–28–3 |
| January 26, 2019 | Jon Gruden | Oakland Raiders | 34 | 24 | San Francisco 49ers | Kyle Shanahan | South, 35–29–3 |
| January 25, 2020 | Matt Patricia | Detroit Lions | 34 | 17 | Cincinnati Bengals | Zac Taylor | South, 35–30–3 |
| January 30, 2021 | Matt Rhule | Carolina Panthers | 24 | 27 | Miami Dolphins | Brian Flores | National, 1–0 |
| February 5, 2022 | Duce Staley | Detroit Lions | 10 | 20 | New York Jets | Ron Middleton | National, 2–0 |
| February 4, 2023 | Luke Getsy | Chicago Bears | 10 | 27 | Las Vegas Raiders | Patrick Graham | National, 3–0 |
| February 3, 2024 | Jeff Ulbrich | New York Jets | 7 | 16 | Tennessee Titans | Terrell Williams | National, 4–0 |
| February 1, 2025 | Bubba Ventrone | Cleveland Browns | 22 | 19 | New York Giants | Mike Kafka | National, 4–1 |
| January 31, 2026 | Joel Thomas | New Orleans Saints | 17 | 9 | Philadelphia Eagles | Clint Hurtt | National, 4–2 |

- All-time series, through the 2026 game (77 editions): South (35–30–3); AFC (2–1); National (4–2)
- The first game was played in Jacksonville, Florida, in 1950. All subsequent games have been played in Mobile, Alabama.

=== Game records ===
| Statistic | Record, Team | Year |
|---|---|---|
| Most points scored (winning team) | 57, North | 1980 |
| Most points scored (losing team) | 38, North | 1987 |
| Most points scored (both teams) | 80 (South 42, North 38) | 1987 |
| Fewest points allowed | 0, North | 1990; 2003; 2007 |
| Largest margin of victory | 54, North (57–3) | 1980 |

=== Coaching appearances ===
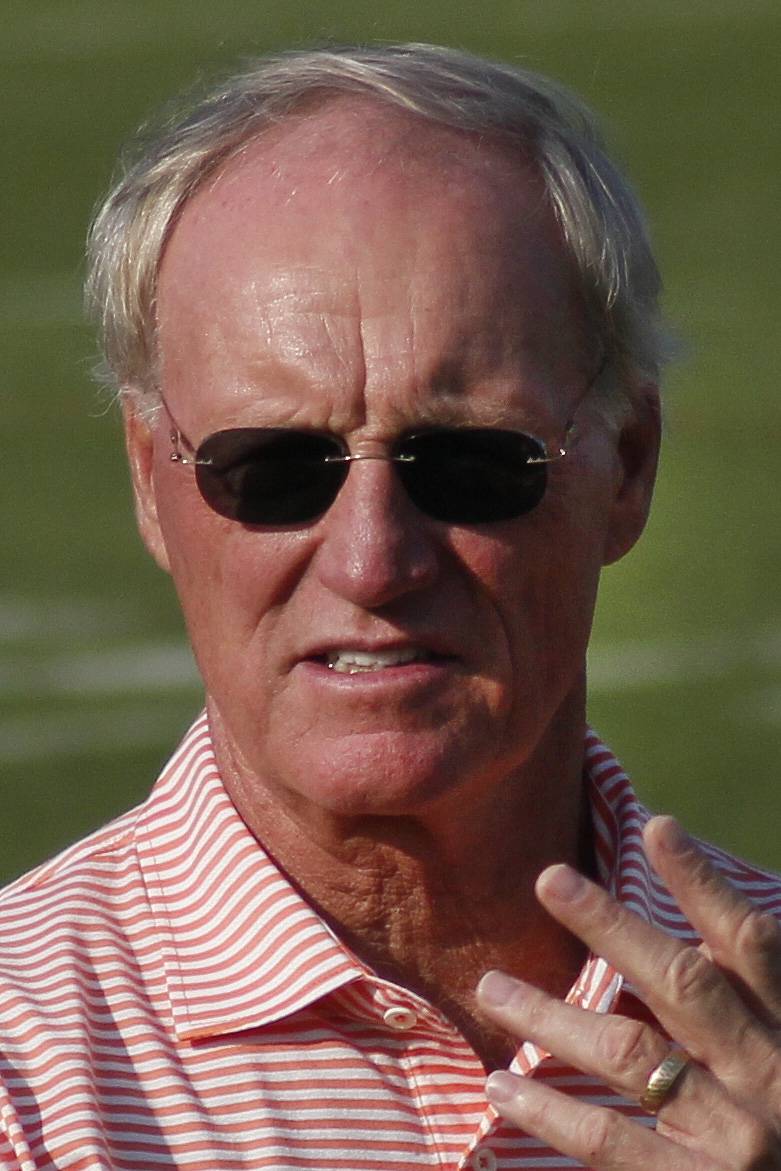
Marty Schottenheimer won three of the four Senior Bowls he coached.

Seven people have served as head coach in four or more Senior Bowls.

| Games | Head coach | W | L | T | Win pct. |
|---|---|---|---|---|---|
| 8 | Paul Brown | 6 | 2 | – | .750 |
| 7 | Weeb Ewbank | 5 | 2 | – | .714 |
| 6 | Steve Owen | 3 | 3 | – | .500 |
| 4 | Marty Schottenheimer | 3 | 1 | – | .750 |
| 4 | Don Shula | 2 | 1 | 1 | .625 |
| 4 | Jon Gruden | 2 | 2 | – | .500 |
| 4 | Tom Landry | 1 | 2 | 1 | .375 |

=== Games coached by NFL teams ===
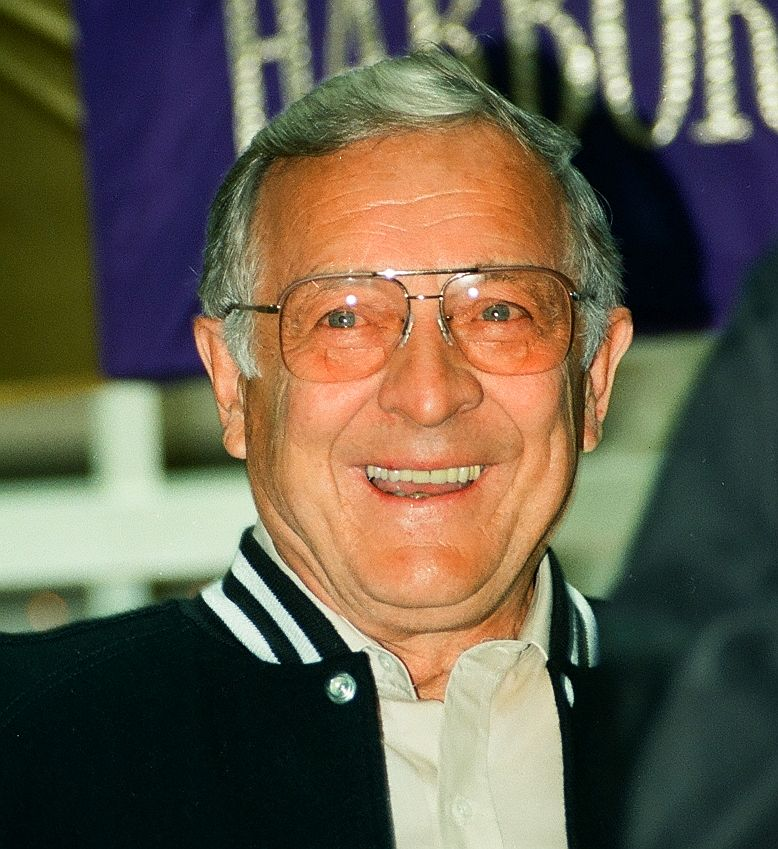
Ted Marchibroda led the Baltimore Ravens staff in their only time coaching the Senior Bowl (1998).

Each of the current 32 NFL teams has had members of their coaching staff coach in at least one Senior Bowl. Coaches from the New York Giants have coached in the most Senior Bowls, 13, while coaches from the Baltimore Ravens have only coached in one Senior Bowl.

Records include games played under a franchise's prior names (e.g. New England Patriots includes appearances when the team was known as the Boston Patriots).

Updated through the 2026 game (77 editions, 154 appearances).

| Games | NFL team | W | L | T | Win pct. | Most recent |
|---|---|---|---|---|---|---|
| 13 | New York Giants | 5 | 8 | 0 | .385 | 2025 |
| 12 | Cleveland Browns | 10 | 2 | 0 | .833 | 2025 |
| 11 | Detroit Lions | 3 | 7 | 1 | .318 | 2022 |
| 8 | Indianapolis Colts | 5 | 2 | 1 | .688 | 1995 |
| 7 | Oakland Raiders | 4 | 3 | 0 | .571 | 2023 |
| 7 | Denver Broncos | 2 | 3 | 2 | .429 | 2018 |
| 7 | Washington Commanders | 3 | 4 | 0 | .429 | 2012 |
| 6 | New York Jets | 3 | 3 | 0 | .500 | 2024 |
| 6 | Kansas City Chiefs | 3 | 3 | 0 | .500 | 2000 |
| 6 | San Francisco 49ers | 2 | 3 | 1 | .417 | 2019 |
| 6 | New Orleans Saints | 3 | 3 | 0 | .500 | 2026 |
| 5 | Miami Dolphins | 3 | 2 | 0 | .600 | 2021 |
| 5 | Dallas Cowboys | 1 | 3 | 1 | .300 | 2016 |
| 5 | Chicago Bears | 0 | 5 | 0 | .000 | 2023 |
| 4 | Jacksonville Jaguars | 3 | 1 | 0 | .750 | 2016 |
| 4 | Arizona Cardinals | 2 | 2 | 0 | .500 | 2002 |
| 4 | Tampa Bay Buccaneers | 2 | 2 | 0 | .500 | 2007 |
| 4 | Philadelphia Eagles | 1 | 3 | 0 | .250 | 2026 |
| 4 | Cincinnati Bengals | 0 | 4 | 0 | .000 | 2020 |
| 3 | Tennessee Titans | 3 | 0 | 0 | 1.000 | 2024 |
| 3 | Seattle Seahawks | 2 | 1 | 0 | .667 | 2002 |
| 3 | Atlanta Falcons | 1 | 2 | 0 | .333 | 2014 |
| 3 | Buffalo Bills | 1 | 2 | 0 | .333 | 2011 |
| 3 | New England Patriots | 1 | 2 | 0 | .333 | 1976 |
| 2 | Green Bay Packers | 2 | 0 | 0 | 1.000 | 2001 |
| 2 | Houston Texans | 2 | 0 | 0 | 1.000 | 2018 |
| 2 | Los Angeles Chargers | 2 | 0 | 0 | 1.000 | 2004 |
| 2 | Minnesota Vikings | 2 | 0 | 0 | 1.000 | 2012 |
| 2 | Carolina Panthers | 1 | 1 | 0 | .500 | 2021 |
| 2 | Los Angeles Rams | 1 | 1 | 0 | .500 | 1989 |
| 2 | Pittsburgh Steelers | 1 | 1 | 0 | .500 | 2001 |
| 1 | Baltimore Ravens | 0 | 1 | 0 | .000 | 1998 |

== MVPs ==
| Year | Name | Pos. | College team |
|---|---|---|---|
| 1950 | Travis Tidwell | QB | Auburn |
| 1951 | Bucky Curtis | WR | Vanderbilt |
| 1952 | Al Dorow | QB | Michigan State |
| 1953 | Harry Agganis | QB | Boston University |
| 1954 | Gene Filipski | RB | Villanova |
| 1955 | Bobby Freeman | QB | Auburn |
| 1956 | Don Goss | DL | SMU |
| 1957 | Don Bosseler | FB | Miami (FL) |
| 1958 | Jim Taylor | FB | LSU |
| 1959 | Theron Sapp; Norm Odyniec | FB; RB | Georgia; Notre Dame |
| 1960 | Jacky Lee | QB | Cincinnati |
| 1961 | Dick Norman | QB | Stanford |
| 1962 | Earl Gros; Ronnie Bull | RB; RB | LSU; Baylor |
| 1963 | Glynn Griffing | QB | Ole Miss |
| 1964 | Ode Burrell | RB | Mississippi State |
| 1965 | Steve DeLong | DL | Tennessee |
| 1966 | Howard Twilley | WR | Tulsa |
| 1967 | Bubba Smith | DT | Michigan State |
| 1968 | Kim Hammond | QB | Florida State |
| 1969 | Jerry Levias | WR | SMU |
| 1970 | Terry Bradshaw | QB | Louisiana Tech† |
| 1971 | J. D. Hill | WR | Arizona State |
| 1972 | Pat Sullivan | QB | Auburn |
| 1973 | Chuck Foreman | RB | Miami (FL) |
| 1974 | Bill Kollar | DL | Montana State† |
| 1975 | Steve Bartkowski | QB | California |
| 1976 | Craig Penrose | QB | San Diego State |
| 1977 | Tommy Kramer | QB | Rice |
| 1978 | James Lofton | WR | Stanford |
| 1979 | Willie Jones | DL | Florida State |
| 1980 | Marc Wilson | QB | Brigham Young |
| 1981 | Neil Lomax | QB | Portland State† |
| 1982 | John Fourcade; Steve Clark | QB; DL | Ole Miss; Utah |
| 1983 | Dan Marino; Terry Kinard | QB; DB | Pittsburgh; Clemson |
| 1984 | Walter Lewis; Doug Smith | QB; DL | Alabama; Auburn |
| 1985 | Paul Ott Carruth | RB | Alabama |
| 1986 | Napoleon McCallum | RB | Navy |

| Year | Name | Pos. | College team |
|---|---|---|---|
| 1987 | Don Smith | QB | Mississippi State |
| 1988 | Thurman Thomas | RB | Oklahoma State |
| 1989 | Cleveland Gary | RB | Miami (FL) |
| 1990 | Blair Thomas | RB | Penn State |
| 1991 | Alvin Harper | WR | Tennessee |
| 1992 | Tony Smith | RB | Southern Miss |
| 1993 | Eric Hunter | QB | Purdue |
| 1994 | Stan White | QB | Auburn |
| 1995 | Derrick Brooks | LB | Florida State |
| 1996 | Bobby Hoying | QB | Ohio State |
| 1997 | Pat Barnes | QB | California |
| 1998 | Dameyune Craig | QB | Auburn |
| 1999 | Cade McNown | QB | UCLA |
| 2000 | Chad Pennington | QB | Marshall |
| 2001 | LaDainian Tomlinson | RB | TCU |
| 2002 | Antwaan Randle El | WR | Indiana |
| 2003 | Larry Johnson | RB | Penn State |
| 2004 | Philip Rivers | QB | NC State |
| 2005 | Charlie Frye | QB | Akron |
| 2006 | Sinorice Moss | WR | Miami (FL) |
| 2007 | Tony Hunt | RB | Penn State |
| 2008 | Matt Forte | RB | Tulane |
| 2009 | Pat White | QB | West Virginia |
| 2010 | Brandon Graham | DL | Michigan |
| 2011 | Christian Ponder | QB | Florida State |
| 2012 | Isaiah Pead | RB | Cincinnati |
| 2013 | EJ Manuel | QB | Florida State |
| 2014 | Dee Ford | DL | Auburn |
| 2015 | Ameer Abdullah | RB | Nebraska |
| 2016 | Dak Prescott | QB | Mississippi State |
| 2017 | Davis Webb | QB | California |
| 2018 | Kyle Lauletta | QB | Richmond† |
| 2019 | Daniel Jones | QB | Duke |
| 2020 | Justin Herbert | QB | Oregon |
| 2021 | Kellen Mond | QB | Texas A&M |
| 2022 | Perrion Winfrey | DL | Oklahoma |
| 2023 | Jake Haener | QB | Fresno State |
| 2024 | Spencer Rattler | QB | South Carolina |
| 2025 | Jack Bech | WR | TCU |
| 2026 | Garrett Nussmeier | QB | LSU |

† denotes an MVP whose college team was not part of the top tier of college football (e.g. FBS, Division I-A, or historical predecessors) at the time they played in the Senior Bowl. There have been four such MVPs: Terry Bradshaw (Louisiana Tech, 1969 College Division season), Bill Kollar (Montana State, 1973 Division II season), Neil Lomax (Portland State, 1980 Division I–AA season), and Kyle Lauletta (Richmond, 2017 FCS season).

== Senior Bowl all-time teams ==
In the below tables, a player's induction to the College Football Hall of Fame or Pro Football Hall of Fame is indicated the HOF column with a C or P, respectively.

=== 50th anniversary ===
The following team was selected by fan voting before the 1999 game:

Offense

| Pos. | Name | College | Year | HOF |
|---|---|---|---|---|
| QB | Joe Namath | Alabama | 1965 | – P |
| RB | Walter Payton | Jackson State | 1975 | C P |
| RB | Bo Jackson | Auburn | 1986 | C – |
| RB | Franco Harris | Penn State | 1972 | – P |
| WR | Steve Largent | Tulsa | 1976 | – P |
| WR | Lynn Swann | USC | 1974 | C P |
| WR | Art Monk | Syracuse | 1980 | C P |
| TE | Ozzie Newsome | Alabama | 1978 | C P |
| OL | Gene Upshaw | Texas A&I (Note: Texas A&I is now known as Texas A&M–Kingsville.) | 1967 | – P |
| OL | Jerry Kramer | Idaho | 1958 | – P |
| OL | Mike Webster | Wisconsin | 1973 | – P |
| OL | Randall McDaniel | Arizona State | 1988 | C P |
| OL | Tom Banks | Auburn | 1970 | – – |

Defense

| Pos. | Name | College | Year | HOF |
|---|---|---|---|---|
| DL | Joe Greene | North Texas State (Note: North Texas State is now known as North Texas.) | 1969 | C P |
| DL | Ed Jones | Tennessee State | 1974 | – – |
| DL | Bubba Smith | Michigan State | 1967 | C – |
| DL | Jack Youngblood | Florida | 1971 | C P |
| LB | Lee Roy Jordan | Alabama | 1963 | C – |
| LB | Ray Nitschke | Illinois | 1958 | – P |
| LB | Derrick Thomas | Alabama | 1989 | C P |
| LB | Ted Hendricks | Miami (FL) | 1969 | C P |
| DB | Paul Krause | Iowa | 1964 | – P |
| DB | Dale Carter | Tennessee | 1992 | – – |
| DB | Albert Lewis | Grambling | 1983 | – – |
| DB | Roger Wehrli | Missouri | 1969 | C P |
| K | Morten Andersen | Michigan State | 1982 | – P |

=== 75th anniversary ===
The following team was announced in November 2023, after selection via a combination of fan voting, a poll of NFL general managers, and "consideration from the Senior Bowl's selection committee."

Offense

| Pos. | Name | College | Year | HOF |
|---|---|---|---|---|
| QB | Dan Marino | Pittsburgh | 1983 | C P |
| QB | Brett Favre | Southern Miss | 1991 | – P |
| RB | LaDainian Tomlinson | TCU | 2001 | C P |
| RB | Thurman Thomas | Oklahoma State | 1988 | C P |
| RB | Curtis Martin | Pittsburgh | 1995 | – P |
| RB | Shaun Alexander | Alabama | 2000 | – – |
| FB | Kyle Juszczyk | Harvard | 2013 | – – |
| TE | Jimmy Graham | Miami (FL) | 2010 | – – |
| WR | Terrell Owens | UT-Chattanooga | 1996 | – P |
| WR | Reggie Wayne | Miami (FL) | 2001 | – – |
| WR | Torry Holt | North Carolina State | 1999 | C – |
| T | Joe Staley | Central Michigan | 2007 | – – |
| T | Terron Armstead | Arkansas Pine-Bluff | 2013 | – – |
| T | Lane Johnson | Oklahoma | 2013 | – – |
| G | Larry Allen | Sonoma State | 1994 | – P |
| G | Steve Hutchinson | Michigan | 2001 | – P |
| G | Zack Martin | Notre Dame | 2014 | – – |
| C | Dermontti Dawson | Kentucky | 1988 | – P |
| C | Kevin Mawae | LSU | 1994 | – P |

Defense

| Pos. | Name | College | Year | HOF |
|---|---|---|---|---|
| DT | Aaron Donald | Pittsburgh | 2014 | – – |
| DT | Bryant Young | Notre Dame | 1994 | – P |
| DT | Geno Atkins | Georgia | 2010 | – – |
| DE | DeMarcus Ware | Troy | 2005 | – P |
| DE | Michael Strahan | Texas Southern | 1993 | – P |
| DE | Jason Taylor | Akron | 1997 | – P |
| OLB | Von Miller | Texas A&M | 2011 | – – |
| OLB | Cornelius Bennett | Alabama | 1987 | C – |
| ILB | Derrick Brooks | Florida State | 1995 | C P |
| ILB | Brian Urlacher | New Mexico | 2000 | C P |
| ILB | Patrick Willis | Ole Miss | 2007 | C – |
| ILB | Bobby Wagner | Utah State | 2012 | – – |
| S | Brian Dawkins | Clemson | 1996 | – P |
| S | Bob Sanders | Iowa | 2004 | – – |
| S | LeRoy Butler | Florida State | 1990 | – P |
| CB | Richard Sherman | Stanford | 2011 | – – |
| CB | Patrick Surtain Sr. | Southern Miss | 1998 | – – |
| CB | Aeneas Williams | Southern | 1991 | – P |

Special teams

| Pos. | Name | College | Year | HOF |
|---|---|---|---|---|
| K | Phil Dawson | Texas | 1998 | – – |
| P | Pat McAfee | West Virginia | 2009 | – – |
| RS | Darren Sproles | Kansas State | 2005 | C – |

== Heisman Trophy winners ==
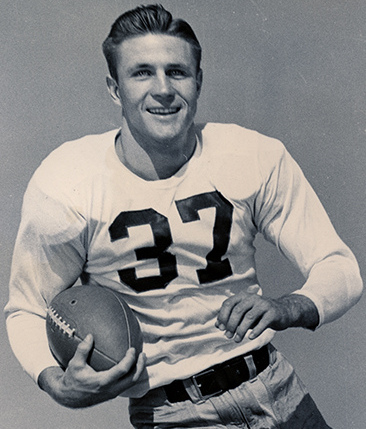
Doak Walker, the 1948 Heisman Trophy winner, played in the inaugural Senior Bowl in 1950.

The following players who won the Heisman Trophy also played in the Senior Bowl. To date, the only Heisman Trophy winner to be named Senior Bowl MVP was Pat Sullivan in 1972.

| Player | Pos. | Heisman season | Senior Bowl | Ref. |
|---|---|---|---|---|
| Doak Walker | HB | 1948 | 1950 | |
| Alan Ameche | FB | 1954 | 1955 | |
| Pat Sullivan | QB | 1971 | 1972 | |
| John Cappelletti | RB | 1973 | 1974 | |
| Bo Jackson | RB | 1985 | 1986 | |
| Carson Palmer | QB | 2002 | 2003 | |
| Troy Smith | QB | 2006 | 2007 | |
| Tim Tebow | QB | 2007 | 2010 | |
| Baker Mayfield | QB | 2017 | 2018 | |

2020 winner DeVonta Smith accepted an invitation to the 2021 edition, but did not play.

== Senior Bowl Hall of Fame ==
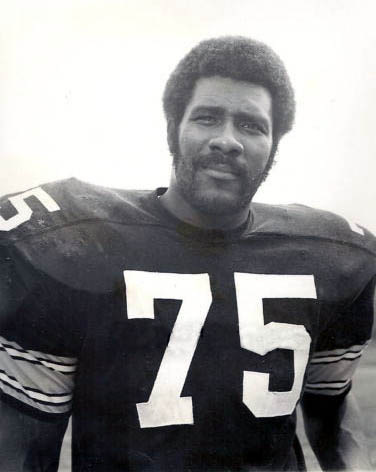
"Mean" Joe Greene, one of the 1988 inaugural inductees

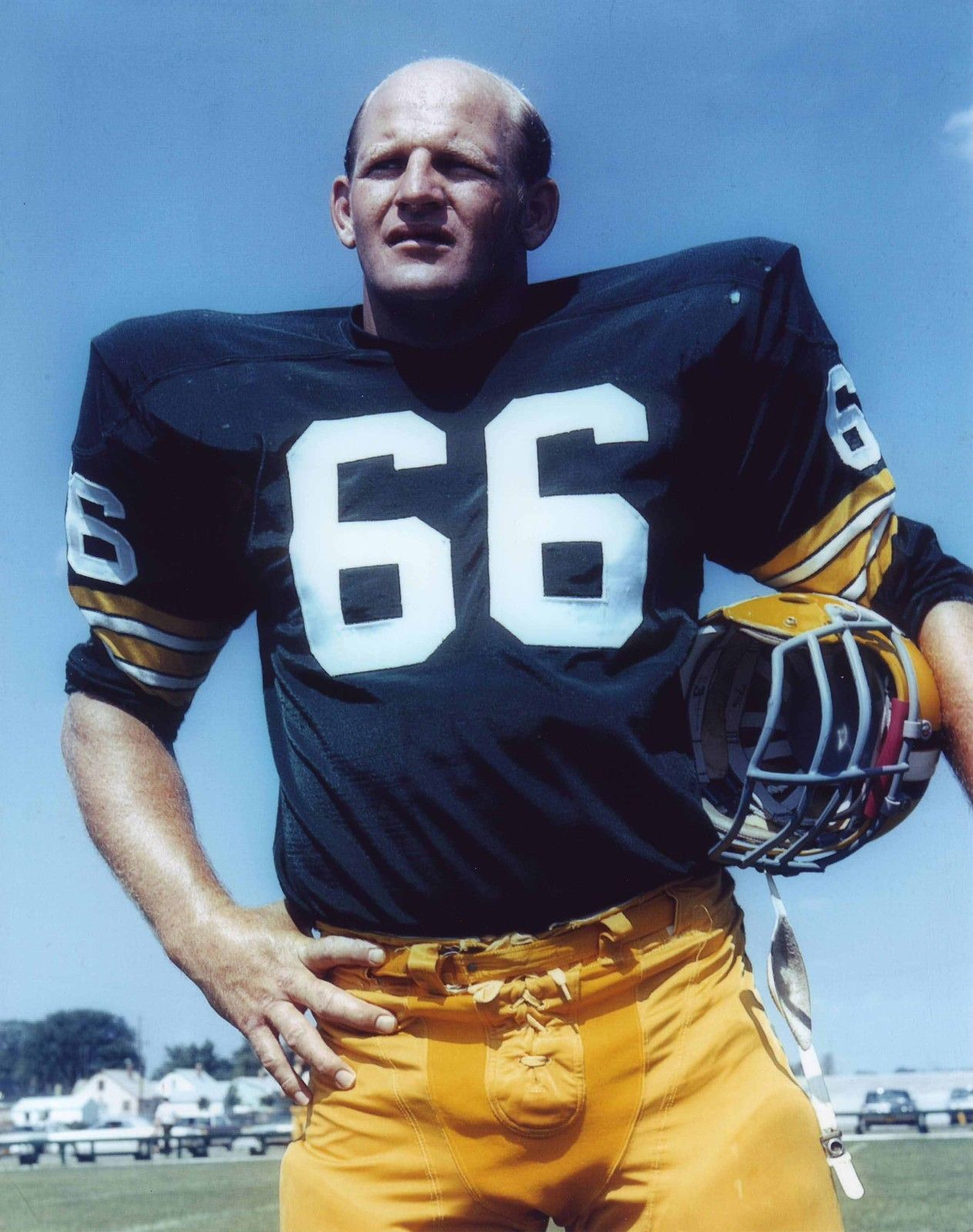
1998 inductee Ray Nitschke

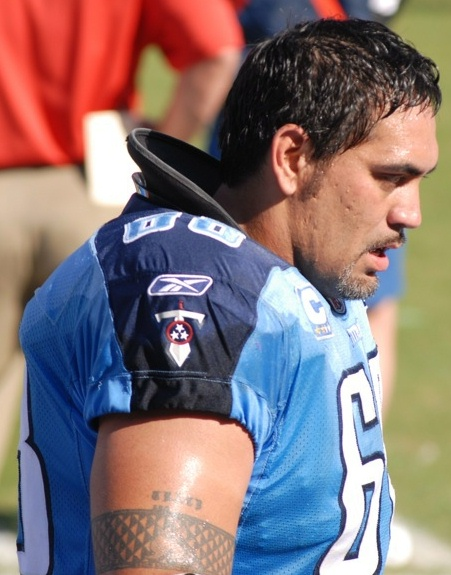
2008 inductee Kevin Mawae

Established in 1987, the Senior Bowl Hall of Fame seeks to pay tribute to the many outstanding former Senior Bowl players who have made lasting contributions to the game of football. The Senior Bowl Hall of Fame also allows enshrinement to former coaches, administrators and other individuals whose efforts helped the Senior Bowl.

- 1988 – Joe Greene, Lee Roy Jordan, Steve Largent, Joe Namath, Walter Payton, Pat Sullivan, Jim Taylor, Travis Tidwell
- 1989 – Ed Jones, Ozzie Newsome, John Stallworth, Gene Upshaw, Jack Youngblood
- 1990 – Paul Brown, Tucker Frederickson, Jerry Kramer, Neil Lomax, Wellington Mara, Finley McRae, Jack Pardee, Rea Scheussler
- 1991 – Morten Andersen, James Brooks, Dave Butz, Weeb Ewbank, Doug Williams
- 1992 – Franco Harris, Mike Holovak, Sam Huff, Dan Marino, Don Shula, Pat Swilling
- 1993 – Cornelius Bennett, Bear Bryant, Ralph Jordan, Tom Landry, Marty Schottenheimer, Lynn Swann
- 1994 – Robert Brazile, Rickey Jackson, Mark Rypien, Jim Simpson
- 1995 – Bob Baumhower, Pat Dye, Bo Jackson, Gene Washington
- 1996 – James Lofton, Dick Steinberg, Kellen Winslow
- 1997 – Bob Hayes, Sterling Sharpe, Doak Walker
- 1998 – Jim McMahon, Ray Nitschke, Thurman Thomas
- 1999 – Tom Banks, Dale Carter, Paul Krause, Albert Lewis, Randall McDaniel, Art Monk, E. B. Peebles, Jr., Derrick Thomas, Roger Wehrli
- 2000 – Hanford Dixon, Brett Favre, Chuck Howley
- 2001 – William Andrews, Ron Jaworski, Eddie Robinson
- 2002 – Todd Christensen, Bert Jones, Steve McNair
- 2003 – Terry Beasley, Jeremiah Castille, Ted Hendricks
- 2004 – Derrick Brooks, Christian Okoye, Richard Todd
- 2005 – Larry Allen, Al Del Greco, Ray Perkins
- 2006 – Curtis Martin, Tony Nathan, Michael Strahan
- 2007 – E. J. Junior, Jake Plummer, Hines Ward
- 2008 – Dean Kleinschmidt, Kevin Mawae, Brian Urlacher
- 2009 – Jason Taylor, Shaun Alexander
- 2010 – Larry Johnson, Terrell Owens
- 2011 – None, due to NFL lockout
- 2012 – Keith Brooking, Donovan McNabb, Dan Reeves
- 2013 – John Abraham, Sylvester Croom, Aeneas Williams
- 2014 – Bill Kollar, Torry Holt, DeMarcus Ware
- 2015 – Woodrow Lowe, Tony Richardson, Kyle Williams
- 2016 – Steve Hutchinson, Bill Curry, Tamba Hali
- 2017 – Blaine Bishop, Lance Briggs, Jim Harbaugh
- 2018 – Al Wilson, Phil Villapiano, Jay Novacek
- 2019 – Rodney Hudson, DeMarco McNeil, Billy Neighbors
- 2020 – None, due to COVID-19 pandemic
- 2021 – Cameron Jordan, Joe Staley, Patrick Surtain, Fred Taylor, Reggie Wayne
- 2022 – Kevin Faulk, Von Miller, Dak Prescott, Philip Rivers, Patrick Willis
- 2023 – Chris Johnson, Lane Johnson, Clay Matthews III, Brian Westbrook, Marshal Yanda

== See also ==
- Cactus Bowl (Division II)
- List of college bowl games
