= 2007 Senior Bowl =

2007 Under Armour Senior Bowl
- 58th Senior Bowl
North Team	South Team
27	0
Head coach: Jon Gruden (Tampa Bay Buccaneers)	Head coach: Mike Nolan (San Francisco 49ers)
	1	2	3	4	Total
North	10	10	7	0	27
South	0	0	0	0	0
- Date: January 27, 2007
- Season: 2006
- Stadium: Ladd–Peebles Stadium
- Location: Mobile, Alabama
- MVP: Tony Hunt (RB, Penn State)
- Attendance: 40,646

United States TV coverage
- Network: NFL Network
- Announcers: Pat Summerall, Brian Baldinger, Jeanne Zelasko, Krista Voda

The 2007 Senior Bowl was a college football exhibition game featuring players from the 2006 college football season and prospects in the 2007 NFL draft. The 58th edition of the Senior Bowl was played on January 27, 2007, at Ladd–Peebles Stadium in Mobile, Alabama. Clothing company Under Armour sponsored the event for the first year, and provided apparel for the game. Coverage of the event was in high-definition on the NFL Network. The North team won, 27–0.

== Game summary ==
2007 Under Armour Senior Bowl

Quarter	1	2	3	4	Total
North	10	10	7	0	27
South	0	0	0	0	0

at Ladd–Peebles Stadium • Mobile, Alabama

- Date: Saturday, January 27, 2007
- Game time: 4:00 p.m. EST (3:00 p.m. CST)
- Game attendance: 40,646
- TV: NFL Network

Game information

First Quarter

- (11:24) NORTH – Tony Hunt (Penn State) 11-yard run, Mason Crosby (Colorado) kick good; NORTH 7–0
- (4:24) NORTH – Crosby 38-yard field goal; NORTH 10–0

Second Quarter

- (10:15) NORTH – Aundrae Allison (East Carolina) 7-yard pass from Drew Stanton (Michigan State), Crosby kick good; NORTH 17–0
- (0:37) NORTH – Crosby 21-yard field goal; NORTH 20–0

Third Quarter

- (6:43) NORTH – Jason Hill (Washington State) 7-yard pass from Troy Smith (Ohio State), Crosby kick good; NORTH 27–0

Fourth Quarter
no scoring
