= Jordan Norwood =

Filipino-American football player (born 1986)

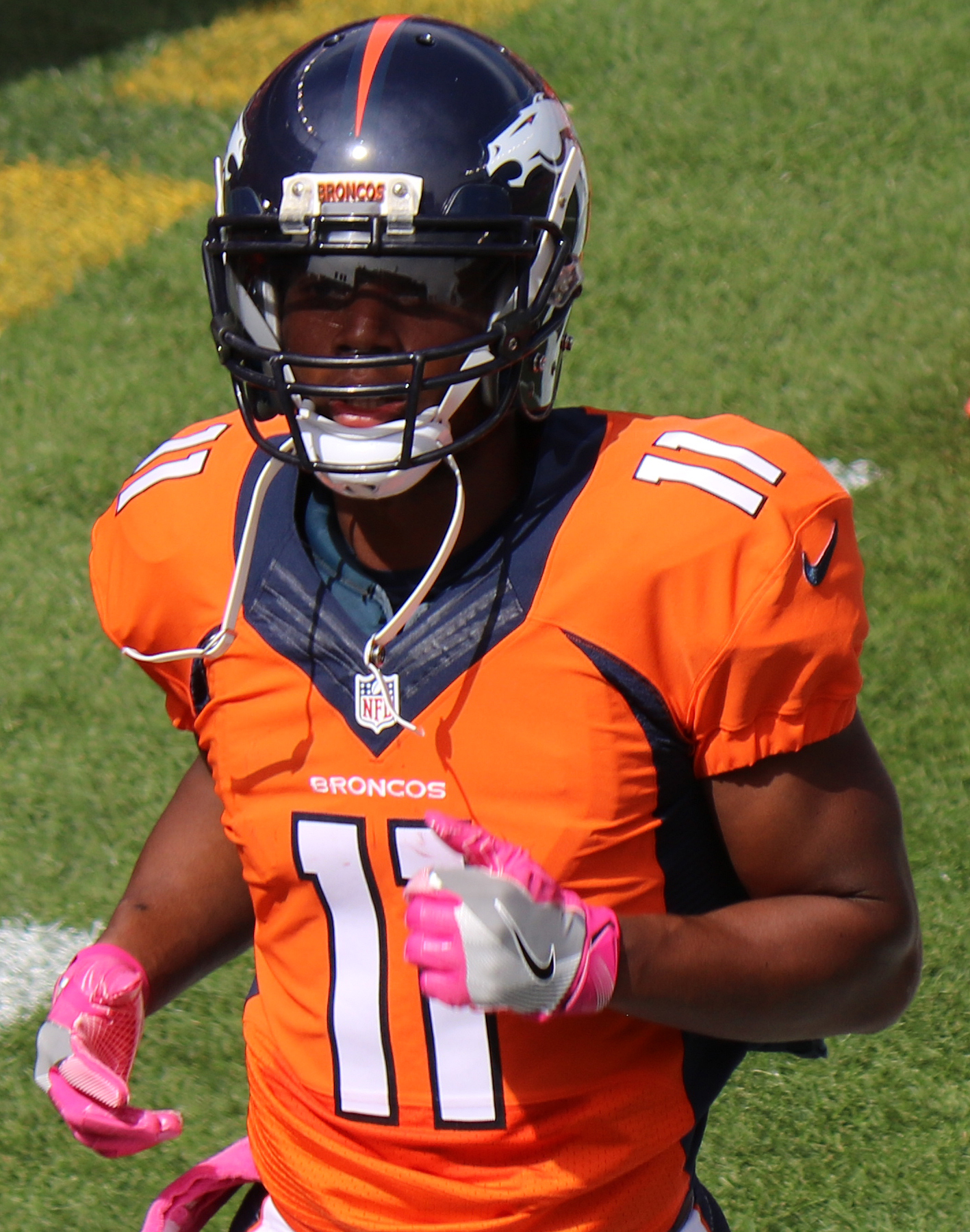
- Norwood with the Denver Broncos in 2016

No. 11, 10, 84
- Positions: Wide receiver, return specialist

Personal information
- Born: September 29, 1986 (age 40); Honolulu, Hawaii, U.S.
- Listed height: 5 ft 11 in (1.80 m)
- Listed weight: 180 lb (82 kg)

Career information
- High school: State College Area (State College, Pennsylvania)
- College: Penn State
- NFL draft: 2009: undrafted

Career history
- Cleveland Browns (2009)*; Philadelphia Eagles (2009); Cleveland Browns (2010–2012); Tampa Bay Buccaneers (2013)*; Denver Broncos (2014–2016)
- * Offseason or practice squad member only

Awards and highlights
- Super Bowl champion (50)

Career NFL statistics
- Receptions: 79
- Receiving yards: 844
- Receiving touchdowns: 2
- Return yards: 384
- Stats at Pro Football Reference

Jordan Shea Rashad Norwood (born September 29, 1986) is an American former professional football player who was a wide receiver and punt returner for eight seasons in the National Football League (NFL). After playing college football for the Penn State Nittany Lions, he was signed by the Cleveland Browns as an undrafted free agent in 2009. Norwood also became a member of the Philadelphia Eagles, Tampa Bay Buccaneers, and Denver Broncos throughout his career. During Super Bowl 50, Norwood set a then-Super Bowl record with a 61-yard punt return—the longest in Super Bowl history at the time—which stood until Kadarius Toney's 65-yard punt return during Super Bowl LVII.

Norwood is the son of Brian Norwood, the current assistant coach for safeties at Texas Christian University (TCU), and younger brother of Gabe Norwood, a professional basketball player for the Rain or Shine Elasto Painters of the Philippine Basketball Association (PBA).

== College career ==
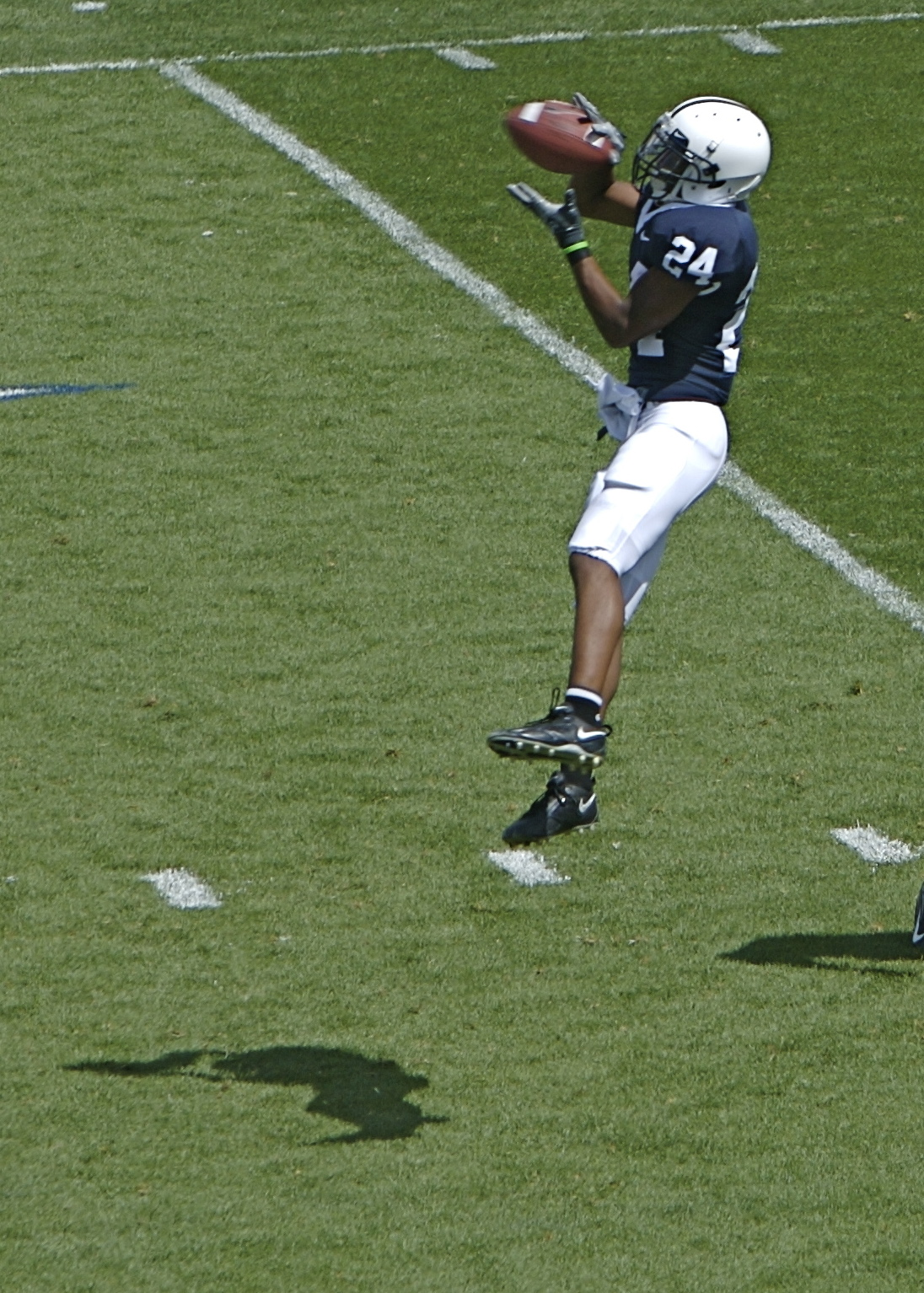
Jordan Norwood during his tenure at Penn State.

Norwood was lightly recruited out of State College Area High School. He received few scholarship offers and accepted Penn State's last minute offer over an offer from Bucknell to play football and basketball. His leadership and jumping skills on the basketball court was what led coach Joe Paterno to offer him a football scholarship.

In 2005, his freshman season, Norwood caught 32 passes for 422 yards with a 13.2 yard average.

Norwood's sophomore season concluded with him making the Dean's List and being named to the Academic All-Big Ten team. He caught 45 passes for 472 yards and two touchdowns with a 10.5 yard average. He joined the basketball team under Ed DeChellis in January, practicing regularly and appearing in four games as a reserve guard in his only season playing basketball.

In his junior season, Jordan caught 40 balls for 484 yards and five touchdowns with a 12.1 yard average including catching a touchdown pass lying down on the ground versus Buffalo. He had a season high eight catches for 65 yards and a touchdown in a 36–31 win over Indiana.

Norwood earned all-Big Ten honorable mention honors as a senior, after catching 41 passes for 637 yards and six touchdowns. Norwood's eight-catch, 116-yard performance versus Oregon State on September 6, 2008, moved him past O. J. McDuffie into third place on Penn State's career reception list. Afterward, he was congratulated in person by McDuffie, who attended the game. Norwood had a second consecutive 100 plus yard game on September 13, 2008, against the Syracuse Orange. He had five receptions for 113 yards and two touchdowns. Before the game against Illinois, Norwood injured his hamstring and didn't participate in the games against the Illini and the Boilermakers.

== Professional career ==
=== Pre-draft ===
Norwood was invited to the 2009 NFL Scouting Combine where he measured a 38-inch vertical jump (sixth among wide receivers at the combine), ran 6.80 in the 3 cone drill (ninth among wide receivers at the combine), and 4.20 in the 20-yard shuttle (ninth among wide receivers at the combine).

Pre-draft measurables
Height	Weight	40-yard dash	20-yard shuttle	Three-cone drill	Vertical jump	Broad jump
5 ft 11 in (1.80 m)	179 lb (81 kg)	4.58 s	4.20 s	6.80 s	38 in (0.97 m)	9 ft 11 in (3.02 m)
All values from NFL Combine.

=== Cleveland Browns (first stint) ===
After being undrafted in the 2009 NFL draft, Norwood signed with the Cleveland Browns as an undrafted free agent on May 1, 2009. He was waived by the Browns during final roster cuts on September 5, 2009.

=== Philadelphia Eagles ===
On September 23, 2009, Norwood was signed to the Philadelphia Eagles practice squad. He was promoted to the active roster on December 1, 2009. He was waived on December 7. On December 9, he was re-signed to their practice squad. He was re-signed to a three-year contract on January 11, 2010. On March 18, Norwood changed his number from 84 to 19 after Hank Baskett was re-signed by the Eagles and took number 84 back. Norwood was waived on September 4.

=== Cleveland Browns (second stint) ===
Norwood was signed to the Browns' practice squad on September 6, 2010. He was promoted to the active roster before Week 13 of the 2010 season. In the 2011 season, he appeared in 14 games and started four. He had 23 receptions for 268 receiving yards and one touchdown, which came in Week 12 against the Cincinnati Bengals. In the 2012 season, he appeared in two games and had 13 receptions for 137 receiving yards. He was waived on August 25, 2013.

=== Tampa Bay Buccaneers ===
On August 28, 2013, Norwood signed with the Buccaneers. On August 31, 2013, he was cut by the Buccaneers.

=== Denver Broncos ===
Norwood signed with the Denver Broncos during the 2014 offseason. The Broncos placed Norwood on injured reserve on August 25, 2014, after he tore his ACL. In the 2015 regular season, he finished with 22 receptions for 207 receiving yards in 11 games and five starts. On February 7, 2016, Norwood was part of the Broncos team that won Super Bowl 50. In the game, the Broncos defeated the Carolina Panthers by a score of 24–10. In the game, Norwood set a Super Bowl record at the time for the longest punt return at 61 yards, which has since been broken by Kadarius Toney who had a 65-yard punt return seven years later in Super Bowl LVII. The return set up a field goal that put the Broncos up 13–7.

On March 23, 2016, Norwood signed a one-year contract with the Denver Broncos after drawing interest from the New York Jets and Detroit Lions. In the 2016 season, Norwood finished with 21 receptions for 232 receiving yards and one receiving touchdown.

=== Retirement ===
On September 10, 2017, Norwood announced his retirement from the NFL.

== Personal life ==
Norwood is of quarter-Filipino descent through his mother, who is half-Black and half-Filipino, and of African American descent through his father. He was born the second-oldest of five children to Tiffiney and Brian Norwood, the assistant coach for safeties at Texas Christian University (TCU). He has four siblings: an older brother, Gabriel; two younger brothers, Levi and Zaccariah; and a younger sister, Brianna. Gabe Norwood is a professional basketball player who played college basketball for the George Mason Patriots and was part of the team that advanced to the 2006 NCAA Final Four. He played his whole professional career for the Rain or Shine Elasto Painters of the Philippine Basketball Association (PBA) and has represented the Philippines in international competitions as a member of Gilas Pilipinas. Levi Norwood was a multi-sport student-athlete at Baylor University, playing on the college football team throughout his college career (2010–2014) and playing one season (2010–11) on the college basketball team.

Norwood earned a Bachelor of Arts in Advertising/Public Relations from Penn State in 2008.

Norwood was married on June 20, 2015. He and his wife had their first child, a girl, on November 4, 2015.
