= Scott Paxson =

American football player (born 1983)

No. 69, 71
- Position: Defensive tackle

Personal information
- Born: February 3, 1983 (age 43); Philadelphia, Pennsylvania, U.S.
- Listed height: 6 ft 4 in (1.93 m)
- Listed weight: 292 lb (132 kg)

Career information
- High school: Roman Catholic (Philadelphia)
- College: Penn State
- NFL draft: 2006: undrafted

Career history
- Pittsburgh Steelers (2006)*; Green Bay Packers (2006)*; Pittsburgh Steelers (2006–2010); Cleveland Browns (2011); Montreal Alouettes (2013–2014)
- * Offseason or practice squad member only

Awards and highlights
- Super Bowl champion (XLIII); First-team All-Big Ten (2005)

Career NFL statistics
- Total tackles: 21
- Sacks: 1
- Fumble recoveries: 1
- Stats at Pro Football Reference

Scott M. Paxson (born February 3, 1983) is an American former professional football player who was a defensive tackle in the National Football League (NFL) and Canadian Football League (CFL). He was signed by the Pittsburgh Steelers as an undrafted free agent in 2006. He won Super Bowl XLIII with the Steelers. He played college football for the Penn State Nittany Lions. Paxson was also a member of the Green Bay Packers, Cleveland Browns and Montreal Alouettes.

== Early life ==
Paxson attended Roman Catholic High School in Philadelphia, Pennsylvania.

== College career ==
Paxson was named All-Big Ten Conference following his senior season at Penn State University. He majored in crime, law and justice.

== Professional career ==
=== Pittsburgh Steelers (first stint) ===
Paxson signed as an undrafted free agent with the Pittsburgh Steelers shortly after the 2006 NFL draft, but was released during the preseason.

=== Green Bay Packers ===
Paxson spent several weeks with the Green Bay Packers during the 2006 regular season.

=== Pittsburgh Steelers (second stint) ===
Paxson signed a future contract with the Steelers on January 8, 2007. He spent the 2007 season as a member of the Steelers' practice squad and renewed his contract on January 15, 2008.

On October 4, 2008, Paxson was promoted to the Steelers' active roster and made his first regular season NFL appearance that week versus Jacksonville. He was waived on October 18 when the team promoted offensive tackle Jeremy Parquet to the active roster. He was re-signed to the practice squad on October 21, and promoted to the active roster again on December 1.

He was waived on September 4, 2009.

Paxson was re-signed to a future contract on January 7, 2010.

Paxson was again released on September 3, 2010, to make room for the mandatory 53-man roster.

=== Cleveland Browns ===
On January 8, 2011, it was announced that Paxson had signed with the Cleveland Browns on a future/reserve contract.

Paxson played in all 16 games with the Cleveland Browns in 2011, recording 21 tackles (10 solo, 11 assists and 1 sack).

In 2012, Paxson was injured during a pre-season game and missed the entire year.

=== Montreal Alouettes ===
Paxson signed with the Montreal Alouetteson June 10, 2013.

He was released on June 21, but re-signed with the Alouettes on August 2.

== Personal ==
Scott Paxson has Type I diabetes.
