= Brian Norwood =

American football player and coach (born 1965)

Current position
- Title: Defensive Passing Game Coordinator/Cornerbacks Coach
- Team: San Jose State
- Conference: MW

Biographical details
- Born: August 12, 1965 (age 61); Portsmouth, Virginia

Playing career
- 1984–1988: Hawaii
- 1989: Calgary Stampeders
- Position: Defensive back

Coaching career (HC unless noted)
- 1990–1991: Arizona (GA)
- 1992–1994: Richmond (OLB)
- 1995–1999: Navy (DB)
- 2000: Texas Tech (DB)
- 2001–2007: Penn State (S)
- 2008–2010: Baylor (DC)
- 2011–2014: Baylor (AHC/S)
- 2015–2017: Tulsa (AHC/Co-DC/S)
- 2018: Kansas State (Co-DC/DB)
- 2019: Navy (Co-DC/S)
- 2020–2024: UCLA (AHC/PGC/DB)
- 2025: TCU (S)
- 2026–present: San Jose State (PGC/CB)

Brian Norwood (born August 12, 1965) is an American football coach.

== Career ==
Norwood currently serves as defensive passing game coordinator and cornerbacks coach at San Jose State. He was formerly the co-defensive coordinator and safeties coach with Navy Midshipmen football. He also served as co-defensive coordinator and safeties coach with Bill Snyder at Kansas State Wildcats football and Philip Montgomery at Tulsa Golden Hurricane football. This was after holding the position of assistant head coach to Art Briles at Baylor University. Both Norwood and Briles served as assistants to Mike Leach at Texas Tech in 2000. Norwood was also an assistant to Joe Paterno at Penn State from 2001 to 2007.

== Early life and education ==
Norwood grew up in Prince George's County, Maryland, where he attended Georgetown University basketball camps and met then-coach John Thompson.

As Norwood's father served in the Air Force, the family moved to Hawaii in Norwood's sophomore year of high school. Norwood played cornerback and safety at the University of Hawaii, and graduated with a bachelor's degree in communication in 1988.

In high school and college, he was best friends with Ken Niumatalolo, now the head coach who hired him at Navy. After college, Norwood worked for United Airlines for a year before playing football the Canadian Football League with the Calgary Stampeders.

His football playing career came to an end when he was diagnosed with diabetes.

== Family ==
Norwood and his wife, Tiffiney, met and started dating in high school in Hawaii. They have five children: Gabe, Jordan, Levi, Brianna, and Zac.

Norwood's son Gabe was a member of the George Mason Patriots men's basketball team that advanced to the 2006 NCAA Final Four. He played his whole professional career for the Rain or Shine Elasto Painters in the Philippine Basketball Association, and is a former member of the Philippine national basketball team.

Norwood's second son, Jordan, played wide receiver at Penn State and was a wide receiver for the Denver Broncos.

His third son, Levi, was a receiver for Baylor University.

His only daughter, Brianna, attended George Mason University, where she studied sports management and was on the dance team. She worked for the Washington Nationals during the 2012, 2013, and 2014 seasons, meeting Nationals center fielder Michael A. Taylor, now her fiancé.

Norwood's youngest son, Zac, played basketball for Midway High School in Waco, Texas.
