= Alan Zemaitis =

American football player (born 1982)

No. 29
- Position: Cornerback

Personal information
- Born: August 24, 1982 (age 44); Rochester, New York, U.S.
- Listed height: 6 ft 1 in (1.85 m)
- Listed weight: 193 lb (88 kg)

Career information
- College: Penn State
- NFL draft: 2006: 4 / Pick 122nd round

Career history
- 2006: Tampa Bay Buccaneers
- 2008: Hamilton Tiger-Cats

Awards and highlights
- Second-team All-American (2005); First-team All-Big Ten (2005); 2× Second-team All-Big Ten (2003, 2004)

Alan Zemaitis (born August 24, 1982) is an American former professional football player who was a cornerback for the Tampa Bay Buccaneers of the National Football League (NFL). He played college football for the Penn State Nittany Lions and was selected 122nd overall by the Buccaneers in the fourth round of the 2006 NFL draft. He also played in the Canadian Football League (CFL) for the Hamilton Tiger-Cats.

Pre-draft measurables
Height	Weight	Arm length	Hand span	40-yard dash	20-yard shuttle	Three-cone drill	Vertical jump	Broad jump	Bench press
6 ft 1 1/4 in (1.86 m)	194 lb (88 kg)	31 1/8 in (0.79 m)	9 1/4 in (0.23 m)	4.57 s	4.18 s	6.68 s	30.0 in (0.76 m)	9 ft 9 in (2.97 m)	10 reps
All values from NFL Combine/Pro Day

== Early life ==
At Penn State University, Zemaitis, a tri-captain, was a three-time All-Big Ten cornerback and was second-team All-American in 2005. For two straight seasons he was a semifinalist for the Jim Thorpe Award, given to the nation's top defensive back. Zemaitis helped lead Penn State to an 11–1 record and a Big Ten championship in 2005. His three interceptions in the season finale at Michigan State helped seal a 31–22 victory that gave the Nittany Lions the title.

Despite a violent car accident in January 2003 that left him with several head wounds, Zemaitis played in every Penn State game over his four years and started 34 of his last 35. He finished his career with 181 tackles, and broke the Big Ten and Penn State single-season records with 207 interception return yards in 2003.
