= Travis Tidwell =

American football player and coach (1929–2004)

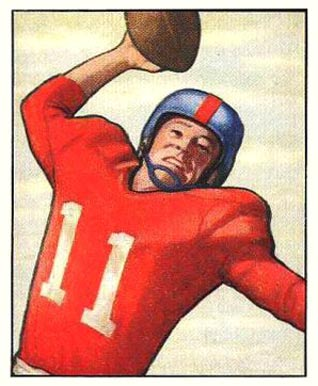

No. 20
- Position: Quarterback

Personal information
- Born: February 5, 1925; Florence, Alabama, U.S.
- Died: July 1, 2004 (aged 79); Trussville, Alabama, U.S.
- Listed height: 5 ft 10 in (1.78 m)
- Listed weight: 185 lb (84 kg)

Career information
- High school: Woodlawn (Birmingham, Alabama)
- College: Auburn
- NFL draft: 1950: 1st round, 7th overall pick

Career history
- New York Giants (1950–1951)

Awards and highlights
- SEC Player of the Year (1949); First-team All-SEC (1949); Second-team All-SEC (1946)

Career NFL statistics
- Passing attempts: 76
- Passing completions: 33
- Completion percentage: 43.4%
- TD–INT: 5–7
- Passing yards: 493
- Passer rating: 48.8
- Stats at Pro Football Reference

Travis Vaughn Tidwell (February 5, 1929 – July 1, 2004) was an American football player and coach. Tidwell played high school football for Woodlawn High School. He played college football at Auburn University and then in the National Football League (NFL) with the New York Giants. He was MVP of the 1950 Senior Bowl. Tidwell led Auburn in defeating Alabama in 1949. Zipp Newman wrote "There has never been a sweeter Auburn victory in all the 58 years of football on the Plains than the Tigers 14–13 win over Alabama." Tidwell stood 5 feet 10 inches (1.78 m) tall and weighed 185 pounds (84 kg).

== See also ==
- List of NCAA major college football yearly total offense leaders
