= Jeremy Kapinos =

American football player (born 1984)

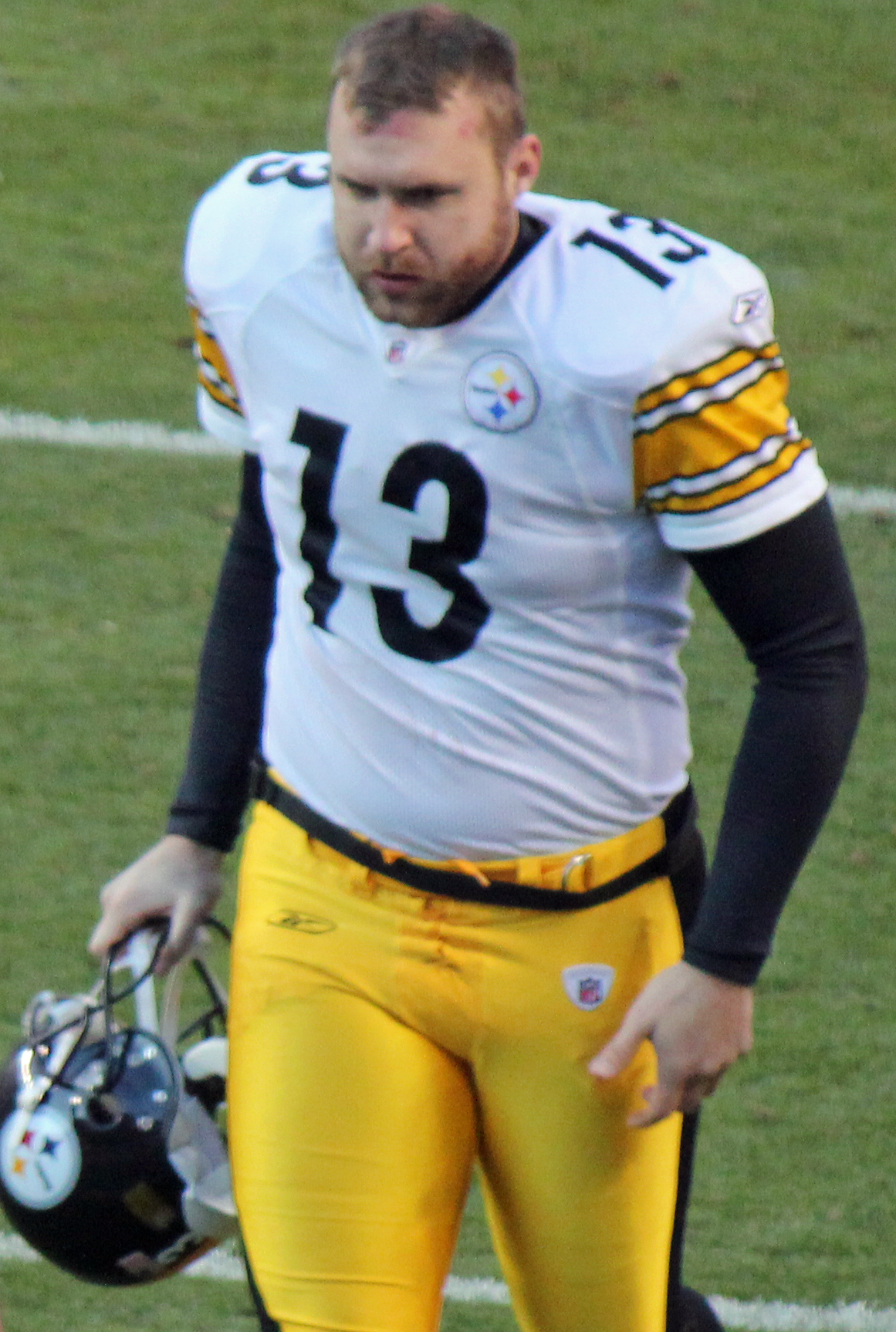
- Kapinos with the Pittsburgh Steelers in 2012

No. 3, 7, 13
- Position: Punter

Personal information
- Born: August 23, 1984 (age 42); West Point, New York, U.S.
- Listed height: 6 ft 1 in (1.85 m)
- Listed weight: 233 lb (106 kg)

Career information
- High school: Springfield (VA) West
- College: Penn State
- NFL draft: 2007: undrafted

Career history
- New York Jets (2007); Green Bay Packers (2008–2009); Indianapolis Colts (2010); Pittsburgh Steelers (2010–2012)

Awards and highlights
- PFWA All-Rookie Team (2007); Third-team All-American (2006); Second-team All-Big Ten (2006)

Career NFL statistics
- Punts: 140
- Punting yard average: 43.2
- Net punting average: 35.4
- Stats at Pro Football Reference

Jeremy D. Kapinos (born August 23, 1984) is an American former professional football player who was a punter in the National Football League (NFL). He played college football for the Penn State Nittany Lions before being signed by the New York Jets as an undrafted free agent in 2007.

Kapinos also played for the Green Bay Packers, Indianapolis Colts, and Pittsburgh Steelers.

== Early life ==
Born an Army brat, Kapinos moved from city to city before his family settled in Springfield, Virginia. He was named All-Met while at West Springfield High School (Virginia), in Springfield, Virginia, where his coach was former Green Bay Packers punter Bill Renner.

== College career ==
Kapinos was a Ray Guy Award finalist and a third-team All-American selection by the Associated Press while playing college football at Penn State University. He is the Nittany Lions' all-time leader in punting yardage.

== Professional career ==
=== New York Jets ===
Kapinos signed as an undrafted free agent with the New York Jets following the 2007 NFL draft on July 2 but was released during the preseason on August 2. On November 27, Kapinos was re-signed to the Jets' practice squad. He was promoted to the active roster on December 22 when wide receiver Laveranues Coles was placed on injured reserve. He saw his first regular season action that week against the Titans, punting five times for 208 yards, including two punts inside the 20. Kapinos was then placed on the inactive list for the last game of the season.

After a well-publicized 2008 offseason competition with Ben Graham, the Jets released him on June 10, 2008.

=== Green Bay Packers ===
Kapinos signed a two-year deal with the Green Bay Packers on December 3, 2008, to replace released punter Derrick Frost. He averaged 34.5 yards on 8 punts, with 3 inside the 20, in the Packers' week 14 loss to Houston.

Kapinos won the preseason competition with Durant Brooks to become the Packers' regular season punter for the 2009 NFL season after leading the NFL in preseason in net punting yardage. Kapinos was also pressed into service Week 17 as the Packers' holder following a string of bad kicks by placekicker Mason Crosby in previous games.

According to the Green Bay Packers website, Kapinos did not receive a qualifying offer to retain his position as their starting punter for the 2010 NFL season.

In late September 2010, the Carolina Panthers brought Kapinos in to mimic the left-footed punters they would face in the coming weeks: Tampa Bay's Chris Bryan, Cincinnati's Kevin Huber, and Arizona's Ben Graham.

=== Indianapolis Colts ===
On October 25, 2010, the Indianapolis Colts signed Kapinos to replace the team's regular punter, Pat McAfee, who was serving a one-game suspension for his October 20 arrest for public intoxication. Kapinos was waived on November 3 after McAfee was reinstated.

=== Pittsburgh Steelers ===
On December 7, 2010, he was signed by the Steelers to replace the injured Daniel Sepulveda, who tore the ACL in his non-kicking leg. Kapinos was going to wear the number 3, which had been worn earlier in the season by longtime kicker Jeff Reed prior to his release, but eventually decided to wear number 13 instead, being the first Steeler to don that number since quarterback Bill Mackrides wore it last in 1954. Kapinos punted in Super Bowl XLV as a Steeler, setting a Super Bowl record for average punting yardage (3 for 51 avg). The Steelers lost the Super Bowl to the Green Bay Packers by a score of 31–25. He was released at the end of the 2011 preseason after a position battle with a once-again healthy Sepulveda.

Kapinos re-joined the Steelers prior to Week 9 of the 2011 NFL season after Sepulveda was placed on injured reserve for the season.

The team signed him to a one-year contract that offseason, offering Kapinos an exclusive rights free agent tender on February 22, 2012. He signed the tender on April 16, 2012. Kapinos was waived/injured during final cuts on August 31, 2012, after being unable to punt due to an injury.

== Personal life ==
Kapinos earned a Bachelor of Science in Recreation, Park and Tourism Management from Penn State in 2006. He is an Eagle Scout. Kapinos' father David, a retired United States Army Colonel, played football at Army.

Although his surname sounds Greek, Kapinos is actually of Polish descent—although he does admit a penchant for Greek cuisine.

Kapinos joined Packers placekicker Mason Crosby and long snapper Brett Goode to kick footballs into the stands during the pre-race "kick off" of the 2009 A.J. Foyt 225 IRL race at the Milwaukee Mile on May 31, 2009.
