= Matthew Rice =

American football player (born 1982)

No. 69
- Position: Defensive end

Personal information
- Born: February 12, 1982 (age 44)
- Listed height: 6 ft 4 in (1.93 m)
- Listed weight: 256 lb (116 kg)

Career information
- College: Penn State
- NFL draft: 2006: undrafted

Career history
- Buffalo Bills (2006)*; St. Louis Rams (2006)*; New York Giants (2006)*; Detroit Lions (2006–2007)*; Rhein Fire (2007)
- * Offseason or practice squad member only

Awards and highlights
- Second-team All-Big Ten (2005)

Matthew Nathaniel Rice (born February 12, 1982) is an American former football defensive end. He played collegiately at Penn State University and attended Eleanor Roosevelt High School in Greenbelt, Maryland.

== Football career ==
Rice signed as a free agent with the Buffalo Bills shortly after the 2006 NFL draft. He was released from the team June 9, 2006, and signed with the St. Louis Rams 2 weeks later, only to be released despite a productive preseason. He worked out for several teams during the 2006 season, and was eventually signed mid-season by the New York Giants. The start of the 2007 preseason found Rice with the Detroit Lions organization, allocated to the Rhein Fire of NFL Europa.

The 6'4", 256-pound Rice was a three-year starter and a second-team All-Big Ten selection at Penn State. He helped the Nittany Lions rank as the conference's top defense in 2005, and made 9 sacks and 147 tackles. He was chosen to play in the 2006 Hula Bowl. An accomplished painter and illustrator, Rice earned dual degrees from Penn State University in 2005: a Bachelor of Arts in integrative arts, along with a Bachelor of Arts in African-American studies.

== Personal life ==
Between workouts as out as a possible 2006 mid-season replacement for the Kansas City Chiefs, Jacksonville Jaguars, and New York Giants, Rice concentrated on establishing a new business, Mateo Blu. The company publishes limited-edition art prints with proceeds going to charitable causes.

Rice began having seizures in August 2007. CAT scans and MRIs identified a tumor on the right frontal lobe of his brain—ironically, the section from which artistic abilities are derived. The tumor was determined to be benign, but surgery became necessary following a second seizure.

The surgery, performed at Johns Hopkins University, was successful. The tumor was limited to the surface of the brain, and was removed without damage to Rice's brain. Afterward, Rice was told, instead of a potential loss of his artistic talents, the removal of the tumor might actually allow his talents to develop more fully. During the surgery, reinforcements were placed in Rice's skull, allowing for the possibility of playing football again.

Rice died from brain cancer in March 2023. https://www.collegian.psu.edu/football/former-penn-state-football-defensive-end-matthew-rice-dies-at-41/article_4901ebc6-c4ef-11ed-be99-5f9d65bc8c73.html
