= Tony Hunt (American football) =

American football player (born 1985)

No. 29
- Position: Running back

Personal information
- Born: November 24, 1985 (age 40); San Antonio, Texas, U.S.
- Listed height: 6 ft 2 in (1.88 m)
- Listed weight: 233 lb (106 kg)

Career information
- High school: T. C. Williams (Alexandria, Virginia)
- College: Penn State
- NFL draft: 2007: 3rd round, 90th overall pick

Career history
- Philadelphia Eagles (2007–2008); Raiffeisen Vikings Vienna (2011)

Awards and highlights
- 2× Second-team All-Big Ten (2005, 2006); 2007 Senior Bowl MVP; 2007 Outback Bowl MVP

Career NFL statistics
- Rushing attempts: 14
- Rushing yards: 25
- Rushing touchdowns: 2
- Receptions: 6
- Receiving yards: 42
- Stats at Pro Football Reference

Antonio Christopher Hunt (born November 24, 1985) is an American former professional football player who was a running back for two seasons with the Philadelphia Eagles of the National Football League (NFL). Hunt played college football for the Penn State Nittany Lions and was selected by the Eagles in the third round of the 2007 NFL draft. He also played one season in the Austrian Football League (AFL) in Europe.

== Early life ==
A standout player at T. C. Williams High School in Alexandria, Virginia, Hunt rushed for more than 2,000 total yards and also played linebacker, defensive end, and even punted. He was named the Alexandria Sportsman Club Player-of-the-Year in 2002–03. He was also a stalwart on the track and field team, finishing eighth in Virginia in the discus as a junior.

Hunt originally made a verbal commitment to play football at University of Southern California, but instead signed a letter-of-intent with Penn State upon learning of Reggie Bush's commitment to the Trojans.

== College career ==
Hunt finished his Penn State career 2nd all-time in career rushing yards with 3,320 yards and first all-time with 654 carries (5.08 avg.). A Doak Walker Award candidate in 2006, Hunt became only the fifth Nittany Lion to rush for back-to-back 1,000-yard seasons and the fifth to rush for more than 3,000 career yards. He was named Big Ten Conference Offensive Player of the Week after a career-best 167-yard rushing game versus Temple.

Hunt led Penn State in rushing during the 2005 and 2004 seasons, amassing 1,047 and 777 yards respectively, earning the nickname Tony "Big Game" Hunt.

At the outset of his college career, Hunt was overshadowed by fellow running back Austin Scott, who was considered the more promising recruit, having broken many Pennsylvania high school football records. Despite this, Hunt won the starting running back job through his work ethic, and by virtue of being a better pass blocker than Scott.

Hunt was also named the MVP of the 2007 Senior Bowl on January 27, 2007, after leading all running backs in total yards.

Hunt was also named the 2007 Outback Bowl MVP.

== Professional career ==
=== Philadelphia Eagles ===
Hunt was selected by the Philadelphia Eagles, 90th overall, in the 3rd round of the 2007 NFL draft. Critics and fans alike thought the move would finally give Brian Westbrook the short-yardage back he always wanted. In his rookie season, however, Hunt saw limited playing time behind Correll Buckhalter managing just 16 carries and one touchdown. After the Eagles acquired Lorenzo Booker from Miami, he was pushed to fourth on the depth chart ahead of only Ryan Moats. The Eagles had traditionally only kept three. On August 18, 2008, the Eagles official website confirmed Hunt would get reps at fullback after Jed Collins, Jason Davis and Luke Lawton failed to secure the job, and Hunt's impressive preseason game against the Carolina Panthers which he broke a 51-yard run. He was unofficially named the Eagles' starter after the other three full backs were released.

Hunt was released from the Eagles on October 14, 2008. Though credited for his willingness to switch positions as well as make plays on special teams, the team decided to sign the more experienced Kyle Eckel to play full back after Eckel was released by the Patriots a week prior.

=== Raiffeisen Vikings Vienna ===
In March 2011, Hunt was signed by the Raiffeisen Vikings Vienna, an American football team in Austria. He rushed for 413 yards on 88 carries and seven TD's in the 2011 Austrian Football League season.
