= Ethan Kilmer =

American football player (born 1983)

No. 43
- Position: Safety

Personal information
- Born: January 31, 1983 (age 43); Towanda, Pennsylvania, U.S.
- Listed height: 6 ft 0 in (1.83 m)
- Listed weight: 204 lb (93 kg)

Career information
- High school: Wyalusing (PA) Valley
- College: Penn State
- NFL draft: 2006: 7th round, 209th overall pick

Career history
- Cincinnati Bengals (2006–2008); Miami Dolphins (2009)*
- * Offseason or practice squad member only

Career NFL statistics
- Total tackles: 19
- Fumble recoveries: 1
- Pass deflections: 1
- Interceptions: 1
- Defensive touchdowns: 1
- Stats at Pro Football Reference

Ethan Michael Kilmer (born January 31, 1983) is an American former professional football player who was a safety in the National Football League (NFL). He was selected by the Cincinnati Bengals in the seventh round of the 2006 NFL draft. He played college football for the Penn State Nittany Lions.

Kilmer was also a member of the Miami Dolphins prior to the 2009 season before his retirement.

== Early life ==
Kilmer excelled in two sports at Wyalusing Valley Junior/Senior High School in Wyalusing, Pennsylvania; neither of those sports, however, was football. (He excelled at track and basketball.)

== College career ==
=== Shippensburg ===
He enrolled at Shippensburg University in 2001 with the intention of competing in track and field, however Kilmer's eventual decision to study kinesiology made a transfer to Penn State necessary.

=== Penn State ===
At Penn State, Kilmer joined the Nittany Lions football program as a walk-on, eventually working his way into a starting position. His best game came during Penn State's triple overtime win over Florida State in the 2006 Orange Bowl, when he caught six passes for 79 yards and a touchdown. He earned a Bachelor of Science in Kinesiology there in 2006.

== Professional career ==
Pre-draft measurables
Height	Weight	40-yard dash	20-yard shuttle	Three-cone drill	Vertical jump	Broad jump	Bench press
6 ft 0 1/4 in (1.84 m)	204 lb (93 kg)	4.45 s	4.12 s	6.90 s	41.0 in (1.04 m)	10 ft 10 in (3.30 m)	19 reps
All values from Pro Day

=== Cincinnati Bengals ===
Kilmer was selected by the Cincinnati Bengals in the seventh round (209th overall) of the 2006 NFL draft. He was listed as a safety on the Bengals' roster but also spent time learning cornerback and wide receiver. Additionally, Kilmer played a great deal of special teams during the 2006 season. He scored his first NFL touchdown on Week 11 against the New Orleans Saints, intercepting a Drew Brees pass and returning it 52 yards.

Kilmer suffered a thigh injury during the 2008 preseason. He was waived/injured on August 20 and reverted to injured reserve after clearing waivers. He was released with an injury settlement on October 9.

=== Miami Dolphins ===
After spending most of the 2008 season out of football, Kilmer signed with the Miami Dolphins on January 19, 2009. He chose to leave the team on August 7.
