= List of Penn State football players =

The following is a list of Penn State University American football players.

== Current NFL players ==
- Adrian Amos – Green Bay Packers – safety
- Troy Apke – Washington Commanders – safety
- Saquon Barkley – Philadelphia Eagles – running back
- Ryan Bates – Chicago Bears – offensive tackle
- Nick Bowers – Las Vegas Raiders – tight end
- Jaquan Brisker – Chicago Bears – safety
- Cameron Brown – New York Giants – linebacker
- Jason Cabinda – Detroit Lions – fullback
- Dan Chisena – Minnesota Vikings – wide receiver
- Jack Crawford – Tennessee Titans – defensive tackle/end
- Jahan Dotson – Philadelphia Eagles – wide receiver
- Arnold Ebiketie – Atlanta Falcons – outside linebacker
- Sam Ficken – Tennessee Titans – placekicker
- Pat Freiermuth – Pittsburgh Steelers – tight end
- Will Fries – Indianapolis Colts – offensive tackle
- Mike Gesicki – New England Patriots – tight end
- Blake Gillikin – New Orleans Saints – punter
- Kevin Givens – San Francisco 49ers – defensive tackle
- Chris Godwin – Tampa Bay Buccaneers – wide receiver
- Robbie Gould – San Francisco 49ers – placekicker
- Yetur Gross-Matos – Carolina Panthers – defensive end
- Grant Haley – Los Angeles Rams – cornerback
- DaeSean Hamilton – Denver Broncos – wide receiver
- K. J. Hamler – Denver Broncos – wide receiver
- Jesse James – Detroit Lions – tight end
- Austin Johnson – NY Giants – nose tackle
- DaQuan Jones – Buffalo Bills – defensive end
- Jesse Luketa – Arizona Cardinals – outside linebacker
- Michal Menet – Green Bay Packers – center
- Connor McGovern (American football, born 1997) – Buffalo Bills – center
- Shareef Miller – Carolina Panthers – defensive end
- Amani Oruwariye – Detroit Lions – cornerback
- Odafe Oweh – Baltimore Ravens – defensive end
- Micah Parsons – Green Bay Packers – linebacker
- John Reid – Seattle Seahawks – cornerback
- Joey Porter Jr. – Pittsburgh Steelers – cornerback
- Allen Robinson – Pittsburgh Steelers – wide receiver
- Miles Sanders – Carolina Panthers – running back
- Nick Scott – Los Angeles Rams – safety
- Donovan Smith – Kansas City Chiefs – offensive tackle
- Shaka Toney – Washington Commanders – defensive end
- Ross Travis – Cleveland Browns – tight end
- Robert Windsor – Indianapolis Colts – defensive tackle
- Chop Robinson – Miami Dolphins – defensive end

== Current NFL free agents ==
- Mike Hull – linebacker
- Michael Mauti – linebacker, #56
- Nathan Stupar – linebacker
- Cameron Wake – defensive end, #91
- Trevor Williams – cornerback

== Current CFL players ==
- AJ Wallace – Calgary Stampeders – cornerback
- Daryll Clark – Free Agent (cut by Stampeders on May 10, 2011) – quarterback)

== Current USFL players ==
- Christian Campbell – Tampa Bay Bandits – cornerback

== Current Indoor Football League players ==
- Rodney Kinlaw – Omaha Beef – running back

== Current United Football League players ==
- Calvin Lowry – Omaha Nighthawks – safety #37

== Current Arena Football League players ==
- Josh Gaines – Pittsburgh Power – defensive end
- Jerome Hayes – Philadelphia Soul – defensive lineman
- Anthony Morelli – Pittsburgh Power – quarterback
- Tyrell Sales – Jacksonville Sharks – linebacker

== Former NFL players ==
- Anthony Adams – Chicago Bears, San Francisco 49ers – defensive tackle
- Rogers Alexander – New York Jets, New England Patriots – linebacker
- Mike Alexander – Los Angeles Raiders, Buffalo Bills – wide receiver
- Doug Allen – Buffalo Bills – linebacker
- Kurt Allerman – St. Louis Cardinals, Green Bay Packers, Detroit Lions – linebacker
- Richie Anderson – New York Jets, Dallas Cowboys – running back
- Mike Archie – Oilers/Tennessee Titans – running back
- LaVar Arrington – Washington Redskins, New York Giants – linebacker
- Walker Lee Ashley – Minnesota Vikings, Kansas City Chiefs – linebacker
- Chris Bahr – Cincinnati Bengals, Oakland Raiders, San Diego Chargers – placekicker
- Matt Bahr – Pittsburgh Steelers, Cleveland Browns, San Francisco 49ers, New York Giants, New England Patriots, Philadelphia Eagles – placekicker
- Ralph Baker – New York Jets – linebacker
- Bruce Bannon – Miami Dolphins – linebacker
- Stew Barber – Buffalo Bills – offensive guard (AFL)
- Lou Benfatti – New York Jets – defensive tackle
- Brad Benson – New York Giants – offensive lineman
- Tom Bill – Buffalo Bills – quarterback
- Todd Blackledge – Kansas City Chiefs, Pittsburgh Steelers – quarterback
- NaVorro Bowman – San Francisco 49ers – linebacker
- Brett Brackett – Jacksonville Jaguars, Tennessee Titans, Seattle Seahawks – tight end
- Dave Bradley – Green Bay Packers, St. Louis Cardinals, Chicago Fire (WFL) – offensive lineman
- Kyle Brady – New York Jets, Jacksonville Jaguars, New England Patriots – tight end
- Bruce Branch – Washington Redskins – cornerback
- John Bronson – Arizona Cardinals – tight end/fullback
- Courtney Brown – Cleveland Browns, Denver Broncos – defensive end
- Gary Brown – Houston Oilers, San Diego Chargers, New York Giants – tailback
- Levi Brown – Arizona Cardinals, Pittsburgh Steelers – offensive tackle
- Todd Burger – Chicago Bears, New York Jets – offensive guard
- Deon Butler – Seattle Seahawks – wide receiver
- Greg Buttle – New York Jets – linebacker
- Gerald Cadogan – Carolina Panthers, Indianapolis Colts, Calgary Stampeders – offensive lineman
- John Cappelletti – Los Angeles Rams, San Diego Chargers – running back
- Ki-Jana Carter – Cincinnati Bengals, Washington Redskins, New Orleans Saints – tailback
- Jimmy Cefalo – Miami Dolphins – wide receiver
- Bruce Clark – New Orleans Saints, Kansas City Chiefs – defensive lineman
- Duffy Cobbs – New England Patriots – defensive back
- Dan Connor – Carolina Panthers, New York Giants, Dallas Cowboys - linebacker
- Ron Coder – Pittsburgh Steelers, Seattle Seahawks, St. Louis Cardinals, Denver Broncos, Philadelphia Stars (USFL) – offensive lineman
- Kerry Collins – Carolina Panthers, New Orleans Saints, Oakland Raiders, New York Giants, Tennessee Titans, Indianapolis Colts – quarterback
- Andre Collins – Washington Redskins, Cincinnati Bengals, Detroit Lions – linebacker
- Shane Conlan – Buffalo Bills, Los Angeles Rams – linebacker
- Chris Conlin – Miami Dolphins, Indianapolis Colts – offensive lineman
- Bill Contz – Cleveland Browns, New Orleans Saints – offensive lineman
- Brett Conway – Green Bay Packers, New York Jets, Oakland Raiders, Washington Redskins, Cleveland Browns, New York Giants – placekicker
- Ron Crosby – New Orleans Saints, New York Jets, Pittsburgh Maulers (USFL), Philadelphia Stars (USFL) – linebacker
- Randy Crowder – Miami Dolphins, Tampa Bay Buccaneers – defensive lineman
- Chris Devlin – Cincinnati Bengals, Chicago Bears – linebacker
- Mark D'Onofrio – Green Bay Packers – linebacker
- Keith Dorney – Detroit Lions – offensive lineman
- D.J. Dozier – Minnesota Vikings, Detroit Lions – running back
- Troy Drayton – Los Angeles Rams, Miami Dolphins, Kansas City Chiefs, Green Bay Packers – tight end
- Chuck Drazenovich – Washington Redskins – linebacker
- Eddie Drummond – Detroit Lions, Kansas City Chiefs, Pittsburgh Steelers – wide receiver, kick returner
- Roger Duffy – New York Jets, Pittsburgh Steelers – offensive lineman
- Bill Dugan – Seattle Seahawks, Minnesota Vikings, New York Giants – offensive lineman
- Omar Easy – Kansas City Chiefs
- John Ebersole – New York Jets – linebacker
- Bobby Engram – Chicago Bears, Seattle Seahawks, Kansas City Chiefs, Cleveland Browns – wide receiver
- Curtis Enis – Chicago Bears – running back
- Sean Farrell – Tampa Bay Buccaneers, New England Patriots, Denver Broncos, Seattle Seahawks – guard
- Chafie Fields – San Francisco 49ers, Denver Broncos, New York Jets – wide receiver
- Scott Fitzkee – Philadelphia Eagles, San Diego Chargers, Philadelphia Stars (USFL) – wide receiver
- Marlon Forbes – Chicago Bears, Cleveland Browns – defensive back
- Mitch Frerotte – Buffalo Bills, Seattle Seahawks – guard
- Chuck Fusina – Tampa Bay Buccaneers, Green Bay Packers, Philadelphia Stars (USFL) – quarterback
- Gregg Garrity – Pittsburgh Steelers, Philadelphia Eagles – wide receiver
- Sam Gash – Baltimore Ravens, New England Patriots, Buffalo Bills – fullback
- John Gerak – Minnesota Vikings, St. Louis Rams – offensive guard
- Charlie Getty – Kansas City Chiefs, Green Bay Packers – offensive tackle
- Ralph Giacomarro – Atlanta Falcons, Denver Broncos – punter
- Reggie Givens – San Francisco 49ers, Washington Redskins – linebacker
- Keith Goganious – Buffalo Bills, Jacksonville Jaguars, Baltimore Ravens – linebacker
- Dave Graf – Cleveland Browns, Washington Redskins – linebacker
- Don Graham – Tampa Bay Buccaneers, Buffalo Bills, Washington Redskins – linebacker
- Garry Gilliam – Seattle Seahawks, San Francisco 49ers – offensive tackle
- John Gilmore – Tampa Bay Buccaneers – tight end, #88
- Rosey Grier – New York Giants, Los Angeles Rams – defensive lineman
- Mike Guman – Philadelphia Eagles, Green Bay Packers, Seattle Seahawks – running back
- Christian Hackenberg – New York Jets, Memphis Express – quarterback
- Tamba Hali – Kansas City Chiefs – defensive end/linebacker, #91
- Jack Ham – Pittsburgh Steelers – linebacker
- Harry Hamilton – New York Jets, Tampa Bay Buccaneers – safety
- Shelly Hammonds – Minnesota Vikings – defensive back
- Chris Harrell – Arizona Cardinals, Miami Dolphins – safety
- Franco Harris – Pittsburgh Steelers, Seattle Seahawks – tailback
- Mike Hartenstine – Chicago Bears – defensive end
- Jeff Hartings – Detroit Lions, Pittsburgh Steelers – guard, center
- Michael Haynes – Chicago Bears, New Orleans Saints, New York Jets – defensive end
- Ron Heller – Tampa Bay Buccaneers, Philadelphia Eagles, Miami Dolphins – offensive tackle
- Kim Herring – Baltimore Ravens, St. Louis Rams, Cincinnati Bengals – safety
- Jordan Hill – Detroit Lions – defensive tackle, #97
- Dick Hoak – Pittsburgh Steelers – running back
- Gerald Hodges – Arizona Cardinals – linebacker, #50
- Rob Holmberg – Los Angeles/Oakland Raiders, Indianapolis Colts, New York Jets, Minnesota Vikings, New England Patriots, Green Bay Packers – linebacker
- John Hufnagel – Denver Broncos – quarterback
- Josh Hull – St. Louis Rams, Washington Redskins – linebacker #56
- Tom Hull – San Francisco 49ers, Green Bay Packers – linebacker
- Leonard Humphries – Indianapolis Colts – defensive back
- Tony Hunt – Philadelphia Eagles – running back
- Greg Huntington – Washington Redskins, Jacksonville Jaguars, Chicago Bears – offensive lineman
- Joe Iorio – Indianapolis Colts – center
- Ray Isom – Tampa Bay Buccaneers – safety
- Kenny Jackson – Philadelphia Eagles, Houston Oilers – wide receiver
- Tyoka Jackson – Miami Dolphins, Tampa Bay Buccaneers, St. Louis Rams, Detroit Lions – defensive end
- Charlie Janerette – Los Angeles Rams, New York Giants New York Jets, Denver Broncos – guard
- Bryant Johnson – Arizona Cardinals, San Francisco 49ers, Detroit Lions, Houston Texans – wide receiver, #80
- Ed Johnson – Carolina Panthers – defensive tackle, #99
- Larry Johnson – Kansas City Chiefs, Washington Redskins – tailback, #27
- Tim Johnson – Pittsburgh Steelers, Washington Redskins, Cincinnati Bengals – defensive lineman
- Bhawoh Jue – Green Bay Packers, San Diego Chargers, St. Louis Rams, Arizona Cardinals – safety
- Joe Jurevicius – New York Giants, Tampa Bay Buccaneers, Seattle Seahawks, Cleveland Browns – wide receiver
- Vyto Kab – Philadelphia Eagles, New York Giants, Detroit Lions – tight end
- Jeremy Kapinos – Pittsburgh Steelers – punter, #3
- Jimmy Kennedy – New York Giants – defensive tackle, #73
- Jim Kerr – Washington Redskins – safety
- Justin King – St. Louis Rams – cornerback, #32
- Terry Killens Houston Oilers/Tennessee Titans, San Francisco 49ers – linebacker
- Ethan Kilmer – Cincinnati Bengals, Miami Dolphins – defensive back
- Warren Koegel – Oakland Raiders, New York Jets – center
- Roger Kochman – Buffalo Bills – halfback
- Matt Kranchick – Pittsburgh Steelers, New York Giants – tight end
- Larry Kubin – Washington Redskins, Buffalo Bills, Tampa Bay Buccaneers – linebacker
- Pete Kugler – San Francisco 49ers, Philadelphia Stars (USFL) – defensive lineman
- Justin Kurpeikis – Pittsburgh Steelers, New England Patriots, Cleveland Browns, Hamburg Sea Devils, Detroit Lions – linebacker
- Ted Kwalick – Oakland Raiders, San Francisco 49ers – tight end
- Dennis Landolt – San Francisco 49ers – offensive lineman (Practice Squad)
- Paul Lankford – Miami Dolphins – defensive back
- Phil LaPorta- New Orleans Saints – offensive tackle
- Jim Laslavic – Detroit Lions, San Diego Chargers, Green Bay Packers – linebacker
- Sean Lee – Dallas Cowboys – linebacker, #50
- Bill Lenkaitis – San Diego Chargers, New England Patriots – offensive lineman
- Pete Liske – Philadelphia Eagles – quarterback
- Lew Luce – Washington Redskins – running back
- David Macklin – Indianapolis Colts, Arizona Cardinals, Washington Redskins, Kansas City Chiefs – cornerback
- Tim Manoa – Cleveland Browns, Indianapolis Colts – running back
- Rich Mauti – New Orleans Saints, Washington Redskins – wide receiver
- Aaron Maybin – Buffalo Bills, New York Jets, Cincinnati Bengals, Toronto Argonauts – linebacker
- Mark Markovich – Detroit Lions – San Diego Chargers – guard
- Shawn Mayer – New England Patriots, Atlanta Falcons, Cleveland Browns, Hamburg Sea Devils – defensive back/safety
- Mike McCloskey – Houston Oilers, Philadelphia Eagles – tight end
- Eric McCoo – Philadelphia Eagles – running back
- Quintus McDonald – Indianapolis Colts – linebacker
- O.J. McDuffie – Miami Dolphins – wide receiver
- Matt McGloin – Oakland Raiders, Philadelphia Eagles, Houston Texans – quarterback
- Kareem McKenzie – New York Jets, New York Giants – offensive tackle, #67
- Mike Meade – Green Bay Packers, Detroit Lions – running back
- Lance Mehl – New York Jets – linebacker
- Mike Michalske – New York Yankees, Green Bay Packers – guard
- Matt Millen – San Francisco 49ers, Oakland Raiders, Washington Redskins – linebacker
- Stan Mills – Green Bay Packers, Akron Pros – fullback
- Brian Milne – Cincinnati Bengals, Seattle Seahawks, New Orleans Saints – fullback
- Rich Milot – Washington Redskins – linebacker
- Lydell Mitchell – Baltimore Colts, San Diego Chargers, Los Angeles Rams – tailback
- Lenny Moore – Baltimore Colts – tailback
- Derek Moye – Miami Dolphins, New Orleans Saints, Pittsburgh Steelers, Tennessee Titans – wide receiver, #14
- Mike Munchak – Houston Oilers, Tennessee Titans – offensive guard
- Carl Nassib – Cleveland Browns, Las Vegas Raiders, Tampa Bay Buccaneers – outside linebacker
- Jim Nelson – Green Bay Packers, Minnesota Vikings, Indianapolis Colts – linebacker
- John Nessel – Atlanta Falcons – guard
- Leo Nobile – Washington Redskins, Pittsburgh Steelers – guard, linebacker
- Brandon Noble – Dallas Cowboys, Washington Redskins – defensive tackle
- Jordan Norwood – Denver Broncos – wide receiver, #10
- Ed O'Neil – Detroit Lions, Green Bay Packers – linebacker
- Jared Odrick – Miami Dolphins, Jacksonville Jaguars – defensive tackle, #98
- Rich Ohrnberger – New England Patriots, Arizona Cardinals, San Diego Chargers – guard, #62
- Dennis Onkotz – New York Jets – linebacker
- Phil Ostrowski – San Francisco 49ers – offensive guard
- Lou Palazzi – New York Giants – center, linebacker
- Irv Pankey – Los Angeles Rams, Indianapolis Colts – offensive tackle
- Chet Parlavecchio – Green Bay Packers, St. Louis Cardinals – linebacker
- Bob Parsons – Chicago Bears – quarterback, punter, tight end
- Scott Paxson – Cleveland Browns, Pittsburgh Steelers – defensive lineman
- Darren Perry – Pittsburgh Steelers, San Diego Chargers, New Orleans Saints – safety
- Charlie Pittman – St. Louis Cardinals, Baltimore Colts – running back
- Milt Plum – Cleveland Browns, Detroit Lions, Los Angeles Rams, New York Giants – quarterback
- Andre Powell – New York Giants – linebacker
- Paul Posluszny – Jacksonville Jaguars – linebacker, #51
- Andrew Quarless – Green Bay Packers, Detroit Lions – tight end, #81
- Scott Radecic – Kansas City Chiefs, Buffalo Bills, Indianapolis Colts – linebacker
- Tom Rafferty – Dallas Cowboys – offensive lineman
- Eric Ravotti – Pittsburgh Steelers – linebacker
- Mike Reid – Cincinnati Bengals – defensive tackle
- Glenn Ressler – Baltimore Colts – offensive lineman
- Matthew Rice – New York Giants, Detroit Lions – defensive end
- Wally Richardson – Baltimore Ravens, Atlanta Falcons – quarterback
- Marco Rivera – Green Bay Packers, Dallas Cowboys – guard
- Dave Robinson – Green Bay Packers, Washington Redskins – end
- Mark Robinson – Kansas City Chiefs, Tampa Bay Buccaneers – safety
- Michael Robinson – Seattle Seahawks – running back/wide receiver, #24
- Fran Rogel – Pittsburgh Steelers – running back
- Dave Rowe – New Orleans Saints, New England Patriots, San Diego Chargers, Oakland Raiders, Baltimore Colts – defensive tackle
- Evan Royster – Washington Redskins, Atlanta Falcons – running back, #35
- Todd Rucci – New England Patriots – guard
- Tony Sacca – Phoenix Cardinals – quarterback
- Bobby Samuels – Philadelphia Eagles – cornerback
- Brad Scioli – Indianapolis Colts – defensive end
- Austin Scott – Cleveland Browns – running back
- Bryan Scott – Buffalo Bills – safety, linebacker, #43
- Freddie Scott – Atlanta Falcons, Indianapolis Colts, Detroit Lions – wide receiver
- Tim Shaw – Tennessee Titans – linebacker, #57
- Tom Sherman – Cincinnati Bengals, Boston Patriots, Buffalo Bills – quarterback
- A.Q. Shipley – Philadelphia Eagles, Indianapolis Colts, Baltimore Ravens, Arizona Cardinals, Tampa Bay Buccaneers – center/guard
- Brandon Short – New York Giants, Carolina Panthers – linebacker
- Mickey Shuler – New York Jets, Philadelphia Eagles – tight end
- Mickey Shuler – Minnesota Vikings, Miami Dolphins, Jacksonville Jaguars, Atlanta Falcons – tight end
- Paul Siever – Washington Redskins – tackle
- John Skorupan – Buffalo Bills, New York Giants – linebacker
- Steve Smith – Los Angeles Raiders, Seattle Seahawks – fullback
- Pete Speros – Seattle Seahawks – offensive guard/tackle
- Devon Still – New York Jets
- Matt Suhey – Chicago Bears – fullback
- Steve Suhey – Pittsburgh Steelers – guard
- Dave Szott – Kansas City Chiefs, Washington Redskins, New York Jets – offensive guard
- Jimmy Tays – Chicago Cardinals, Chicago Bulls, Dayton Triangles, Staten Island Stapletons, Neward Tornadoes – Early NFL player
- Blair Thomas – New York Jets, New England Patriots, Dallas Cowboys, Carolina Panthers – running back
- Leroy Thompson – Pittsburgh Steelers, New England Patriots, Kansas City Chiefs, Tampa Bay Buccaneers – running back
- Michael Timpson – New England Patriots, Chicago Bears, Philadelphia Eagles – wide receiver
- Wallace Triplett – Detroit Lions, Chicago Cardinals – halfback, first African-American to play in the NFL
- John Urschel – Baltimore Ravens – guard
- Curt Warner – Seattle Seahawks, Los Angeles Rams – running back
- Kenny Watson – Washington Redskins, Cincinnati Bengals – tailback
- Floyd Wedderburn Seattle Seahawks – offensive tackle
- Derrick Williams – Detroit Lions, Pittsburgh Steelers – wide receiver
- Leo Wisniewski – Baltimore/Indianapolis Colts – defensive tackle
- Stefen Wisniewski – Pittsburgh Steelers, Philadelphia Eagles, Kansas City Chiefs – offensive lineman # 61
- Steve Wisniewski – Oakland Raiders – offensive guard
- Jon Witman – Pittsburgh Steelers – fullback
- Phil Yeboah-Kodie – Denver Broncos, Washington Redskins, Indianapolis Colts – linebacker
- Alan Zemaitis – Tampa Bay Buccaneers – cornerback
- Anthony Zettel – Detroit Lions, Cleveland Browns, Cincinnati Bengals, San Francisco 49ers, Minnesota Vikings, New Orleans Saints – defensive lineman
- Michael Zordich – New York Jets, Arizona Cardinals, Philadelphia Eagles – safety

== Other ex-players of note ==
- Tom Bradley – former Penn State defensive coordinator
- Andre Collins – Director of Retired Players, NFL Players' Association
- W.T. "Mother" Dunn – first football All-American at Penn State
- Chafie Fields – sports and talent agent
- Fran Ganter – former Penn State assistant coach
- Al Golden – head football coach, University of Miami
- Red Griffiths – All-American and former U.S. Congressman (R–Ohio)
- Galen Hall – former Penn State assistant coach; former head coach of the University of Florida
- Jim Heller – all-time leading tackler among defensive Linemen (#10 All defense), captain of '72 team
- Ron Heller – current assistant coach, Toronto Argonauts
- Dick Hoak – long-time assistant coach, Pittsburgh Steelers
- John Hufnagel – current head coach, Calgary Stampeders; former New York Giants offensive coordinator
- Joe Jackson – gridiron football player
- Richie Lucas – former quarterback; inductee, College Football Hall of Fame
- Mike McBath – co-founder/part-owner of the Orlando Predators
- John McNulty – wide receivers coach, Arizona Cardinals
- Mike McQueary – former Penn State assistant coach
- Bob Mitinger – former attorney for the American Football League Players Association, 1968–1969
- Anthony Morelli – quarterbacks coach, Plum High School
- Ed O'Neil – former assistant coach, Frankfurt Galaxy, Hamilton Tiger-Cats
- Paul Pasqualoni – defensive line coach, Dallas Cowboys; former defensive coordinator, Miami Dolphins; former head coach, Syracuse University
- Darren Perry – assistant coach, Green Bay Packers
- Matt Rhule – head football coach, Temple University
- Jon Sandusky – director of player personnel, Cleveland Browns
- John Shaffer – 1986 National Championship quarterback; head of high yield credit sales, Goldman Sachs
- Jack Sherry – two-sport star, captain of the 1954 Final Four Basketball Team
- Scott Shirley – founder and executive director of Uplifting Athletes
- Frank Spaziani – head football coach, Boston College

== See also ==
- List of Penn State Football All-Americans
