= List of Penn State Nittany Lions football All-Americans =

The following were named First Team All-America (by either the American Football Coaches Association, Associated Press, Football Writers Association of America, The Sporting News, Walter Camp Football Foundation, Sports Illustrated, Pro Football Weekly, ESPN, CBS Sports, College Football News, Rivals.com, or Scout.com) while playing American football at Penn State University:

== All-Americans ==
- W. T. (Mother) Dunn (1906)
- Bob Higgins (1915, 1919)
- Percy W. (Red) Griffiths (1920)
- Charley Way (1920)
- Glenn Killinger (1921)
- Harry (Light Horse) Wilson (1923)
- Joe Bedenk (1923)
- Leon Gajecki (1940)
- Steve Suhey (1947)
- Sam Tamburo (1948)
- Sam Valentine (1956)
- Richie Lucas (1959)
- Bob Mitinger (1961)
- Dave Robinson (1962)
- Roger Kochman (1962)
- Glenn Ressler (1964)
- Ted Kwalick (1967, 1968)
- Dennis Onkotz (1968, 1969)
- Mike Reid (1969)
- Charlie Pittman (1969)
- Neal Smith (1969)
- Jack Ham (1970)
- Dave Joyner (1971)
- Lydell Mitchell (1971)
- Charlie Zapiec (1971)
- Bruce Bannon (1972)
- John Hufnagel (1972)
- John Skorupan (1972)
- John Cappelletti (1973)
- Randy Crowder (1973)
- Ed O’Neil (1973)
- John Nessel (1974)
- Mike Hartenstine (1974)
- Chris Bahr (1975)
- Greg Buttle (1975)
- Tom Rafferty (1975)
- Kurt Allerman (1976)
- Keith Dorney (1977, 1978)
- Randy Sidler (1977)
- Mickey Shuler (1977)
- Matt Bahr (1978)
- Bruce Clark (1978, 1979)
- Chuck Fusina (1978)
- Pete Harris (1978)
- Matt Millen (1978)
- Lance Mehl (1979)
- Irv Pankey (1979)
- Bill Dugan (1980)
- Sean Farrell (1980, 1981)
- Curt Warner (1981, 1982)
- Walker Lee Ashley (1982)
- Kenny Jackson (1982, 1983)
- Mark Robinson (1982)
- Michael Zordich (1985)
- Shane Conlan (1985, 1986)
- Chris Conlin (1986)
- D. J. Dozier (1986)
- Tim Johnson (1986)
- Steve Wisniewski (1987, 1988)
- Andre Collins (1989)
- Blair Thomas (1989)
- Darren Perry (1991)
- O. J. McDuffie (1992)
- Lou Benfatti (1993)
- Kyle Brady (1994)
- Ki-Jana Carter (1994)
- Kerry Collins (1994)
- Bobby Engram (1994)
- Jeff Hartings (1994, 1995)
- Kim Herring (1996)
- Curtis Enis (1997)
- LaVar Arrington (1998, 1999)
- Courtney Brown (1999)
- Brandon Short (1999)
- Michael Haynes (2002)
- Larry Johnson (2002)
- Jimmy Kennedy (2002)
- Tamba Hali (2005)
- Paul Posluszny (2005, 2006)
- Alan Zemaitis (2005)
- Dan Connor (2006, 2007)
- Sean Lee (2007)
- A. Q. Shipley (2008)
- Aaron Maybin (2008)
- Jared Odrick (2009)
- Stefen Wisniewski (2010)
- Devon Still (2011)
- Michael Mauti (2012)
- Allen Robinson (2013)
- Carl Nassib (2015)
- Saquon Barkley (2017)
- Micah Parsons (2019)
- Jaquan Brisker (2021)
- Olu Fashanu (2023)
- Abdul Carter (2024)
- Tyler Warren (2024)

== Academic All-Americans ==
The following were named First Team Academic All-America by the College Sports Information Directors of America (CoSIDA) while playing at Penn State:

- Joe Bellas (1965)
- John Runnells (1965, 1966)
- Rich Buzin (1967)
- Dennis Onkotz (1969)
- Charlie Pittman (1969)
- Dave Joyner (1971)
- Bruce Bannon (1972)
- Mark Markovich (1973)
- Chuck Benjamin (1976)
- Keith Dorney (1978)
- Todd Blackledge (1982)
- Scott Radecic (1982)
- Harry Hamilton (1982, 1983)
- Lance Hamilton (1984, 1985)
- Carmen Masciantonio (1984)
- John Shaffer (1986)
- Jeff Hartings (1994, 1995)
- Tony Pittman (1994)
- Travis Forney (1999)
- Joe Iorio (2002)
- Andrew Guman (2004)
- Paul Posluszny (2005, 2006)
- Tim Shaw (2006)
- Gerald Cadogan (2007, 2008)
- Josh Hull (2008, 2009)
- Andrew Pitz (2008, 2009)
- Mark Rubin (2008)
- Stefen Wisniewski (2008, 2009, 2010)
- Chris Colasanti (2010)
- Pete Massaro (2010, 2012)
- John Urschel (2012, 2013)
- Tyler Yazujian (2016)
- Blake Gillikin (2018, 2019)
- Sean Clifford (2020)
- Eric Wilson (2021)
