= 1973 Penn State Nittany Lions football team =

American college football season

1973 Penn State Nittany Lions football

Eastern champion Orange Bowl champion

Orange Bowl, W 16–9 vs. LSU
- Conference: Independent

Ranking
- Coaches: No. 5
- AP: No. 5
- Record: 12–0
- Head coach: Joe Paterno (8th season)
- Offensive scheme: I formation
- Defensive coordinator: Jim O'Hora (8th season)
- Base defense: 4–3
- Captains: John Cappelletti; Randy Crowder; Mark Markovich; Ed O'Neil
- Home stadium: Beaver Stadium

1973 NCAA Division I independents football records
	Conf.			Overall
Team	W	L	T	W		L		T
No. 1 Notre Dame		–		11	–	0	–	0
No. 5 Penn State		–		12	–	0	–	0
No. 9 Houston		–		11	–	1	–	0
Temple		–		9	–	1	–	0
No. 20 Tulane		–		9	–	3	–	0
Memphis State		–		8	–	3	–	0
Tampa		–		8	–	3	–	0
Boston College		–		7	–	4	–	0
South Carolina		–		7	–	4	–	0
Utah State		–		7	–	4	–	0
Air Force		–		6	–	4	–	0
Southern Miss		–		6	–	4	–	1
Northern Illinois		–		6	–	5	–	0
Rutgers		–		6	–	5	–	0
West Virginia		–		6	–	5	–	0
Pittsburgh		–		6	–	5	–	1
Colgate		–		5	–	5	–	0
Dayton		–		5	–	5	–	1
Xavier		–		5	–	5	–	1
Georgia Tech		–		5	–	6	–	0
Holy Cross		–		5	–	6	–	0
Miami (FL)		–		5	–	6	–	0
Cincinnati		–		4	–	7	–	0
Marshall		–		4	–	7	–	0
Navy		–		4	–	7	–	0
Southern Illinois		–		3	–	7	–	1
Villanova		–		3	–	8	–	0
Syracuse		–		2	–	9	–	0
Virginia Tech		–		2	–	9	–	0
Army		–		0	–	10	–	0
Florida State		–		0	–	11	–	0
Rankings from AP Poll

The 1973 Penn State Nittany Lions football team represented Pennsylvania State University as an independent during the 1973 NCAA Division I football season. Led by eighth-year head coach Joe Paterno, the Nittany Lions compiled a perfect record of 12–0 with a win over LSU in the Orange Bowl. The team was the third under Paterno to go undefeated, following consecutive perfect seasons in 1968 and 1969. John Cappelletti, senior running back, won the Heisman Trophy as the most outstanding player in college football. Penn State played home games at Beaver Stadium in University Park, Pennsylvania.

== Schedule ==
Date	Time	Opponent	Rank	Site	TV	Result	Attendance	Source
September 15	3:50 p.m.	at Stanford	No. 7	Stanford Stadium; Stanford, CA	ABC	W 20–6	57,000	
September 22	2:00 p.m.	at Navy	No. 7	Navy–Marine Corps Memorial Stadium; Annapolis, MD		W 39–0	28,383	
September 29		Iowa^{†}	No. 6	Beaver Stadium; University Park, PA		W 27–8	59,980	
October 6	3:57 p.m.	at Air Force	No. 7	Falcon Stadium; Colorado Springs, CO	ABC	W 19–9	37,077	
October 13	1:30 p.m.	Army	No. 7	Beaver Stadium; University Park, PA		W 54–3	58,194	
October 20		at Syracuse	No. 5	Archbold Stadium; Syracuse, NY (rivalry)		W 49–6	27,595	
October 27		West Virginia	No. 5	Beaver Stadium; University Park, PA (rivalry)		W 62–14	59,138	
November 3		at Maryland	No. 6	Byrd Stadium; College Park, MD (rivalry)		W 42–22	44,135	
November 10		NC State	No. 6	Beaver Stadium; University Park, PA		W 35–29	59,424	
November 17	1:30 p.m.	Ohio	No. 6	Beaver Stadium; University Park, PA		W 49–10	51,804	
November 24		No. 20 Pittsburgh	No. 6	Beaver Stadium; University Park, PA (rivalry)		W 35–13	56,600	
January 1, 1974		vs. No. 13 LSU	No. 6	Miami Orange Bowl; Miami, FL (Orange Bowl)	NBC	W 16–9	60,477	
^{†}Homecoming; Rankings from AP Poll released prior to the game; All times are in Eastern time; Source:

== Game summaries ==
=== Stanford ===
Quarter	1	2	3	4	Total
#7 Penn State	0	10	7	3	20
Stanford	0	0	0	6	6

at Stanford Stadium • Stanford, CA

- Date: Saturday, September 15
- Game attendance: 57,000

Game information

Second Quarter

- PSU — Safety blocked kick went out of the end zone.
- PSU — Hayman 14-yard pass from Shuman (Natale pass from Shuman).

Third Quarter

- PSU — Cappelletti 2-yard run (Bahr kick).

Fourth Quarter

- PSU — Field goal, Bahr 24 yards.
- Stan — Stone 8-yard pass from Boryla (pass failed).

Penn State’s defense dominated Stanford, consistently applying pressure and forcing the opposing offense into hurried plays. The Nittany Lions’ blitzing strategy disrupted Stanford’s rhythm, resulting in sacks, turnovers, and limited offensive production, but Penn State was mostly unable to convert that pressure into points. The scoring started in the second quarter when Lion defensemen Greg Murphy and Doug Allen broke through the punt defense, with Allen belting the ball through the end zone for a safety. Late in the half, Jimmy Bradley recovered a fumble at the Stanford 10 yard line to set up another score two plays later when quarterback Tom Shuman found Gary Hayman from 14 yards out. In the second half, Cappelletti and Bahr rounded out the scoring for Penn State and Stanford scored against the Penn State reserves with three minutes left in the game.

=== Navy ===
Quarter	1	2	3	4	Total
#7 Penn State	7	20	10	2	39
Navy	0	0	0	0	0

at Navy–Marine Corps Memorial Stadium • Annapolis, MD

- Date: Saturday, September 22
- Game attendance: 28,383
- Recap

Game information

First Quarter

- PSU - Heyman 17-yard pass from Shuman (Bahr kick)

Second Quarter

- PSU - Cappelletti 10-yard run (Bahr kick)
- PSU - Herd 23-yard pass from Shuman (kick failed)
- PSU - Shuman 1-yard run (Bahr kick)

Third Quarter

- PSU - Bahr 22-yard field goal
- PSU - Clark 1-yard run (Bahr kick)

Fourth Quarter

- PSU - Safety, Navy center snapped ball out of end zone

Penn State capitalized on a fumble and two short punts to score three second-quarter touchdowns and break the game wide open against Navy. The Nittany Lions opened scoring with just one second left in the first as QB Tom Shuman hit SE Gary Heyman for a touchdown to cap an 88-yard drive. On the first play after the ensuing kickoff, E Greg Murphy recovered a fumble by RB Bob Jackson at the Navy 41, and the Lions took two-and-a-half minutes and five plays to score again. Penn State scored on two more quick drives of 60 and 51 yards following short punts into a stiff wind by John Stufflebeem. The Lions added a field goal by Chris Bahr midway through the third and backup QB John Clark capped a 56-yard drive with a keeper to put Penn State ahead 37-0. The final points of the contest came when a snap from Navy's center sailed over Stufflebeem's head and out of the end zone for a safety.

=== Iowa ===
Quarter	1	2	3	4	Total
Iowa	0	0	0	8	8
#6 Penn State	21	0	6	0	27

at Beaver Stadium • University Park, PA

- Date: Saturday, September 29
- Game attendance: 59,980

Game information

First Quarter

- PSU — Cappelletti 16-yard run (Bahr kick).
- PSU — Herd 9-yard pass from Shuman (Bahr kick).
- PSU — Bland 32-yard pass from Shuman (Bahr kick).

Third Quarter

- PSU — Herd 12-yard pass from Shuman (kick failed).

Fourth Quarter

- Iowa — Jensen 7-yard pass from Caldwell (Caldwell run).

=== Air Force ===
Penn State vs. Air Force

Quarter	1	2	3	4	Total
Air Force	3	0	0	6	9
#7 Penn State	0	13	6	0	19

at Falcon Stadium • Colorado Springs, CO

- Date: Saturday, October 6, 1973
- Game attendance: 37,077

Game information

First Quarter

- AFA — Gary Lawson 44-yard field goal

Second Quarter

- PSU — Gary Hayman 38-yard pass from Tom Shuman (Reihner kick)
- PSU — John Cappelletti 4-yard run (kick failed)

Third Quarter

- PSU — John Cappelletti 8-yard run (kick failed)

Fourth Quarter

- AFA — Billy Berry 45-yard pass from Rich Haynie (kick failed)

Team	Category	Player	Statistics
AFA	Passing	Rich Haynie	TD pass
AFA	Rushing		
AFA	Receiving	Billy Berry	45-yard TD reception
PSU	Passing	Tom Shuman	TD pass to Gary Hayman
PSU	Rushing	John Cappelletti	184 Rush Yds, 2 TD
PSU	Receiving	Gary Hayman	38-yard TD reception

Penn State defeated Air Force 19–9 on October 6, 1973, in a regionally televised game at Falcon Stadium in Colorado Springs. The Nittany Lions were held scoreless for more than a quarter by a quick and physical Air Force defense, which took an early 3–0 lead on Gary Lawson’s 44-yard field goal. Penn State broke through midway through the second quarter when quarterback Tom Shuman connected with Gary Hayman on a 38-yard touchdown pass.

Only 34 seconds later, following an Air Force fumble, John Cappelletti scored on a four-yard run to extend the lead. Cappelletti added his second touchdown early in the third quarter on an eight-yard run after Penn State marched 80 yards in seven plays following an end-zone interception by defensive back Jim Bradley. Air Force did not score again until the final period, when Rich Haynie threw a 45-yard touchdown pass to Billy Berry.

Cappelletti rushed for a then career-high 184 yards and two touchdowns, leading Penn State to its fourth straight victory and improving the Nittany Lions to 4–0 on the season.

=== Army ===
Penn State defeated Army 54–3 on October 13, 1973, at Beaver Stadium in University Park, Pennsylvania, before a crowd of 58,194. The victory marked the Nittany Lions’ fifth win of the season and kept them undefeated and untied. Penn State scored 26 points in the first quarter. Bob Nagle opened the scoring with a 10-yard touchdown run, followed by a 66-yard touchdown pass from Tom Shuman to Jimmy Scott. Fullback Tom Donchez added two rushing touchdowns later in the opening period, one set up by an interception and another following a long completion to Dan Natale.

Army managed its only points of the game in the second quarter on a 46-yard field goal by Jim Barclay. Penn State continued to score throughout the remainder of the contest, even after substituting reserves into the lineup. Nagle scored his second touchdown of the game, and Walt Addie added a 64-yard scoring run. Backup quarterback Dick Barvinchak later connected with Jim Eaise on a 35-yard touchdown pass, and John Huttenberger scored the final touchdown for Penn State.

Although John Cappelletti did not score, he led the offense with 151 rushing yards on 17 carries and set up several early touchdowns. Penn State amassed a season-high 607 yards of total offense, including 441 rushing yards. The Nittany Lion defense limited Army to 53 rushing yards and pressured quarterback King Fink throughout the game, recording multiple sacks.

=== Syracuse ===
Team	1	2	3	4	Total
• Penn St	3	19	21	6	49
Syracuse	0	0	6	0	6

- Date: October 20
- Location: Archbold Stadium • Syracuse, NY
- Game attendance: 27,595

Scoring summary
1	PSU	Bahr 50-yard field goal	Penn St 3–0
2	PSU	Bahr 21-yard field goal	Penn St 6–0
2	PSU	Shuman 1-yard run (pass failed)	Penn St 12–0
2	PSU	Nagle 1-yard run (Bahr kick)	Penn St 19–0
2	PSU	Bahr 33-yard field goal	Penn St 22–0
3	SYR	Brennan 16-yard pass from Milch (pass failed)	Penn St 22–6
3	PSU	Nagle 78-yard fumble recovery (Bahr kick)	Penn St 29–6
3	PSU	Taylor 1-yard run (Bahr kick)	Penn St 36–6
3	PSU	Boyle 4-yard run (Bahr kick)	Penn St 43–6
4	PSU	Barvinchak 4-yard run (kick failed)	Penn St 49–6

=== West Virginia ===
Quarter	1	2	3	4	Total
West Virginia	0	14	0	0	14
#5 Penn State	14	14	14	20	62

at Beaver Stadium • University Park, PA

- Date: Saturday, October 27
- Game attendance: 59,138
- Box Score

Game information

First Quarter

- PSU — Cappelletti 10-yard run (Bahr kick).
- PSU — Cappelletti 2-yard run (Bahr kick).

Second Quarter

- PSU — Herd 76-yard pass from Shuman (Bahr kick).
- WVU — Buggs 96-yard pass from Williams (Nester kick).
- PSU — Cappelletti 5-yard run (Bahr kick).
- WVU — Owens 95-yard kickoff return (Nester kick).

Third Quarter

- PSU — Nagle 53-yard run (Bahr kick).
- PSU — Cappelletti 2-yard run (Bahr kick).

Fourth Quarter

- PSU — Boyle 4-yard run (Bahr kick).
- PSU — Pirogowicz 6-yard run (pass failed).
- PSU — Buttle 25-yard interception return (Reihner kick).

Team	Category	Player	Statistics
WVU	Passing	Ben Williams Jr.	6/22, 166 Yds, TD, 4 INT
WVU	Rushing	Dwyane Woods	14 Rush, 26 Yds
WVU	Receiving	Danny Buggs	1 Rec, 96 Yds, TD
PSU	Passing	Tom Shuman	6/18, 175 Yds, TD
PSU	Rushing	John Cappelletti	24 Rush, 130 Yds, 4 TD
PSU	Receiving	Chuck Herd	1 Rec, 76 Yds, TD

=== Maryland ===
Penn State vs. Maryland

Quarter	1	2	3	4	Total
#6 Penn State	12	10	20	0	42
Maryland	10	12	0	0	22

at Byrd Stadium • College Park, MD

- Date: Saturday, November 3, 1973
- Game attendance: 44,135

Game information

First Quarter

- PSU — Hayman 98-yard kickoff return (kick failed).
- PSU — Nagle 3-yard run (pass failed).
- MD — Russell 34-yard pass from Roy (Mike-Mayer kick).
- MD — FG Mike-Mayer 21.

Second Quarter

- MD — White 11-yard pass from Carter (pass failed).
- PSU — Natale 17-yard pass from Shuman (Bahr kick).
- PSU — FG Bahr 39.
- MD — Smith 83-yard punt return (kick failed).

Third Quarter

- PSU — Scott 29-yard pass from Shuman (Bahr kick).
- PSU — Natale 3-yard pass from Shuman (Bahr kick).
- PSU — FG Bahr 25.
- PSU — FG Bahr 28.

Fourth Quarter

- (No scoring)

Team	Category	Player	Statistics
PSU	Passing	Shuman	7/14, 111 Yds, 3 TD
PSU	Rushing	Cappelletti	37 Rush, 202 Yds
PSU	Receiving	Natale	6 Rec, 82 Yds, 2 TD
MD	Passing	Neville	10/25, 86 Yds, 2 INT
MD	Rushing	Carter	12 Rush, 30 Yds
MD	Receiving	White	4 Rec, 60 Yds, 1 TD

=== Ohio ===
Penn State vs. Ohio

Quarter	1	2	3	4	Total
Ohio	7	0	3	0	10
#6 Penn State	14	14	21	0	49

at Beaver Stadium • University Park, PA

- Date: Saturday, November 10, 1973
- Game attendance: 51,804

Game information

First Quarter

- PSU — John Cappelletti 1-yard run (Chris Bahr kick).
- Ohio — Bevly 2 yard run (Homer kick).
- PSU — John Cappelletti 1-yard run (Bahr kick).

Second Quarter

- PSU — John Cappelletti 25-yard run (Bahr kick).
- PSU — John Cappelletti 15-yard run (Bahr kick).

Third Quarter

- PSU — Tom Hull 29-yard blocked punt return (Bahr kick).
- PSU — Ed O’Neil 66-yard interception return (Bahr kick).
- Ohio — Homer 57-yard FG.
- PSU — Walt Addie 18-yard run (Bahr kick).

Fourth Quarter

- (no scoring).

Team	Category	Player	Statistics
OU	Passing	Rich Bevly	TD run, INT
OU	Rushing		
OU	Receiving	Mike Green	Multiple receptions
PSU	Passing	Tom Shuman	
PSU	Rushing	John Cappelletti	204 Yds, 4 TD
PSU	Receiving	Dan Natale	Key 30-yard reception

Penn State tailback John Cappelletti delivered one of the most dominant performances of his career, rushing for 204 yards and scoring four touchdowns in less than 30 minutes of play as the sixth-ranked Nittany Lions defeated Ohio, 49–10, at Beaver Stadium. The victory marked Penn State’s 10th consecutive win of the season and its 20th straight regular-season victory overall. Cappelletti scored all four of his touchdowns in the first half, becoming Penn State’s second-leading all-time rusher and strengthening his Heisman Trophy candidacy. Penn State’s defense and special teams added to the rout in the second half, as linebacker Tom Hull returned a blocked punt 29 yards for a touchdown and Ed O’Neil intercepted a pass and returned it 66 yards for another score.

=== Pitt ===
Penn State vs. Pitt

Quarter	1	2	3	4	Total
#20 Pitt	0	13	0	0	13
#6 Penn State	3	0	8	24	35

at Beaver Stadium • University Park, PA

- Date: Saturday, November 24, 1973
- Game attendance: 56,600

Game information

First quarter

- PSU — Chris Bahr 40-yard field goal

Second quarter

- Pitt — Tony Dorsett 14-yard run (Carson Long kick)
- Pitt — Carson Long 31-yard field goal
- Pitt — Carson Long 50-yard field goal

Third quarter

- PSU — Bob Nagle 1-yard run (Hayman pass from Shuman)

Fourth quarter

- PSU — John Cappelletti 5-yard run (Bahr kick)
- PSU — Tom Hull 27-yard interception return (Bahr kick)
- PSU — Chuck Herd 32-yard pass from Tom Shuman (Bahr kick)
- PSU — Chris Bahr 45-yard field goal

Team	Category	Player	Statistics
Pitt	Passing	Billy Daniels	5/19, 122 Yds, 2 INT
Pitt	Rushing	Tony Dorsett	20 Rush, 77 Yds, 1 TD
Pitt	Receiving		
PSU	Passing	Tom Shuman	7/17, 96 Yds, 1 TD
PSU	Rushing	John Cappelletti	37 Rush, 161 Yds, 1 TD
PSU	Receiving	Chuck Herd	1 Rec, 32 Yds, 1 TD

Penn State overcame a 13–3 halftime deficit with a dominant second-half performance to defeat Pittsburgh 35–13 on November 24, 1973, before 56,600 fans at Beaver Stadium. The Panthers controlled much of the first half behind freshman Tony Dorsett, who scored on a 14-yard touchdown run and finished with 77 rushing yards. Pitt also added two field goals by Carson Long while limiting the Nittany Lions to a single Chris Bahr field goal before intermission.

Penn State’s defense turned the game in the third quarter, holding Pittsburgh to just 15 yards and no first downs in the period. Penn State narrowed Pitt's lead to 13-11 when Fullback Bob Nagle scored from 1 yard out and Hayman added the 2-point conversion on a reception. John Cappelletti put Penn State ahead for good on 5-yard touchdown and the game was sealed when Linebacker Tom Hull tallied a 27-yard interception return for a touchdown.

Cappelletti, a leading Heisman Trophy candidate, rushed for 161 yards on 37 carries and was named the game’s outstanding player. The victory capped an undefeated 11–0 regular season for Penn State and secured its bid to the Orange Bowl.

=== LSU ===
1974 Orange Bowl: Penn State vs. LSU

Quarter	1	2	3	4	Total
#13 LSU	7	0	2	0	9
#6 Penn State	3	13	0	0	16

at Miami Orange Bowl • Miami, FL

- Date: Tuesday, January 1, 1974
- Game attendance: 60,477
- Referee: James M. Artley (SEC)
- TV announcers (NBC): Jim Simpson and Kyle Rote

Game information

First quarter

- LSU – Steve Rogers 3-yard run (Jackson kick)
- Penn State – Chris Bahr 44-yard field goal

Second quarter

- Penn State – Chuck Herd 72-yard pass from Tom Shuman (C.Bahr kick)
- Penn State – John Cappelletti 1-yard run (kick failed)

Third quarter

- LSU – Team safety, Brian Masella downed in end zone

Fourth quarter
No scoring

Team	Category	Player	Statistics
LSU	Passing	Miley	8/18, 73 Yds, INT
LSU	Rushing	Davis	19 Rush, 70 Yds
LSU	Receiving	Davis	6 Rec, 20 Yds
PSU	Passing	Shuman	6/17, 157 Yds, TD, INT
PSU	Rushing	Cappelletti	26 Rush, 50 Yds, TD
PSU	Receiving	Herd	1 Rec, 72 Yds, TD

== Roster ==
1973 Penn State Nittany Lions football team roster
Players
Coaches
Offense

Pos.	#	Name	Class
QB	16	Dick Barvinchak	So
OT	74	Jeff Bleamer	Jr
RB	22	John Cappelletti	Sr
TE	81	Ron Coder	So
RB	32	Tom Donchez	Jr
OT	77	Charlie Getty	Sr
C	51	Bill Johnson	Jr
WR	28	Gary Hayman	Sr
OT	65	Phil LaPorta	Sr
C	54	Mark Markovich	Sr
G	61	John Nessel	Jr
G	72	Tom Rafferty	So
WR	19	Jimmy Scott	Sr
QB	12	Tom Shuman	Sr

Defense

Pos.	#	Name	Class
LB		Kurt Allerman	Fr
LB	68	Doug Allen	Sr
LB	67	Greg Buttle	So
DT	53	Randy Crowder	Sr
LB	66	Chris Devlin	Jr
DE	85	Dave Graf	Jr
DE	79	Mike Hartenstine	Jr
LB	41	Tom Hull	Sr
S	11	Jack Koniszewski	Sr
S	14	Scott Mitchell	Sr
LB	87	Ed O'Neil	Sr
LB	33	James Rosecrans	So

Special teams

Pos.	#	Name	Class
K	99	Chris Bahr	So

Head coach

- Joe Paterno

Coordinators/assistant coaches

- Dick Anderson
- Booker Brooks
- John Chuckran
- Jim O'Hora
- Frank Patrick
- Bob Phillips
- Jerry Sandusky
- J. T. White

Legend

- (C) Team captain
- (S) Suspended
- (I) Ineligible
- Injured
- Redshirt

Roster

== Statistics ==
=== Passing ===
Player	Comp	Att	Yards	TD	INT
Shuman	83	161	1,375	13	5
Barvinchak	8	15	163	1	2
Cappelletti	1	2	17	0	0
Clark	1	4	−3	0	0
Petchel	0	1	0	0	0

=== Rushing ===
Player	Yards	Attempts	Avg	TDs
Cappelletti	1,522	286	5.3	17
Nagle	343	77	4.5	7
Addie	311	43	7.2	2
Donchez	299	58	5.2	2
Petchel	143	34	4.2	2
Boyle	125	28	4.5	2
Huttenberger	93	19	4.9	1
Taylor	44	16	2.8	1
Barvinchak	33	21	1.6	1
Scott	24	2	12.0	0
Herd	20	5	4.0	0
Pirogowicz	16	4	4.0	1
Eaise	1	1	1.0	0
Clark	−16	5	−3.2	1
Shuman	−42	44	−1.0	2

=== Receiving ===
Player	Receptions	Yards	Avg	TDs
Hayman	30	525	17.5	3
Natale	21	359	17.1	2
Herd	10	197	19.7	5
Scott	8	150	18.8	2
Cappelletti	6	69	11.5	0
Eaise	5	92	18.4	1
Bland	3	85	28.3	1
Donchez	3	32	10.7	0
Nagle	3	19	6.3	0
Jeram	1	22	22.0	0
Addie	1	10	10.0	0
Boyle	1	−3	−3.0	0
Nessel	1	−5	−5.0	0

=== Kick returns ===
Player	Returns	Avg	Yards	TDs
Hayman	8	29.6	237	1
Bland	4	21.8	87	0
Zmudzin	4	8.5	34	0
Eaise	3	6.7	20	0
Petchel	2	23.0	46	0
Cappelletti	1	25.0	25	0
Hite	1	19.0	19	0
Williams	1	5.0	5	0

=== Punt returns ===
Player	Returns	Avg	Yards	TDs
Hayman	23	19.2	442	1
Eaise	15	7.9	119	0
Zur	2	30.0	60	0
Bradley	2	8.0	16	0
Odell	2	2.0	2	0
Hull	1	29.0	29	1
Allen	1	6.0	6	0
Cappelletti	2	−4.5	−9	0
Petchel	1	5.0	5	0

=== Kicking ===
Player	Points	FG Made–Attempts	Avg	XP Made–Attempts
Bahr	70	11–19	.578	37–42
Reihner	5	0–1	.000	5–7

=== Punting ===
Player	Avg	Punts	Yards
Masella	36.6	48	1,757
Clark	41.5	4	166

=== Interceptions ===
Player	INT	Yards	TDs
Bradley	4	59	0
Mitchell	3	23	0
Ellis	3	15	0
O’Neil	2	68	1
Hull	2	51	1
Allen	2	36	0
Buttle	1	25	1
Devlin	1	16	0
Zur	1	12	0

=== Tackles ===
Player	Tackles
Hartenstine	104
Buttle	38

=== Scoring ===
Player	Points	TDs	FG	XP+2pt
Cappelletti	102	17	0	0
Bahr	70	0	11	37
Nagle	42	7	0	0
Hayman	32	5	0	1*
Herd	30	5	0	0
Natale	20	3	0	1*
Addie	12	2	0	0
Boyle	12	2	0	0
Donchez	12	2	0	0
Hull	12	2	0	0
Scott	12	2	0	0
Shuman	12	2	0	0
Barvinchak	6	1	0	0
Bland	6	1	0	0
Buttle	6	1	0	0
Clark	6	1	0	0
Eaise	6	1	0	0
Huttenberger	6	1	0	0
O'Neil	6	1	0	0
Pirogowicz	6	1	0	0
Taylor	6	1	0	0
Reihner	5	0	0	5

== Awards ==
- John Cappelletti

Heisman Trophy
Maxwell Award
Walter Camp Award

== NFL draft ==
Ten Nittany Lions were drafted in the 1974 NFL draft.

Round	Pick	Overall	Name	Position	Team
1st	8	8	Ed O'Neil	Linebacker	Detroit Lions
1st	11	11	John Cappelletti	Running back	Los Angeles Rams
2nd	1	27	Doug Allen	Linebacker	Buffalo Bills
2nd	15	41	Charlie Getty	Offensive tackle	Kansas City Chiefs
2nd	17	43	Mark Markovich	Center	San Diego Chargers
5th	2	106	Gary Hayman	Running back	Buffalo Bills
6th	6	136	Randy Crowder	Defensive tackle	Miami Dolphins
9th	9	217	Phil LaPorta	Offensive tackle	New Orleans Saints
10th	22	256	Chuck Herd	Wide receiver	Cincinnati Bengals
12th	8	294	Tom Hull	Linebacker	San Francisco 49ers
