= The Nine Lives of Marion Barry =

- theatrical poster
- Directed by: Dana Flor; Toby Oppenheimer
- Produced by: Julie Goldman
- Starring: Marion Barry
- Music by: Glenn Schloss
- Production company: IndiePix
- Distributed by: HBO Documentary Films
- Release date: August 10, 2009
- Running time: 78 minutes
- Country: United States
- Language: English

The Nine Lives of Marion Barry is a 2009 HBO documentary about the life of American politician Marion Barry. The film was scored by musicians Erik Blicker and Glenn Schloss.

== Contributors ==
- Ivan Donaldson, former deputy Mayor
- Jesse Jackson, activist
- Adrienne Washington, The Washington Times
- Marshall Brown, political advisor
- Lawrence Guyot, civil rights activist
- Gerald Bruce Lee, United States District Judge
- Carroll Harvey, PRIDE co-founder
- George Pelecanos, writer
- Max Barry, political advisor
- Effi Barry, ex-wife
- Jim Vance, journalist
- Bruce Johnson, journalist
- Maurice Jackson, Georgetown professor
- Bill Regardie, magazine publisher
- Bruce Brown, filmmaker
- Jonetta Rose-Barras, author
- Tom Sherwood, journalist
- Harry Jaffe, journalist
- Michael Fauntroy, GWU professor
- Jonathan Agronsky
- Rock Newman, boxing promoter and activist
