= Glenn Schloss =

American drummer (born 1972)

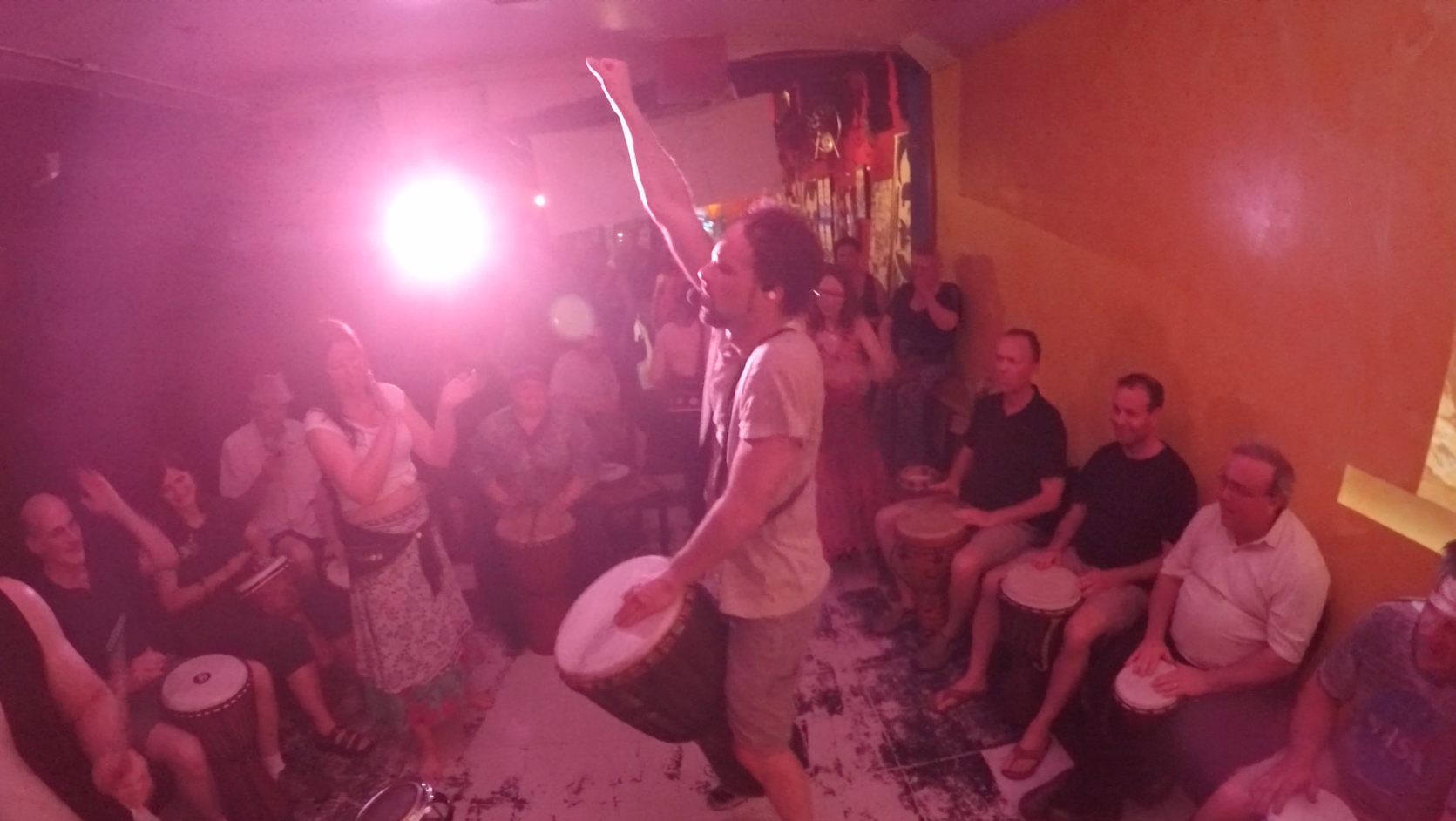
- Schloss leading drum circle in Nyack, New York in 2015.

Background information
- Born: July 1, 1972 (age 54); Tappan, New York, U.S.
- Occupations: Television composer; film composer; musician; writer; drum circle facilitator
- Instruments: Drums; keyboards; piano; xylophone
- Years active: 1994–present
- Website: flavorlab.com

Glenn Schloss (born July 1, 1972) is an American television & film composer, musician, entrepreneur, writer and drum circle facilitator.

== Early life ==
Schloss was born and raised in Tappan, New York. He was musically inspired as a child by his parents and older brother. At age 7, he began playing the xylophone followed by the drums and keyboard. His early musical influences were Frank Zappa, Pat Metheny, Iron Maiden, John Coltrane, Stevie Wonder and Jimi Hendrix.

== Television ==
Schloss composed the theme music for the Emmy Award winning talk show, The View with writing and business partner, Erik Blicker. His other television composing credits include: MSNBC's The McVeigh Tapes: Confessions of an American Terrorist, The History Channel's Extreme History with Roger Daltrey, MTV's Catfish: The TV Show, Spike TV's The Team, BBC's Never Mind The Buzzcocks, HBO's 30 by 30: Kid Flicks, VH1's Being, VH1's Rock Story, VH1's Rock Across America, VH1's The Greatest, NYC Media's The Big Quiz Thing and ESPN's Sports Center.

== Film ==
Schloss's film composing credits include HBO's The Nine Lives of Marion Barry, The Sundance Channel's Positive Voices: Matthew Cusick, MSNBC's The Assassination of Dr. Tiller, Synthetic Cinema International's Dark Haul, Breaking Glass Pictures' Gone and New Line Cinema's We Married Margo.

== Entrepreneurship ==
Schloss formed the television music production company, G&E Music with business partner Erik Blicker in 1997. In 2004, Schloss, Blicker and Brian Quill created Flavorlab, a music production company for television, film, commercials and video games.

== Contributing writer ==
Schloss writes articles for the music production industry website, SonicScoop.com.

== Drum circle facilitator ==
Schloss created For Vibration, a live drum circle and guided groove meditation in 2012 based in Nyack, New York.

== Personal life ==
Schloss is married to voice over actress Elena Schloss and they have three children. Schloss is the brother of the Today Show's health and nutrition expert, Joy Bauer.
