= Cedar Cliff =

- U.S. National Register of Historic Places
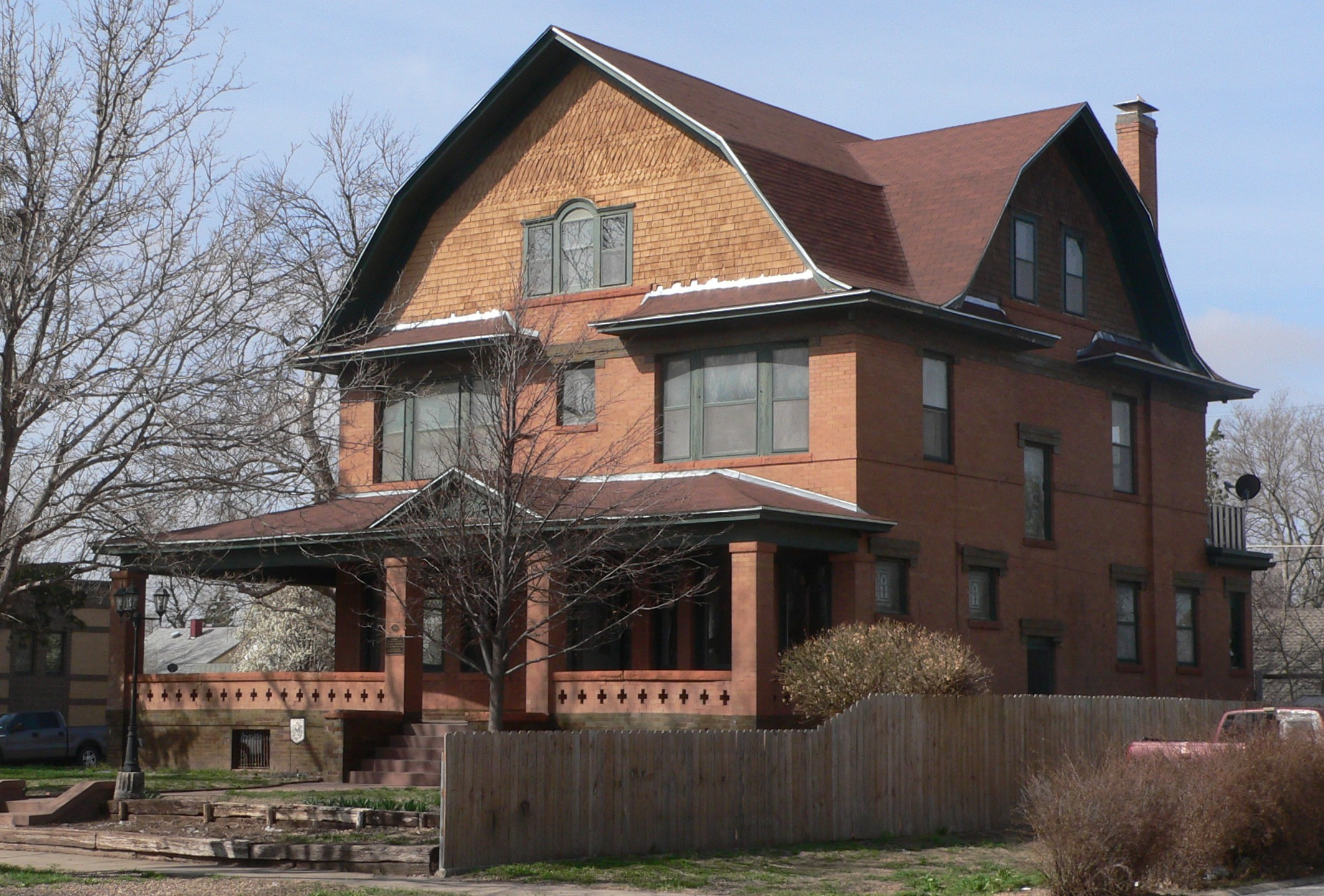

- Location within Kansas Location within the United States
- Location: 501 N. 9th St., Garden City, Kansas
- Coordinates: 37°58′11″N 100°52′35″W
- Area: less than one acre
- Built: 1909
- Built by: Edward Finnup
- Architectural style: Dutch Colonial Revival
- NRHP reference No.: 97000464
- Added to NRHP: May 23, 1997

Cedar Cliff, a house at 501 N. 9th St. in Garden City, Kansas, United States, was built in 1909. It was listed on the National Register of Historic Places in 1997. It has also been known as the Edward G. Finnup House.

It is a "majestic" three-story Dutch Colonial Revival-style house with a center hall plan.

== See also ==
- Little Finnup House, also NRHP-listed in Garden City
