= Dan Herbeck =

American author and journalist

- Born: October 31, 1954 (age 71); Mineral Wells, Texas, U.S.
- Education: St. Bonaventure University
- Occupations: Author, Investigative journalist
- Spouse: Joyce Herbeck
- Children: 2
- Writing career
- Notable work: American Terrorist

Dan Herbeck (born October 31, 1954) is an American journalist and author who is an investigative reporter at The Buffalo News.

== Biography ==
Herbeck was born in Mineral Wells, Texas, and raised in Amherst, New York. Herbeck graduated high school in 1972 from Sweet Home High School in Amherst New York. In 2012 he was inducted into the high school's Alumni Hall of Fame. After graduating from Erie Community College, Herbeck graduated from St. Bonaventure University in 1978 with a bachelor's degree in journalism. He was inducted into the Erie Community College Alumni Hall of Fame in 2013 and is also a member of the St. Bonaventure Mass Communications Wall of Fame.

== Journalism career ==
Herbeck has been writing for The Buffalo News since 1978. With his frequent Buffalo News partners Lou Michel and Michael Beebe, he has won national and state awards for investigative stories on telemarketing fraud, bankruptcy fraud, government corruption, the New York state prison system, prescription drug abuse and other issues.

== American Terrorist ==
Herbeck co-wrote American Terrorist, with Lou Michel about Timothy McVeigh, whom they interviewed. The book by Herbeck and Michel was a New York Times bestseller in 2001. It detailed the life story of McVeigh, a U.S. Army veteran who grew up near Buffalo, New York, who was convicted and put to death in connection with the 1995 Oklahoma City terrorist bombing, in which 168 people died.

== Personal life ==
With his wife Joyce, Herbeck has two sons. Chris and Richard Herbeck. He has a grandson named Everett Herbeck
