= Keith O'Neil =

American football player (born 1980)

No. 54, 53
- Position: Linebacker

Personal information
- Born: August 26, 1980 (age 46); Rochester, Michigan, U.S.

Career information
- High school: Sweet Home (NY)
- College: Northern Arizona
- NFL draft: 2003: undrafted

Career history
- Dallas Cowboys (2003–2005); Indianapolis Colts (2005–2007); New York Giants (2008)*
- * Offseason or practice squad member only

Awards and highlights
- Super Bowl champion (XLI); 2× All-Big Sky (2001, 2002)

Career NFL statistics
- Tackles: 75
- Forced fumbles: 1
- Fumble recoveries: 1
- Stats at Pro Football Reference

Keith Daniel O'Neil (born August 26, 1980) is an American former professional football player who was a linebacker in the National Football League (NFL) for the Dallas Cowboys and Indianapolis Colts. He earned a Super Bowl ring with the Colts in Super Bowl XLI as they beat the Chicago Bears. He played college football for the Northern Arizona Lumberjacks.

== Early life ==
O'Neil attended Sweet Home High School, where he played linebacker. As a senior, he received second-team All-state, All-conference and All-Western New York honors. He also ran track and played lacrosse.

He accepted a football scholarship from Northern Arizona University.

== Professional career ==
=== Dallas Cowboys ===
O'Neil was signed as an undrafted free agent by the Dallas Cowboys after the 2003 NFL draft. As a rookie, he registered 17 special teams tackles (second on the team).

In 2004, he remained a core special teams player (third on the team with 18 special teams) tackles and was the backup at weakside linebacker for Dexter Coakley.

On September 3, 2005, he was waived because the defense switched to a 3-4 alignment and he wasn't seen as a good fit for the new scheme.

=== Indianapolis Colts ===
O'Neil was claimed off waivers by the Indianapolis Colts on September 5, 2005. That year he registered 18 special teams tackles.

In 2006, he was inactive for 5 games with a high ankle sprain, he later suffered two fractured ribs and a sprained knee. He posted 14 special teams tackles and played in Super Bowl XLI. On July 30, 2007, he was placed on the Physically unable to perform list recovering from a sports hernia surgery. He suffered a chest injury in the second preseason game against the Chicago Bears. On August 26, he was placed on the injured reserve list and was eventually released.

=== New York Giants ===
On February 18, 2008, he was signed as a free agent by the New York Giants, after spending a year out of football. He decided to retire and was placed on the reserve/retired list on June 2.

== NFL career statistics ==
Legend
**Bold**	Career high

=== Regular season ===
Year	Team	Games		Tackles					Interceptions					Fumbles			
Year	Team	GP	GS	Cmb	Solo	Ast	Sck	TFL	Int	Yds	TD	Lng	PD	FF	FR	Yds	TD
2003	DAL	15	0	14	11	3	0.0	0	0	0	0	0	0	0	0	0	0
2004	DAL	**16**	0	14	12	2	0.0	0	0	0	0	0	0	0	**1**	0	0
2005	IND	11	0	**32**	**24**	**8**	0.0	**2**	0	0	0	0	0	**1**	0	0	0
2006	IND	10	0	15	14	1	0.0	0	0	0	0	0	0	0	0	0	0
		52	0	75	61	14	0.0	2	0	0	0	0	0	1	1	0	0

=== Playoffs ===
Year	Team	Games		Tackles					Interceptions					Fumbles			
Year	Team	GP	GS	Cmb	Solo	Ast	Sck	TFL	Int	Yds	TD	Lng	PD	FF	FR	Yds	TD
2003	DAL	1	0	1	1	0	0.0	0	0	0	0	0	0	0	0	0	0
2005	IND	1	0	1	1	0	0.0	0	0	0	0	0	0	0	0	0	0
2006	IND	**4**	0	**3**	**3**	0	0.0	0	0	0	0	0	0	0	0	0	0
		6	0	5	5	0	0.0	0	0	0	0	0	0	0	0	0	0

== Personal ==
O'Neil is the son of former NFL linebacker Ed O'Neil. O'Neil's brother Kevin, played football for Syracuse University. His brother-in-law Drew Haddad played wide receiver in the NFL. O’Neil has been diagnosed with bipolar disorder.

== Publications ==
=== Books ===
- Under My Helmet: A Football Player's Lifelong Battle with Bipolar Disorder, August 2017. ISBN 978-1510716865.
