= 1994 All-Big Ten Conference football team =

American college football all-star team

The 1994 All-Big Ten Conference football team consists of American football players chosen as All-Big Ten Conference players for the 1994 NCAA Division I-A football season.

== Offensive selections ==
=== Quarterbacks ===
- Kerry Collins, Penn State (AP-1)
- Todd Collins, Michigan (AP-2)

=== Running backs ===
- Ki-Jana Carter Penn State (AP-1)
- Chris Darkins, Minnesota (AP-1)
- Mike Alstott, Purdue (AP-2)
- Alex Smith, Indiana (AP-2)

=== Centers ===
- Cory Raymer, Wisconsin (AP-1)
- Bucky Greeley, Penn State (AP-2)

=== Guards ===
- Jeff Hartings, Penn State (AP-1)
- Joe Rudolph, Wisconsin (AP-1)
- Andrew Greene, Indiana (AP-2)
- Matt O'Dwyer, Northwestern (AP-2)

=== Tackles ===
- Korey Stringer, Ohio State (AP-1)
- Mike Verstegen, Wisconsin (AP-1)
- Shane Hannah, Michigan State (AP-2)
- Brian DeMarco, Michigan State (AP-2)

=== Tight ends ===
- Kyle Brady, Penn State (AP-1)
- Ken Dilger, Illinois (AP-2)

=== Receivers ===
- Bobby Engram, Penn State (AP-1)
- Amani Toomer, Michigan (AP-1)
- Joey Galloway, Ohio State (AP-2)
- Freddie Scott, Penn State (AP-2)

== Defensive selections ==
=== Defensive linemen ===
- Simeon Rice, Illinois (AP-1)
- Kevin Hardy, Illinois (AP-1)
- Matt Finkes, Ohio State (AP-1)
- Mike Thompson, Wisconsin (AP-1)
- Mike Vrabel, Ohio State (AP-1)
- Trent Zenkewicz, Michigan (AP-2)
- Todd Atkins, Penn State (AP-2)
- Parker Wildeman, Iowa (AP-2)
- Phil Yeboah-Kodie, Penn State (AP-2)
- Jason Maniecki, Wisconsin (AP-2)

=== Linebackers ===
- Dana Howard, Illinois (AP-1)
- Lorenzo Styles, Ohio State (AP-1)
- Steve Morrison, Michigan (AP-1)
- Brian Gelzheiser, Penn State (AP-2)
- John Holecek, Illinois (AP-2)
- Alfonzo Thurman, Indiana (AP-2)

=== Defensive backs ===
- Ty Law, Michigan (AP-1)
- Jeff Messenger, Wisconsin (AP-1)
- Brian Miller, Penn State (AP-1)
- Demetrice Martin, Michigan State (AP-2)
- Marlon Kemer, Ohio State (AP-2)
- Tony Pittman, Penn State (AP-2)

== Special teams ==
=== Kickers ===
- Remy Hamilton, Michigan (AP-1)
- Mike Chalberg, Minnesota (AP-2)

=== Punters ===
- Paul Burton, Northwestern (AP-1)
- Scott Terna, Ohio State (AP-2)

== Key ==
AP = Associated Press

== See also ==
- 1994 College Football All-America Team
