= Erik Blicker =

American musician (born 1964)

- Born: 1964 (age 61–62); New Haven, Connecticut, United States
- Occupations: Musician, composer, audio engineer, entrepreneur
- Instrument: Guitar

Erik Blicker is an American musician, composer, audio engineer and entrepreneur. He is a founding partner of Flavorlab, a full-service sound studio headquartered in New York City (Manhattan).

== Early life ==
Erik Blicker was born on November 7, 1964, in New Haven, Connecticut. He is one of four children of Fred and Jeanne Blicker. At a young age, Erik Blicker was encouraged to explore the world of music and quickly became hooked on recording as well as playing the guitar. At the age of 14 he started guitar lessons with Jim Shepley, a blues and rock musician who grew up with Duane Allman and is credited with inspiring the iconic Allman Brothers Band.

== Career ==
In 1997, Blicker met Glenn Schloss; they partnered up to form G&E Music. Their first gig was scoring a short-lived VH1 show, 100 Greatest Artists of Rock & Roll, starring Kevin Bacon as the host.

Working together on History Channel's Extreme History with Roger Daltrey, Blicker and Schloss composed the show's theme as well as mood music, completing music for more than 200 original tracks. They also created an Extreme History Library for the show to choose cuts from. On a show by show basis, Blicker and Schloss would create the score / music based on a description, mood, or vibe the producers were looking for, instead of based on the picture which is more standard. The theme song and score combine acoustic strums and picks with electronic grooves and beat box hits. According to the producers, "These guys got dirty, which is what the show was all about. We hear from a lot of people who dig the show and rave about the music."

Blicker then spearheaded the team in creating three albums of baseball highlight music dropping a heavy dose of Rock on ESPN's flagship show SportsCenter. "ESPN caught a sample arena rock anthem and hired G&E music to create an album's worth of big orchestral hard rock music. The ten-song library scores the sports story arc: the building tension of the pre-game, the kick-off and chase, the close competition and buzzer-beater victory, the sweeping defeat...it's all there, in revving Metallica-esque guitars and pounding drums filled out with orchestral strings and horns, and symphonic choirs." Blicker was specifically noted for rocking on the guitar, laying a foundation for the songs in spontaneous jam sessions. "From the up-tempo "Rise Up" with its wailing guitar to the determined-from-the-start "I Won't Let You Score," the G&E hard rock library puts ESPN in a whole lot of moody metal."

Working closely with filmmakers Dana Flor and Toby Oppenheimer, Blicker and G&E music created the emotional core of the soundtrack for the HBO documentary The Nine Lives of Marion Barry. "Musically, G&E created the overall mood of the film. They were so giving and worked tirelessly until we found that emotional center—the sounds that felt right and evoked those certain feelings we were looking for. And, they really hit that '60s and '70s funky soul sound, which was key." G&E kicked off the writing process with some live funk sessions, developing thematic elements that would course through the film score. The Nine Lives of Marion Barry led Blicker to create new and different-sounding instruments by electronically manipulating and bending organic sounds; the results were so unique he and Schloss completed an album and planned to release it under the name Ambient Gelly.

Working with Oppenheimer led Blicker to another project scoring music for The McVeigh Tapes for MSNBC. Blicker was challenged with creating a score that would set the mood for the chilling accounts of the Oklahoma City bombing, as told by Timothy McVeigh himself through never-before-heard audio interviews. The score had what Oppenheimer called "atmospheric tones that felt organic but also had momentum and groove." He continued, "[Blicker] finding interesting voices using reverbs and delays," working with Ableton Live and Spectrasonics Omnisphere as well as other production tools.

In 2004, Blicker and Schloss partnered with Brian Quill and evolved G&E Music to form Flavorlab. Under the Flavorlab brand, Blicker and Schloss composed a new theme song for ABC's The View that premiered on November 24, 2014.

In 2020, Blicker composed the score for Wild Card: The Downfall of a Radio Loudmouth on HBO documentary.

In 2021, EP & showrunner, Kadine Anckle, tapped Blicker & his partner, Glenn Schloss, to write the original score for Turning The Tables with Robin Roberts on Disney+.

In 2025 Blicker composed the soundtrack and Score for Original Sound

== Philanthropy ==
Blicker and Schloss have composed for the winner of the Mutual of America Life Insurance Community Partnership Award for over a decade. In 2020, they composed original score for 100 Scholars Robotics Alliance, part of the 100 Black Men of Atlanta. Other notable winners include Operation Rebound, an organization that won the 2012. Mutual of America chooses a community organization that makes a positive impact on society, and the prize is a documentary about them that they can use as a fundraising tool. Blicker worked with the filmmaker to compose the music for Operation Rebound, which provides adaptive sports equipment, sports prosthetics, training, mentoring and competition expenses for active duty service members, veterans and first responders who have suffered permanent physical injuries as a result of their service.
