= Dylan McDuffie =

American football player (born 2000)

No. 25 – Kansas Jayhawks
- Position: Running back
- Class: Redshirt Senior

Personal information
- Born: February 19, 2000 (age 26)
- Listed height: 6 ft 0 in (1.83 m)
- Listed weight: 220 lb (100 kg)

Career information
- High school: Sweet Home (Amherst, New York)
- College: Buffalo (2018–2021); Georgia Tech (2022); Kansas (2023–present)

Awards and highlights
- All-MAC Third Team (2021)
- Stats at ESPN

Dylan McDuffie (born February 19, 2000) is an American college football running back for the Kansas Jayhawks of the Big 12 Conference. In 2021, he was named to the All-MAC Second Team by Pro Football Network and All-MAC Third Team by the MAC Coaches and Pro Football Focus after rushing for over 1,000 yards and scoring 12 total touchdowns for the Bulls. In high school, he earned All-Western New York honors as both a running back (2016) and linebacker (2017), and was selected as a finalist for the 2016 Connolly Cup (awarded to the best high school football player in Western New York). In 2022, he entered his name into the transfer portal twice before deciding to transfer officially in April. He played the 2022–23 season for Georgia Tech Yellow Jackets football, starting the season in a committee situation before eventually falling out the rotation completely. After the season he decided to transfer to use his last year of eligibility as a grad transfer.

== Early life ==
Growing up in the Buffalo, New York area, McDuffie attended and played football at Sweet Home High School in Amherst, New York for his freshman, sophomore, and senior seasons. He transferred to Saint Francis High School in Athol Springs, New York for his junior season before returning to Sweet Home for his senior year. He played both running back on offense and linebacker on defense in high school, earning all-star recognition at each position.

In 2016, as a junior, he earned All-Western New York Second Team honors after accumulating 1,255 rushing yards, 25 receptions, 290 receiving yards, 14 rushing touchdowns, and three receiving touchdowns as he led Saint Francis to the Monsignor Martin final. Further, he was a 2016 Connolly Cup finalist (which was won by his cousin) and also named Western New York's best high school football player by the Riverside Athletic Club.

In the summer of 2017, between his junior and senior years, he was invited to and attended The Future Phenom Showcase and the Rivals 3 Stripe Camp, showcase camps for top high school players, held in New York and New Jersey, respectively.

In six games as a senior in 2017, he recorded 840 rushing yards, 14.4 yards per carry, 11 rushing touchdowns, and three receiving touchdowns, despite battling an ankle injury throughout the season. With a defensive performance that included 73 tackles, he earned a 2017 All-Western New York Honorable Mention selection as a linebacker.

In his high school career, McDuffie recorded 4,261 rushing yards and 54 touchdowns. In addition to the aforementioned awards and recognition, his high school career resume also included Catholic League MVP, All-Catholic First Team, WGRZ Offensive Player of the Year, and Ray Kearney Offensive MVP.

As a 247Sports three-star recruit prospect, and the No. 30 overall prospect in the state of New York, in the Class of 2018, he received over a dozen college football scholarship offers, in addition to interest from several other programs, including the University of Connecticut and Rutgers University, where he took unofficial visits. He ultimately committed to attend and play football for the University of Buffalo Bulls of the Mid-American Conference in Buffalo, New York.

McDuffie also ran track and played basketball in high school.

== College career ==
=== 2018–2020 ===
McDuffie started his college career at Buffalo by serving as a reserve to Jaret Patterson and Kevin Marks Jr. before his breakout 2021 season in which he earned the starting running back role.

In 2018, as a true freshman, he appeared in four games, recording 14 carries for 70 yards in a reserve role behind Patterson. McDuffie ultimately redshirted his freshman season. In 2019, he appeared in 10 games at running back and on special teams as a redshirt freshman. He ran for 150 yards and 6.5 yards per carry on 23 rushes, as well as scored a receiving touchdown. In 2020, he appeared in one game and logged one carry.

=== 2021 ===
McDuffie entered his redshirt junior season as the backup to Marks. However, after outperforming Marks in the early portion of the season, McDuffie took over Buffalo's starting running back role en route to a 1,000-yard and 11-touchdown season that earned him all-conference honors and garnered national attention.

He was named the MAC Offensive Player of the Week after his 143-yard, one-touchdown performance in Buffalo's Week 7 win over Ohio. Two weeks later, in Buffalo's game against Bowling Green, he ran for 166 yards on 34 carries, both career-highs, and two touchdowns, tying his career-high. On November 23, he eclipsed the 1,000-yard rushing mark on the season after rushing for 67 yards against Ball State.

He finished the 2021 season as the Bulls' leading rusher with 206 carries, 1,049 rushing yards, 123 receiving yards, 11 rushing touchdowns, and one receiving touchdown. With four 100-yard rushing games in 2021, he joined his uncle, Chris McDuffie, as one of only 23 Bulls players to record a 100-yard rushing game in program history since 1999. He ranked fourth in the MAC and 43rd in the nation in rushing yards, as well as sixth (tied) in the MAC and 46th (tied) in the nation in rushing touchdowns. He was named to the 2021 All-MAC Second Team by Pro Football Network (PFN) and All-MAC Third Team by both the MAC Coaches and Pro Football Focus.

Following the 2021 season, McDuffie entered the transfer portal, becoming the "second high-profile player" (joining quarterback Kyle Vantrease) from Buffalo to enter the portal. However, on January 31, 2022, after considering offers from California, Oregon, and Oklahoma, he withdrew his name from the transfer portal, and will return to Buffalo for his redshirt senior 2022 season as the team's starting running back.

=== 2022 ===
In 2022, McDuffie transferred to Georgia Tech. In week 2 against Western Carolina he carried the ball for a season high eight carries for 25 yards and a touchdown. McDuffie ended the season with 45 rushing yards on 22 carries.

=== 2023 ===
McDuffie transferred again to Kansas where he would be reunited with former Buffalo head coach Lance Leipold. In his first game as a Jayhawk, he would rush for 40 yards on six carries and one touchdown against Missouri State. In week 6, McDuffie would rush for a season high 91 yards on 13 carries and two touchdowns against Central Florida.

=== Statistics ===
| Year | Team | GP | Rushing | | | | | Receiving | | | | |
| Year | Team | GP | Att | Yds | Avg | Lng | TD | Rec | Yds | Avg | Lng | TD |
|---|---|---|---|---|---|---|---|---|---|---|---|---|
| 2018 | Buffalo | 4 | 14 | 70 | 5.0 | 13 | 0 | 0 | 0 | 0.0 | 0 | 0 |
| 2019 | Buffalo | 10 | 23 | 150 | 6.5 | 21 | 0 | 3 | 25 | 8.3 | 13 | 1 |
| 2020 | Buffalo | 3 | 1 | 4 | 4.0 | 4 | 0 | 0 | 0 | 0.0 | 0 | 0 |
| 2021 | Buffalo | 12 | 206 | 1,049 | 5.1 | 58 | 11 | 14 | 123 | 8.8 | 27 | 1 |
| 2022 | Georgia Tech | 8 | 22 | 45 | 2.0 | 9 | 1 | 5 | 33 | 6.6 | 9 | 0 |
| 2023 | Kansas | 12 | 41 | 227 | 5.5 | 36 | 4 | 0 | 0 | 0.0 | 0 | 0 |
| Career | | 49 | 307 | 1,545 | 5.0 | 58 | 16 | 22 | 181 | 8.2 | 27 | 2 |

== Personal life ==
Three of McDuffie's uncles (Chris, Steve, and Ted McDuffie) also played football at Buffalo. Ted was the Bulls' leading tackler (98), as well as recorded the most passes defended (10), for the 1997 season. He is pursuing a bachelor's degree in social science interdisciplinary studies. He is first cousins with Green Bay Packers inside linebacker, Isaiah McDuffie.

In December 2021, he hosted a holiday toy drive, in conjunction with the Boys and Girls Club of Buffalo, to benefit local children and families. Per an interview with ABC 7 WKBW Buffalo, he cited the time he spent at various Boys and Girls Clubs in Buffalo as a child as driving factor behind his decision to host the event.
