= Drew Haddad =

American football player (born 1978)

No. 84, 86
- Position: Wide receiver

Personal information
- Born: August 15, 1978 (age 48); Westlake, Ohio, U.S.

Career information
- High school: Saint Ignatius (Cleveland, Ohio)
- College: Buffalo
- NFL draft: 2000: 7th round, 233rd overall pick

Career history
- Buffalo Bills (2000)*; Indianapolis Colts (2000–2002); Frankfurt Galaxy (2004); Buffalo Bills (2004); San Diego Chargers (2005)
- * Offseason or practice squad member only

Awards and highlights
- Second-team All-MAC (1999)

Career NFL statistics
- Games played: 2
- Receptions: 1
- Receiving yards: 11
- Return yards: 19
- Stats at Pro Football Reference

Andrew George Haddad (born August 15, 1978) is an American former professional football player who was a wide receiver in the National Football League (NFL) for the Indianapolis Colts and Buffalo Bills. He finished his career with the San Diego Chargers. He played college football for the Buffalo Bulls before being selected with the 25th pick of the 7th round in the 2000 NFL draft by the Buffalo Bills.

== Early life and college ==
Haddad was born in Ohio to George P. and Joyce A. Haddad. He is of Lebanese descent.

He played high school football at Saint Ignatius High School in Cleveland where he was teammates with Dan O'Leary and Chris Hovan. He graduated in 1996. Haddad was a wide receiver and kick returner at Ignatius and helped lead the team to three Ohio high school football championships and two High School Football National Championships; the team only lost one game in his three years playing on the varsity team. He also earned two varsity letters in basketball and track and field. He was inducted into the school's athletics hall of fame in 2019.

Several college football programs including Miami University, Bowling Green, Villanova and Youngstown State recruited Haddad to play defensive back because they felt that he did not have the skills necessary to be a receiver. He instead accepted a scholarship offer from the University at Buffalo. As a freshman, Haddad played in every game for the Bulls. As a sophomore, he set a school record with 67 catches and tied that record the following year. As a senior, he again set a record for receptions in a single season. In addition to that record, he ended his time at Buffalo as the all-time school leader in total receptions, total receiving yards, total all-purpose yards, total punt return yards and single-season receiving yards. In the fall of 2007 he was inducted into the University at Buffalo's Athletic Hall of Fame.

== Professional career ==
The Buffalo Bills selected Haddad in the seventh round of the 2000 NFL draft. He signed with the Bills on or about July 17, 2000

In 2004, Haddad played for the Frankfurt Galaxy of NFL Europe. He led the team with 28 receptions and 455 receiving yards and 8 touchdowns

That June, the Buffalo Bills signed Haddad as a free agent.

On October 24, 2004, He appeared in that day's game for the Buffalo Bills against the Baltimore Ravens but did not accumulate any stats. The Bills released Haddad on September 3, 2005.

On December 20, 2005, Haddad signed with the San Diego Chargers.

== Personal life ==
Haddad married Colleen E. O'Neil in March 2002 in Buffalo and had their wedding reception at UB's Center for the Arts. Haddad met Colleen while she was a student at Buffalo State College and her father, Ed O'Neil, was coaching at Buffalo. Haddad is Catholic.

Haddad's father-in-law, Ed O'Neil, was picked by the Detroit Lions in the first round of the 1974 NFL draft. His brother-in-law, Keith O'Neil also played in the NFL. Keith later wrote that he looked up to Haddad when he, like Haddad, was a high school football player struggling to attract the attention of college football recruiters.

His brother, Eric, played fullback at Purdue. He has a son, Cody Haddad, who is committed to the Ohio State University in the class of 2025.
