= Sweet Home High School (Amherst, New York) =

Public school in Amherst, New York, US

Location
- 1901 Sweet Home Road; Amherst, New York 14228; United States; 43.01021°N 78.79751°W

Information
- Type: Public
- Established: 1968
- Principal: Joseph Lucenti (Acting)
- Teaching staff: 91.68 (FTE)
- Enrollment: 1,105 (2024-2025)
- Student to teacher ratio: 12.05
- Mascot: Panther
- Colors: Blue and Gold
- Website: https://shhs.sweethomeschools.org/

Sweet Home High School (SHHS), sometimes called Sweet Home Senior High, is a New York State public high school located at 1901 Sweet Home Road in Amherst, New York. Sweet Home High School educates students in grades 9 through 12 and is one of seven schools in the Sweet Home Central School District. The district consists of one High School, one Middle School, four Elementary schools (Glendale, Heritage Heights, Maplemere, and Willow Ridge), and one Alternative School (Dexter Terrace). Nearly 4,000 students are enrolled in the District's seven schools.

In 2005, Sweet Home High school was listed at number 810 by Newsweek in their list of "The 1,000 Top U.S. Schools".

== Music ==
Sweet Home has many music programs that includes Jazz Ensemble, Percussion Ensemble, Symphonic Band, Wind Ensemble, Chamber Orchestra, Concert Orchestra, Symphony Orchestra, Concert Chorale, Mixed Chorus and the annual musical.

== Athletics ==
The school offers and competes competitively in a number of sports, including Football, Basketball, Baseball, Ice Hockey, Lacrosse, Cross Country, Field Hockey, Golf, Gymnastics, Soccer, Swimming, Tennis, Volleyball, Masterminds (A team based trivia game), Chess, Cheerleading, Bowling, Track and Field, Softball, and Wrestling.

=== Volleyball ===
One of the most notable accomplishments of a Sweet Home athletics team is a streak of 292 undefeated games by the girls volleyball team. The streak lasted a span of eight seasons from 1978–1987 and set a National Federation of High School record for consecutive wins.

=== Football ===
Football is a major sport at Sweet Home. The Sweet Home Panthers varsity football team has won the Section 6 Class A Championship nine times since 2002, in the years 2002, 2007–2012, 2014, and 2024. The team has also won two New York State Championships, in 2008 and 2009.

=== Track & Field ===
The Sweet Home Panthers men's varsity indoor track and field team has won the Section VI Indoor Team Championship 10 times: in 1985, 1989, 1995, 2017–2020, and 2023–2025. The school has also had individual state champions, including Brenton Baker, who won consecutive NYSPHSAA boys' high jump championships in 2023 and 2024. The program has recorded achievements in sprinting, jumping, and relay events..

The Sweet Home High School boys' outdoor Track & Field team is also a cherished sport at Sweet Home. Sweet Home won consecutive ECIC team championships in 2013 and 2014 and has produced several state champions. Nathaniel Davis for the 200-meter dash in 2017, and was also a member of the 4x100 relay team that won state championships that season. In 2025, Brenton Baker won the NYSPHSAA Class B long jump championship and joined Alex Jemison, DaMari Yancey and Niear Patterson on Sweet Home's Class B state-champion 4x100 meter relay team.

Many members of Sweet Home High School's boys' track and field program have continued their athletic careers at the NCAA and NAIA levels:

- Brenton Baker, North Carolina A&T State University, Sprints and jumps
- Cole Cammarata, Southeastern University, Throws
- Dominic Croce, Mercyhurst University, Throws
- Nathaniel Davis, Indiana University, Sprints and jumps
- Zephrym Grover, SUNY Morrisville, Distance
- Alexander Martin, SUNY Brockport, Sprints
- Caleb Nickens, University at Buffalo, Throws
- Christopher Nowak, University at Buffalo, Distance
- Matthew Penberthy, SUNY Brockport, Distance
- Raymond Sambrotto, University of Massachusetts Amherst, Distance
- Dan Syracuse, Canisus College, Distance and cross country

== Notable alumni ==
- William Conrad III, member of the New York State Assembly
- Vincent Gallo - actor and film director
- Dan Herbeck - Buffalo News reporter, author
- KEYZBABY - record producer, songwriter
- John Marciano - Emmy-winning and Grammy-nominated film producer,
- Dylan McDuffie - college football running back
- "Baby" Joe Mesi - heavyweight boxer
- Keith O'Neil - NFL Linebacker
- Laura Pedersen - fiction author, columnist
- Reggie Witherspoon - former head basketball coach
