= American Terrorist =

Biographical book

- Dust jacket from the hardcover edition
- Author: Lou Michel and Dan Herbeck
- Language: English
- Subject: Biography
- Published: April 3, 2001, Harper
- Publication place: United States
- Media type: Hardcover
- Pages: 426
- ISBN: 0-06-039407-2

American Terrorist: Timothy McVeigh & The Oklahoma City Bombing (2001) is a book by Buffalo, New York journalists Lou Michel and Dan Herbeck that chronicles the life of Timothy McVeigh from his childhood in Pendleton, New York, to his military experiences in the Gulf War, to his preparations for and carrying out of the Oklahoma City bombing, to his trial and death row experience. One of the appendices lists all 168 people killed in the blast, along with brief biographical information. (There were plans to include a chapter about his execution in the softcover edition.) It is the only biography authorized by McVeigh himself, and was based on 75 hours of interviews that the authors had with McVeigh. McVeigh was said to be pleased overall with the book, but disappointed with the way he was portrayed and the explanation of his motive. Co-author Michel said he viewed McVeigh as a "human being with a limited range of feelings in the areas of empathy and sympathy and with an oversized sense of rage and resentment."

According to Salon, McVeigh is portrayed in the book as an extremist:

He hates and fears the federal government, worships guns, fetishizes "liberty" (defined in almost purely negative terms, as freedom from external interference of any kind), embraces survivalism and sees himself as having acted in a proud American tradition of resistance to tyranny that goes back to the Founders. Throw in belief in the gold standard, certainty that a U.N.-run "New World Order" is poised to take over the world, racial resentment and an obsessive fixation on Ruby Ridge and Waco as proof that federal agents are jackbooted thugs waiting to make their final move, and the ... portrait is complete.

— Gary Kamiya, Salon

On April 19, 2010, a two-hour special, the "McVeigh Tapes", narrated by Rachel Maddow, was aired by MSNBC as part of the 15th anniversary of the bombing. The program was criticized as providing a forum for McVeigh to air his viewpoints, and as blunting the effect of McVeigh's cold statements with flashy, computer generated images.
