= Doug Allen (American football) =

American football player (born 1951)

No. 59
- Position: Linebacker

Personal information
- Born: November 13, 1951 (age 74); Tampa, Florida, U.S.
- Listed height: 6 ft 2 in (1.88 m)
- Listed weight: 228 lb (103 kg)

Career information
- High school: West (Painted Post, New York)
- College: Penn State (1969–1973)
- NFL draft: 1974: 2nd round, 27th overall pick

Career history
- Buffalo Bills (1974–1975)

Awards and highlights
- Second-team All-East (1973)

Career NFL statistics
- Sacks: 2
- Fumble recoveries: 3
- Interceptions: 1
- Stats at Pro Football Reference

Douglas Ferguson Allen (born November 13, 1951) is an American former professional football player who was a linebacker for two seasons with the Buffalo Bills of the National Football League (NFL). He was selected by the Bills in the second round of the 1974 NFL draft after playing college football for the Penn State Nittany Lions.

== Early life ==
Douglas Ferguson Allen was born on November 13, 1951, in Tampa, Florida. He attended Corning Painted Post West High School in Painted Post, New York.

== College career ==
Allen was a member of the Penn State Nittany Lions of Pennsylvania State University from 1969 to 1973. He was a letterman in 1970, 1972, and 1973. He was a starter on Penn State's undefeated 1973 team. He was named second-team All-East by the Associated Press that season.

== Professional career ==
Allen was selected by the Buffalo Bills in the second round, with the 27th overall pick, of the 1974 NFL draft and by the Jacksonville Sharks in the 23rd round, with the 267th overall pick, of the 1974 WFL draft. He signed with the Bills on March 1, 1974. He played in all 14 games, starting eight, for the Bills in 1974, recording two sacks, two fumble recoveries, and one interception. He also appeared in, and started, one playoff game that year. Allen played in all 14 games for the second consecutive season, starting five, in 1975 and recovered one fumble. He became a free agent after the season.

== Personal life ==
Allen initially worked for the AFL-CIO after his NFL career. He was later the assistant executive director of the NFL Players Association from 1982 to 2007. He also spent time as the national executive director and chief negotiator for the Screen Actors Guild. Allen was a professor in labor and employment relations at Penn State as well.
