= Robert Mitinger =

American football player (born 1940)

Bob Mitinger
No. 82, 67
- Position: Linebacker

Personal information
- Born: February 13, 1940; Greensburg, Pennsylvania, U.S.
- Died: September 27, 2004 (aged 64); State College, Pennsylvania, U.S.
- Listed height: 6 ft 2 in (1.88 m)
- Listed weight: 232 lb (105 kg)

Career information
- High school: Greensburg Salem
- College: Penn State
- NFL draft: 1962: 3rd round, 29th overall pick
- AFL draft: 1962: 5th round, 34th overall pick

Career history

Playing
- San Diego Chargers (1962–1964, 1966, 1968)

Coaching
- Army (1967) Freshmen

Awards and highlights
- AFL champion (1963); First-team All-American (1961); First-team All-Eastern (1961); Second-team All-Eastern (1960)
- Stats at Pro Football Reference

Other information
- Military career
- Allegiance: United States
- Branch: U.S. Army
- Service years: 1966–1967

Robert Bray Mitinger (Pronounced: MIGHT-in-ger) (February 13, 1940 – September 25, 2004) was an American professional football player for the San Diego Chargers of the American Football League (NFL). After his football career, he became an attorney and civic leader.

== Early life ==
Mitinger attended Greensburg-Salem High School in Greensburg, Pennsylvania.

== College career ==
At Penn State, Mitinger was a two-way All-American player—the consummate 60-minute man, playing tight end and defensive end for Nittany Lions head coach, Rip Engle. He was part of the Penn State team that upset No. 10-ranked Alabama in the 1959 Liberty Bowl—the school's first bowl victory.

He also helped Penn State to victories over Oregon in the 1960 Liberty Bowl and No. 13-ranked Georgia Tech (30–15) in the 1961 Gator Bowl and was selected to compete in the 1962 Hula Bowl.

After Penn State defeated Cal 30–15 in 1962, Cal coach Marv Levy called Mitinger "the best college football player in the United States".

Mitinger was a member of the Sigma Alpha Epsilon fraternity at Penn State, class of 1962.

== Professional career ==
Although drafted in the third-round by the National Football League's Washington Redskins, the 6 ft 2 in (1.88 m), 235 lb., Mitinger chose instead to sign with the San Diego Chargers of the upstart American Football League.

He was named the 1962 Chargers' team Rookie of the Year.

He played 42 games at linebacker for the Chargers for seven seasons (1962–1964, 1966, 1968), including their 51–10 rout of the Boston Patriots at Balboa Stadium in the 1963 AFL championship, the high point of the team's 44-year history.

Mitinger's pro career was interrupted by a stint in the United States Army from 1966 to 1967. Stationed at West Point, New York, he coached the Army freshman football team. In 1968, he returned to the Chargers for his final season.

== After football ==
In 1966, Mitinger earned a law degree at the University of San Diego, which he attended in the AFL off-season, and for the 1968 and 1969 seasons worked with the players' union (the AFL Players Association) as their attorney. In 1970, he returned to State College, Pennsylvania, where he practiced law for 30 years, starting his own law firm in 1984. He was also an instructor of business and real estate law at Penn State University from 1971 to 1994.

== Personal life ==
Mitinger lost his AFL championship ring while attending law school. In 1999, a Chula Vista, California, man discovered the ring in his deceased mother's jewelry box and placed an ad on eBay, seeking to contact Mitinger. His mother had been a member of the law school's maintenance staff and had found the ring in the drain of the school's swimming pool. The appearance of the ring on the auction site led to the eventual return of the ring. "It renews my faith in humanity", Mitinger told The San Diego Union-Tribune.

He died September 27, 2004, at the Mount Nittany Medical Center in State College, Pennsylvania, from complications from stomach cancer. He was 64.

The Robert B. Mitinger Award, named in his honor, is presented to Penn State Nittany Lions football players who personify courage, character and social responsibility. It was first awarded in 2004.

== See also ==
- List of American Football League players
