= Little Finnup House =

Historic house in Kansas, United States

- U.S. National Register of Historic Places
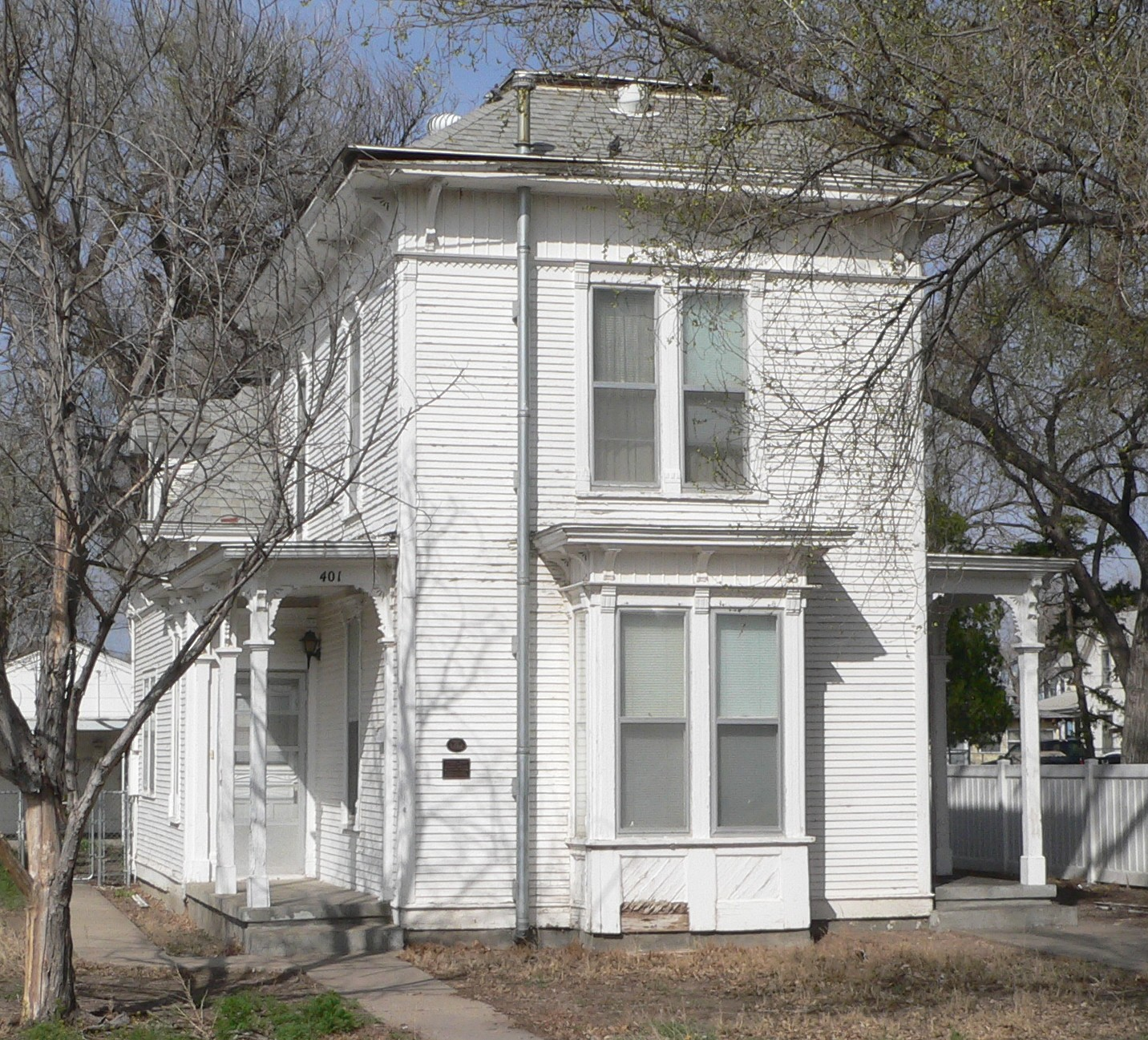

- Location within Kansas Location within the United States
- Location: 401 N. Ninth St., Garden City, Kansas
- Coordinates: 37°58′07″N 100°52′36″W
- Area: less than one acre
- Built: 1886
- Architectural style: Italianate
- NRHP reference No.: 00000155
- Added to NRHP: March 9, 2000

The Little Finnup House, located at 401 N. Ninth St. in Garden City, Kansas, was built in 1886. It was listed on the National Register of Historic Places in 2000.

It is a two-story Italianate-style structure with a front-facing T-Plan.

It was deemed notable "for its historical association with George W. Finnup, a member of Garden City's most prominent pioneer family, businessman, community leader and philanthropist (1866 -1937) and for its architectural significance as an Italianate style house."
