= Kyle Brady =

American football player (born 1972)

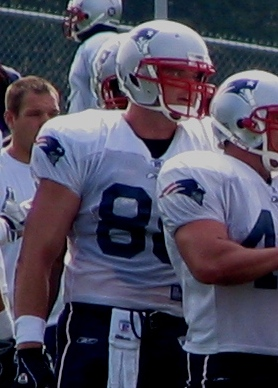
- Brady with the New England Patriots in 2007

No. 81, 88, 80
- Position: Tight end

Personal information
- Born: January 14, 1972 (age 54); Camp Hill, Pennsylvania, U.S.
- Listed height: 6 ft 6 in (1.98 m)
- Listed weight: 280 lb (127 kg)

Career information
- High school: Cedar Cliff (Camp Hill)
- College: Penn State (1990–1994)
- NFL draft: 1995: 1st round, 9th overall pick

Career history
- New York Jets (1995–1998); Jacksonville Jaguars (1999–2006); New England Patriots (2007)

Awards and highlights
- First-team All-American (1994); First-team All-Big Ten (1994); Second-team All-Big Ten (1993)

Career NFL statistics
- Receptions: 343
- Receiving yards: 3,519
- Receiving touchdowns: 25
- Stats at Pro Football Reference

Kyle James Brady (born January 14, 1972) is an American former professional football player who was a tight end for 13 seasons in the National Football League (NFL) for the New York Jets, Jacksonville Jaguars, and New England Patriots. He played college football for the Penn State Nittany Lions, earning first-team All-American honors in 1994. He was the Jets' first round draft choice in the 1995 NFL draft.

== Early life ==
Brady attended Highland Elementary School, Lemoyne Middle School, and Cedar Cliff High School, all in the West Shore School District. While attending Cedar Cliff in Camp Hill, Pennsylvania, Brady lettered in football, basketball, and baseball. In football, he was a first-team USA Today All-USA selection, a Parade Magazine All-America selection and, as a senior, was the Gatorade Pennsylvania Player of the Year, and the recipient of the Bobby Dodd Award (which is given to the nation's top offensive lineman) given by the Touchdown Club of Atlanta. In Brady's Junior season at Cedar Cliff he scored the lone touchdown in a 14–7 loss to Pittsburgh Central Catholic in the 1988 Pennsylvania State AAAA Championship game played at Penn State University.

== College career ==
At Penn State, Brady was a two-time All-Big Ten selection, and a consensus All-America choice as a senior, catching 27 passes for 365 yards and 2 touchdowns. During his senior year in 1994, he helped his team to an undefeated record, a conference championship, and the school's first Rose Bowl victory. Although Paterno continued to push for back up TE Chiefa, he was ranked seventh in the all-time reception list for the school. Brady finished his four seasons with 76 receptions for 940 yards and 9 touchdowns. He graduated with a degree in exercise and sports science in 1995.

== Professional career ==
Pre-draft measurables
Height	Weight	Arm length	Hand span	40-yard dash	10-yard split	20-yard split	20-yard shuttle	Vertical jump	Broad jump	Bench press
6 ft 6 3/8 in (1.99 m)	258 lb (117 kg)	33 1/2 in (0.85 m)	9 1/2 in (0.24 m)	4.84 s	1.70 s	2.81 s	4.21 s	35.0 in (0.89 m)	10 ft 0 in (3.05 m)	18 reps
All values from NFL Combine

=== New York Jets ===
Brady was selected by the New York Jets in the first round (9th overall) of the 1995 NFL draft, much to the chagrin of the Jets fans in attendance. The fans wanted the team to draft future Hall of Famer Warren Sapp and showed it by chanting "We want Sapp! We want Sapp!". After Brady was announced, Joe Theismann said "It just doesn't seem to make sense", speculating that Rich Kotite wanted two tight ends on the field. Jets fans booed Brady and his mother when they appeared on the stage. Although Brady became what NFL Films later described as a "solid player", fans did not forget the team not choosing Sapp.

=== Jacksonville Jaguars ===
Brady went on to sign with the Jacksonville Jaguars in 1999 and had his best year in the NFL with the Jaguars. In the 2000 season, he set career highs with 64 receptions and 729 receiving yards. He was the Jaguars' Man of the Year in 2003. Brady had a reputation with the Jags as a very durable player, having only missed nine games in his twelve seasons in the NFL, and was also known as an outstanding blocker.

=== New England Patriots ===
His reputation as a durable blocker helped him to land a two-year contract on March 3, 2007, with the New England Patriots to replace departing free agent Daniel Graham at tight end. Bill Belichick had wanted to draft Brady in 1995 as head coach of the Cleveland Browns with the 10th pick. When Brady was selected, Belichick traded down to the 30th pick. One website went as far as to label Brady "Belichick's white whale."

Despite nagging injuries, Brady played in 14 games for the Patriots in 2007, catching nine passes for 70 yards and two touchdowns, culminating with Super Bowl XLII. He was released by New England on February 29, 2008, and retired shortly thereafter.

== NFL career statistics ==
Legend
**Bold**	Career high

=== Regular season ===
Year	Team	Games		Receiving					
Year	Team	GP	GS	Tgt	Rec	Yds	Avg	Lng	TD
1995	NYJ	15	11	53	26	252	9.7	29	2
1996	NYJ	**16**	**16**	31	15	144	9.6	25	1
1997	NYJ	**16**	14	35	22	238	10.8	24	2
1998	NYJ	**16**	15	50	30	315	10.5	35	**5**
1999	JAX	13	12	46	32	346	10.8	30	1
2000	JAX	**16**	15	**94**	**64**	**729**	**11.4**	36	3
2001	JAX	**16**	**16**	63	36	386	10.7	20	2
2002	JAX	**16**	**16**	67	43	461	10.7	**42**	4
2003	JAX	**16**	15	46	29	281	9.7	26	1
2004	JAX	11	8	23	14	103	7.4	21	1
2005	JAX	**16**	14	26	18	157	8.7	33	1
2006	JAX	**16**	14	8	5	37	7.4	13	0
2007	NE	14	9	16	9	70	7.8	20	2
Career		197	175	558	343	3,519	10.3	42	25

=== Playoffs ===
Year	Team	Games		Receiving					
Year	Team	GP	GS	Tgt	Rec	Yds	Avg	Lng	TD
1998	NYJ	2	**2**	5	3	28	**9.3**	**17**	0
1999	JAX	2	1	**7**	**5**	**44**	8.8	**17**	**1**
2005	JAX	1	1	2	1	1	1.0	1	0
2007	NE	**3**	**2**	3	2	15	7.5	12	0
		8	6	17	11	88	8.0	17	1

== Broadcasting ==
Brady was a participant in the NFL Business Management and Entrepreneurial Program, a two-week program held at the top American business schools for NFL players preparing for careers after football. Brady attended the workshop at the Wharton School of the University of Pennsylvania in February and March 2008. In June 2009, Brady took part in the 2009 NFL/NFLPA "Broadcast Boot Camp," a program designed by the NFL Broadcasting Department and their broadcast partners to prepare players for possible post-playing careers in broadcasting.

Brady was an analyst for NFL Europe before being hired by the Big Ten Network as a football analyst for the 2009 season, where he was partnered with Rick Pizzo on the Big Ten Football Saturday: Pre-Game Show.

== Law ==
Brady became a licensed financial advisor in 2009 and worked at First Florida Credit Union before enrolling at the Florida Coastal School of Law in Jacksonville, Florida, in 2010. He graduated in May 2013, interned with Holland & Knight, and passed the bar later that year. He planned to use his combined financial and legal training to advise former NFL players on how to avoid financial pitfalls, along with real estate, securities law and estate planning.

== Personal life ==
Brady resides in Neptune Beach, Florida with his wife, Aubrey, and his four children; Kellen (b. March 2005), Brooke (b. August 2007), Blair (b. May 2013), and JJ (b. June 2025).

Brady's father John Brady was born in Chadwell Heath, Romford, Essex, UK. He played Minor League Baseball for two seasons.

Brady traced his Irish roots to Ballinagh co. Cavan, Turlough Co. Mayo and Tierneevin and Ballingarry Co. Galway.

His grandfather, great-grandfather and great-great-grandfather were members of the Royal Irish Constabulary.

A 2004 Sports Illustrated article noted Brady is a U.S. Civil War buff.

In 2004 Brady earned his pilot's license. Brady flies a Cirrus SR-22 airplane.

On March 21, 2009, he threw out the first pitch at opening day ceremonies for the Green Cove Springs Athletic Association Little League Baseball. He served as honorary chairman of the 2009 Big 33 Football Classic.

In May 2013, he earned his Juris Doctor degree from Florida Coastal School of Law. Brady currently owns his own business practicing real estate law.

On June 24, 2014, he was selected as honorary chairman for the Global Ireland Football Tournament.
