= Tony Pittman =

American football player (born 1971)

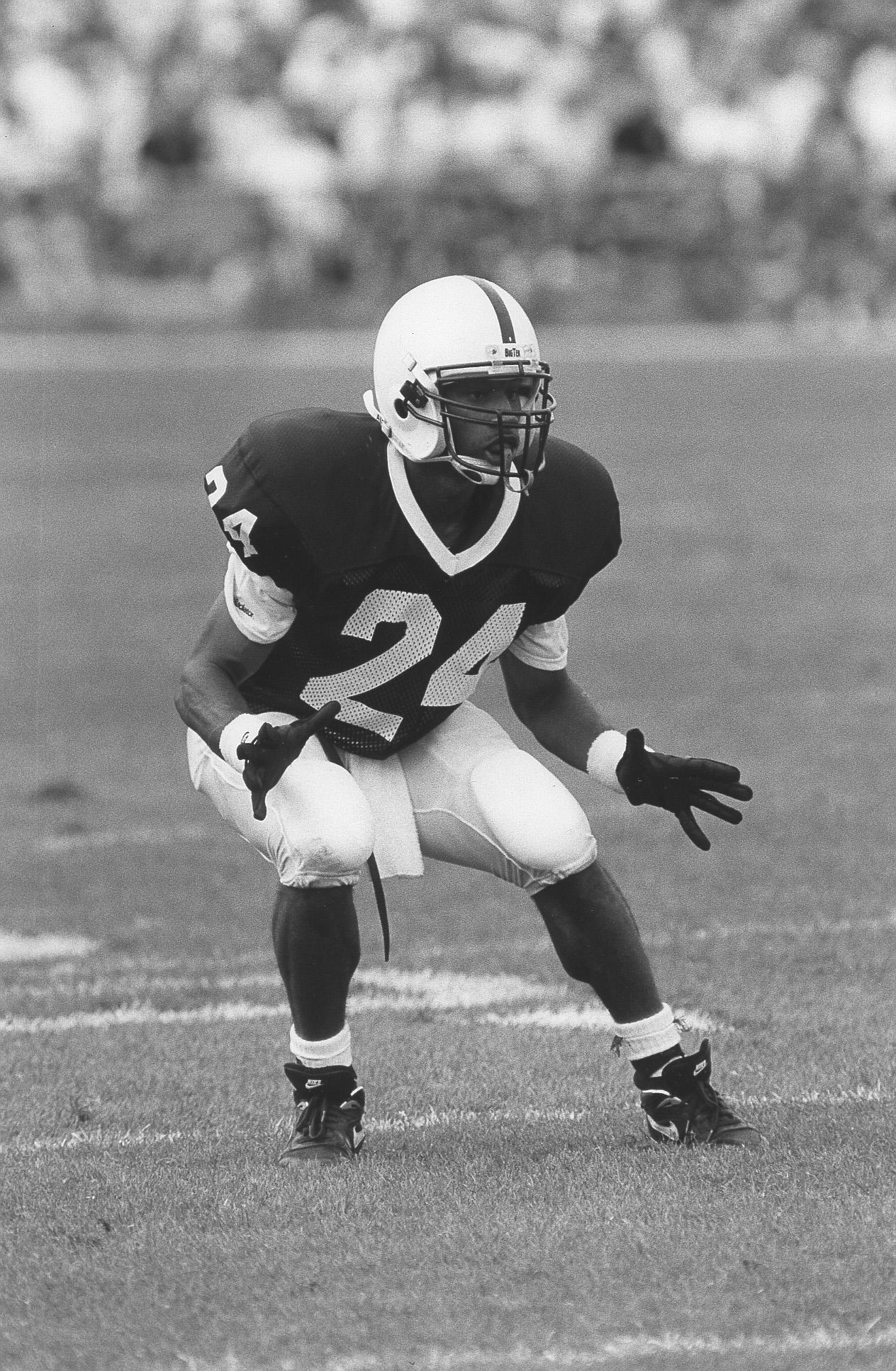
- Pittman in action at Beaver Stadium for the Penn State Nittany Lions

Profile
- Position: CB

Personal information
- Born: August 5, 1971 (age 55); Baltimore, Maryland, U.S.
- Listed height: 5 ft 8 in (1.73 m)
- Listed weight: 178 lb (81 kg)

Career information
- College: Penn State

Awards and highlights
- Second-team All-Big Ten (1994)

Charles Anthony Pittman (born August 5, 1971) is an American former college football player. He was a second-team All-Big Ten cornerback at Penn State after graduating from Phillips Academy in 1990. Pittman grew up in Erie, Pennsylvania and also attended McDowell High School, where he would have been in the 1989 graduation class had he not transferred to Phillips Academy.

== Collegiate career ==
Recruited out of Phillips Academy in Andover, Massachusetts, Pittman was a member of Joe Paterno's 1990 recruiting class. Pittman led the Nittany Lions in interceptions in 1993 with five and started all twelve games at cornerback for the undefeated Rose Bowl championship team in 1994.

Pittman was the 1993 recipient of the Jim O'Hora Award. Each year, the award is presented to a defensive Penn State Nittany Lions football player for "exemplary conduct, loyalty, interest, attitude, and improvement" during spring practice each year.

== Family ==
Pittman's father Charlie Pittman starred as an All-American running back on the undefeated Penn State teams of 1968-1969.

Neither Tony Pittman nor Charlie Pittman ever lost a game they started while at Penn State. Their combined college records were 45-0-1. New York Giants general manager Ernie Accorsi noted, “it’s unprecedented; it’s hard to believe that record for a father and son at the same university—and the son played in the Big Ten—that is something mind-boggling.”

== Personal ==
In 2007, he and his father Charliewrote Playing for Paterno, ISBN 1-60078-000-8, about their shared experiences as the first father/son to play for the coach.

Pittman and co-host Phil Collins (a former teammate) created, produced and hosted "The Penn State Football Podcast" from 2005 - 2013.
