= James Rosecrans =

American football player (1953–2022)

No. 52
- Position: Linebacker

Personal information
- Born: January 13, 1953; Asheville, North Carolina, U.S.
- Died: December 22, 2022 (aged 69); Port Charlotte, Florida, U.S.
- Listed height: 6 ft 1 in (1.85 m)
- Listed weight: 230 lb (104 kg)

Career information
- High school: West Genesee
- College: Penn State
- NFL draft: 1976: undrafted

Career history
- New York Jets (1976)
- Stats at Pro Football Reference

James Edward Rosecrans (January 13, 1953 – December 22, 2022) was an American football linebacker. He played one game for the New York Jets of the National Football League (NFL) in 1976. He played college football at Penn State University.

Rosecrans died on December 22, 2022, at the age of 69.
