= Charlie Pittman =

American football player (born 1948)

No. 28, 42
- Position: Running back

Personal information
- Born: January 22, 1948 (age 78); Baltimore, Maryland, U.S.
- Listed height: 6 ft 1 in (1.85 m)
- Listed weight: 200 lb (91 kg)

Career information
- College: Penn State
- NFL draft: 1970: 3rd round, 58th overall pick

Career history
- St. Louis Cardinals (1970); Baltimore Colts (1971); Green Bay Packers (1972)*
- * Offseason or practice squad member only

Awards and highlights
- First-team All-American (1969); First-team All-East (1968)

Career NFL statistics
- Rushing attempts: 4
- Rushing yards: 7
- Return yards: 567
- Stats at Pro Football Reference

Charles Vernon Pittman (born January 22, 1948) is an American former professional football player who was a running back in the National Football League (NFL). He played college football as a halfback for the Penn State Nittany Lions, earning All-American honors in 1969. He and played in the NFL for the St. Louis Cardinals and the Baltimore Colts.

== Collegiate career ==
Recruited out of Edmondson High School in Baltimore, Maryland, Pittman was a member of Joe Paterno's first recruiting class as head coach. A crafty, oversized running back on defensive-minded teams, he rushed for 2,236 yards and 30 touchdowns in his career with the Nittany Lions. In his junior and senior seasons, Penn State went 22–0, with wins over Kansas and Missouri in the 1969 and 1970 Orange Bowls.

Pittman led the Nittany Lions in rushing in 1969 with 706 yards and 10 touchdowns on 149 carries, caught 10 passes for 127 yards and topped the team in scoring with 66 points. He was named All-American following the 1969 season and was selected by the St. Louis Cardinals in the third round of the 1970 NFL draft (#58 overall).

== Father/son connections ==
Conversely, Pittman's son Tony Pittman starred as an undersized defensive back on the high-powered offense of the 1994 Penn State Nittany Lions football team.

Father and son were both starters for the Nittany Lions. Despite playing on three of Joe Paterno's five undefeated teams, both were denied national championships that could have been awarded their teams, but were given to other squads.

Charlie Pittman never lost a game he started in high school and neither he nor Tony ever lost a game they started at Penn State. Their combined college records are 45–0–1. Both father Charlie and son Tony Pittman were also academic all-Americans while attending and playing football for Penn State.

New York Giants general manager Ernie Accorsi, who spent decades guiding NFL teams notes, "it's unprecedented; it's hard to believe," Accorsi said. "That record for a father and son at the same university—and the son played in the Big Ten—that is something mind-boggling."

== Personal ==
Pittman is currently the senior vice president of publishing at Schurz Communications, a South Bend, Indiana-based media company. In 2007, he teamed up with his son Tony to write Playing for Paterno, ISBN 1-60078-000-8, about their shared experiences as the first father/son to play for the legendary coach.

== Trivia ==
Pittman wore jersey number 24 at Penn State—the same number worn by his boyhood idol, and fellow Nittany Lion, Lenny Moore. His son Tony would wear the same number during his days at Penn State (1992–1994) to honor his father. (Lenny Moore wore 24 as a Baltimore Colt but wore 42 during his playing days at Penn State)
