= Phil LaPorta =

Retired American football player (born 1952)

No. 67
- Position: Tackle

Personal information
- Born: May 4, 1952 (age 74); Oceanside, New York, U.S.
- Listed height: 6 ft 4 in (1.93 m)
- Listed weight: 256 lb (116 kg)

Career information
- High school: Valley Stream Central (Valley Stream, New York)
- College: Penn State
- NFL draft: 1974: 9th round, 217th overall pick

Career history
- New Orleans Saints (1974–1975)

Career NFL statistics
- Games played: 20
- Games started: 7
- Stats at Pro Football Reference

Phil LaPorta (born May 4, 1952) is an American former professional football player who was a tackle for the New Orleans Saints of the National Football League (NFL) from 1974 to 1975. He played college football for the Penn State Nittany Lions.
