= Bruce Bannon =

American football player (born 1951)

No. 58
- Position: Linebacker

Personal information
- Born: March 11, 1951 (age 75); Rockaway, New Jersey, U.S.
- Listed height: 6 ft 3 in (1.91 m)
- Listed weight: 225 lb (102 kg)

Career information
- High school: Rockaway (NJ) Morris Hills
- College: Penn State
- NFL draft: 1973: 5th round, 116th overall pick

Career history
- Miami Dolphins (1973–1974)

Awards and highlights
- Super Bowl champion (VIII); Consensus All-American (1972); 2× First-team All-East (1971, 1972)

Career NFL statistics
- Games played: 28
- Games started: 0
- Stats at Pro Football Reference

Bruce Patrick Bannon (born March 11, 1951) is an American former professional football player who was a linebacker in the National Football League (NFL) for two seasons during the early 1970s. He played college football for Penn State University and earned consensus All-American honors. The New York Jets selected him in the fifth round of the 1973 NFL draft, and he played for the NFL's Miami Dolphins in 1973 and 1974.

Bannon was born in Rockaway, New Jersey. He started playing football at 8 years old in the Morris County Midget Football League for the Rockaway Township Rockets as a quarterback. He played high school football at Morris Hills High School in Rockaway. Bannon was inducted into the Morris Hills (N.J.) Regional District Hall of Fame.

Bannon attended Pennsylvania State University where he played for coach Joe Paterno's Penn State Nittany Lions football team from 1969 to 1972. He was recognized as a consensus first-team All-American and the defensive Most Valuable Player (MVP) of the 1972 Cotton Bowl Classic. He graduated from Penn State in 1973 with a bachelor of science degree in geology. Bannon was also named First-team All-America and selected to play in the Hula Bowl the following season.

The Nittany Lions compiled a 28-6 record in his three seasons at Penn State, and the team twice received the Lambert-Meadowlands Trophy as the best team in the Northeast. Bannon was a Hall of Fame Scholar-Athlete with an NCAA Postgraduate scholarship. He was a 1972 Academic All American as well. Bannon had 223 tackles as a defensive end and was outstanding as a pass rusher.

He resides in Pennsylvania. Reports of his death in early 2008 were erroneous, arising from the death of an individual with the same name.
