= Bill Dugan =

American football player (born 1959)

No. 66, 56, 68, 70
- Position: Guard

Personal information
- Born: June 5, 1959 (age 67); Hornell, New York, U.S.
- Listed height: 6 ft 4 in (1.93 m)
- Listed weight: 275 lb (125 kg)

Career information
- College: Penn State
- NFL draft: 1981: 3rd round, 58th overall pick

Career history
- Seattle Seahawks (1981–1983); Minnesota Vikings (1984); Baltimore Stars (1985); New York Giants (1987)

Awards and highlights
- First-team All-American (1980); First-team All-East (1980)

Career NFL statistics
- Games played: 44
- Games started: 8
- Stats at Pro Football Reference

William H. Dugan (born June 5, 1959) is an American former professional football player who was an offensive lineman in the National Football League (NFL) for the Seattle Seahawks, Minnesota Vikings, and New York Giants. Dugan played college football for the Penn State Nittany Lions and was selected 58th overall in the third round of the 1981 NFL draft.
