= John Nessel =

American football player (born 1952)

Profile
- Position: Guard

Personal information
- Born: December 31, 1952 (age 73); Norwalk, Connecticut, U.S.
- Listed height: 6 ft 6 in (1.98 m)
- Listed weight: 268 lb (122 kg)

Career information
- College: Penn State
- NFL draft: 1975: 4th round, 81st overall pick

Career history
- Atlanta Falcons (1975)*; Kansas City Chiefs (1975)*; Philadelphia Eagles (1975)*; New England Patriots (1976)*; Minnesota Vikings (1977)*
- * Offseason or practice squad member only

Awards and highlights
- First-team All-American (1974)

John Steve Nessel (born 1952) is a former professional American football player. Nessel was an All-American guard at Penn State in 1974 and was the fourth-round draft pick (#81 overall) of the Atlanta Falcons in the 1975 NFL draft. On August 5, 1975, he was traded to the Kansas City Chiefs. He then was assigned on waivers to the Philadelphia Eagles on August 15th, 1975 and was released on September 1st of the same year. in 1976 Nessel signed with the New England Patriots but was released before ever playing for them. In 1977 he was signed by the Minnesota Vikings but was released before playing in a game for them.

Nessel earned a Bachelor of Science in Industrial Arts Education from Penn State in 1975 and is now a technology education instructor at Ridgefield High School in Ridgefield, Connecticut. He lives with his wife Jo Ann, in Wilton, Connecticut.
