= Ed O'Neil =

American football player and coach (born 1952)

No. 55, 56
- Position: Linebacker

Personal information
- Born: September 8, 1952 (age 74); Warren, Pennsylvania, U.S.
- Listed height: 6 ft 3 in (1.91 m)
- Listed weight: 236 lb (107 kg)

Career information
- High school: Warren, PA
- College: Penn State
- NFL draft: 1974: 1st round, 8th overall pick

Career history

Playing
- Detroit Lions (1974–1979); Green Bay Packers (1980)

Coaching
- Indiana Hoosiers (1982–1983) Linebackers coach; Rutgers Scarlet Knights (1984–1994) Special teams/linebackers coach/tight ends; Buffalo Bulls (1996–1998) Defensive coordinator; Frankfurt Galaxy (1999–2000) Linebackers coach; Rhein Fire (2001–2003) Defensive line/special teams coach; Frankfurt Galaxy (2004–2006) Defensive coordinator/linebackers coach; Hamilton Tiger-Cats (2007) Defensive coordinator; Toronto Argonauts (2009) Linebackers coach; Niagara-Wheatfield High School (2010–2013) Assistant coach

Awards and highlights
- First-team All-American (1973); First-team All-East (1973)

Career NFL statistics
- Sacks: 6
- Fumble recoveries: 7
- Interceptions: 5
- Stats at Pro Football Reference

Edward William O'Neil (born September 8, 1952) is an American football coach and former professional linebacker, who played seven seasons in the National Football League (NFL).

== Early life and college ==
O'Neil was named a high school All-American while attending Warren Area High School in Warren, Pennsylvania. From 1970 to 1973, he played linebacker for coaching legend Joe Paterno at Penn State. A three-year letterman, he was team captain of the Nittany Lions' undefeated 1973 team and was named an All-American that same season.

O'Neil earned a Bachelor of Science in Health and Physical Education from Penn State University in 1974. He was a member of Phi Gamma Delta.

== Professional career ==
O'Neil was a first-round draft pick, eighth overall, by the Detroit Lions in the 1974 NFL draft. He played linebacker for the Lions from 1974 to 1979 and the Green Bay Packers in 1980.

== Coaching career ==
He was the defensive coordinator for Hamilton Tiger-Cats of the Canadian Football League. He was hired March 2, 2007 to replace former coordinator Rod Rust, who now serves as a defensive consultant. Prior to coaching in the CFL, O'Neil spent three seasons as defensive coordinator for NFL Europe's Frankfurt Galaxy (2004–2006). He also coached for the Rhein Fire in 2002 and 2003.

It was as linebackers and special teams coach at Rutgers (1984–1994) that O'Neil first worked for future Frankfurt head coach Dick Curl. From 1996 to 1998, O'Neil was defensive coordinator for the University at Buffalo. He was also on the staff of Eastern Michigan University, followed by a year in Indiana University during 1983 under head coach Sam Wyche.

In 2010, O'Neil became an assistant coach for the Niagara-Wheatfield High School Falcons football team in Niagara County, New York.

In 2012, O'Neil was the head coach of North Tonawanda High School's Junior Varsity team.

In 2013 was the assistant defensive coordinator of the North Tonawanda High School's Varsity Team. In 2014 he retired from coaching.

== Personal life ==
O'Neil lives in Pendleton, New York with his wife, Nancy. His eldest son, Kevin O'Neil, played linebacker at Syracuse University. Son Keith O'Neil played in the NFL for the Dallas Cowboys and the 2007 Super Bowl Champion Indianapolis Colts. His son-in law, Drew Haddad, was drafted by the Buffalo Bills in the seventh round of the 2000 NFL draft. He played for the Indianapolis Colts and San Diego Chargers after setting several records for receiving at the University at Buffalo.
