= 2025 Nebraska Cornhuskers football team =

American college football season

2025 Nebraska Cornhuskers football

Las Vegas Bowl, L 22–44 vs. Utah
- Conference: Big Ten Conference
- Record: 7–6 (4–5 Big Ten)
- Head coach: Matt Rhule (3rd season)
- Offensive coordinator: Dana Holgorsen (1st season)
- Co-offensive coordinator: Glenn Thomas (2nd season)
- Offensive scheme: Spread
- Defensive coordinator: John Butler (1st season)
- Base defense: 3–3–5
- Home stadium: Memorial Stadium

Uniform
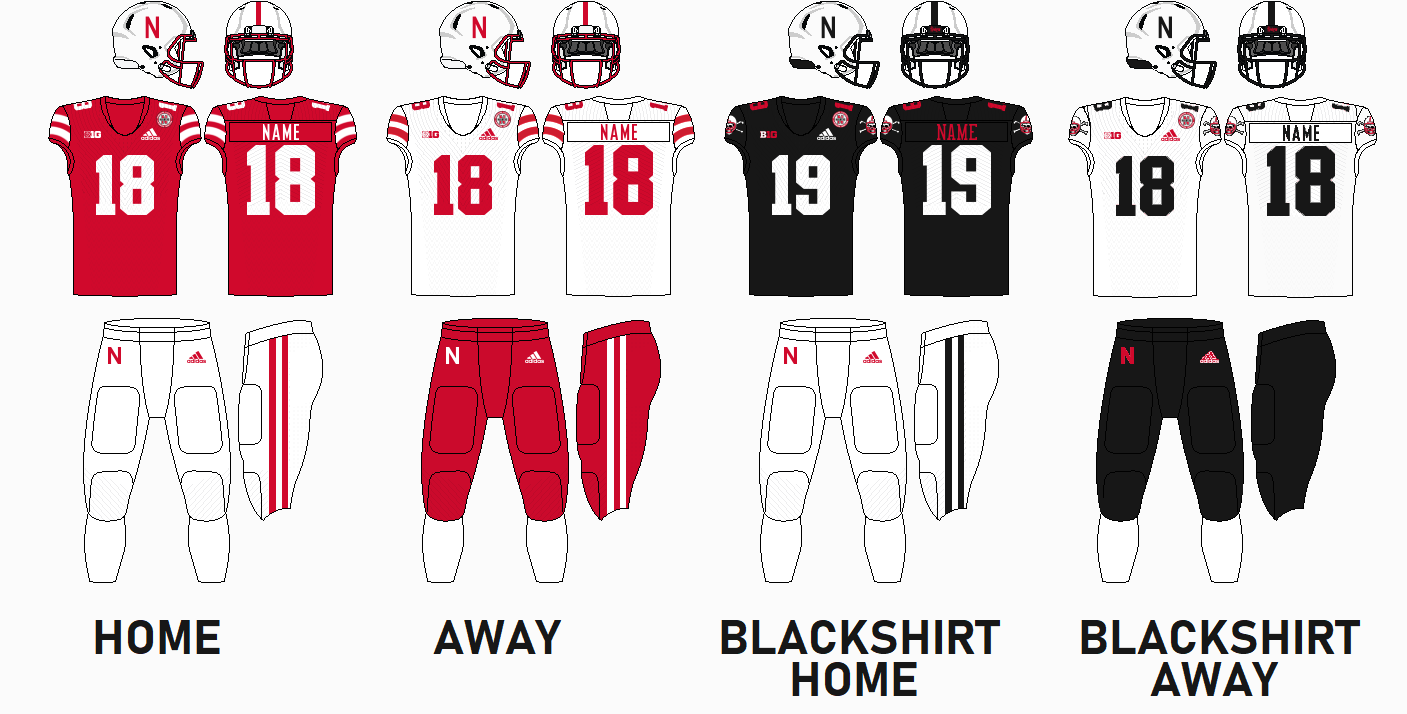

2025 Big Ten Conference football standings
	Conf.			Overall
Team	W		L	W		L
No. 1 Indiana y$#^	9	–	0	16	–	0
No. 5 Ohio State y^	9	–	0	12	–	2
No. 4 Oregon ^	8	–	1	13	–	2
No. 21 Michigan	7	–	2	9	–	4
No. 20 USC	7	–	2	9	–	4
No. 17 Iowa	6	–	3	9	–	4
Illinois	5	–	4	9	–	4
Washington	5	–	4	9	–	4
Minnesota	5	–	4	8	–	5
Nebraska	4	–	5	7	–	6
Northwestern	4	–	5	7	–	6
Penn State	3	–	6	7	–	6
UCLA	3	–	6	3	–	9
Rutgers	2	–	7	5	–	7
Wisconsin	2	–	7	4	–	8
Maryland	1	–	8	4	–	8
Michigan State	1	–	8	4	–	8
Purdue	0	–	9	2	–	10
Championship: Indiana 13, Ohio State 10
# – College Football Playoff champion; ^ – College Football Playoff participant; $ – Conference champion; y – Championship game participant; As of October 20, 2026; Rankings from AP Poll

The 2025 Nebraska Cornhuskers football team represented the University of Nebraska–Lincoln as a member of the Big Ten Conference during the 2025 NCAA Division I FBS football season. The Cornhuskers were led by third-year head coach Matt Rhule, and played their home contests at Memorial Stadium in Lincoln, Nebraska.

== Offseason ==
=== Transfers ===
==== Incoming ====
Name	Position	Height	Weight	Class	Hometown	Previous
Jamir Conn	CB	6'0"	160	Sophomore	Lee's Summit, MO	Southern Illinois
Kyle Cunanan	PK	5'10"	180	Sophomore	Phoenix, AZ	California
Marcos Davila	QB	6'3"	235	Freshman	Midland, TX	Purdue
Kevin Gallic	LS	6'0"	239	Junior	Warren, NJ	New Hampshire
Jaylen George	DL	6'2"	265	(R) Sophomore	Suwanee, GA	East Tennessee State
Hardley Gilmore	WR	6'1"	165	Freshman	Belle Glade, FL	Kentucky
Marquis Groves-Killebrew	CB	6'0"	172	(R) Sophomore	Snellville, GA	Arizona
Nyziah Hunter	WR	6'2"	192	(R) Freshman	Salinas, CA	California
Dane Key	WR	6'2"	189	Junior	Lexington, KY	Kentucky
Andrew Marshall	CB	6'1"	170	Sophomore	Corona, CA	Idaho
Jack McCallister	P	6'0"	216	(R) Junior	Edmonds, WA	Washington
Dasan McCullough	S	6'5"	230	Junior	Bloomington, IN	Oklahoma
Gabe Moore	DL	6'4"	290	Sophomore	Louisville, MS	Mississippi State
Williams Nwaneri	EDGE	6'6"	265	Freshman	Lee's Summit, MO	Missouri
Elijah Pritchett	OT	6'6"	306	(R) Sophomore	Columbus, GA	Alabama
Justyn Rhett	CB	6'0"	183	(R) Freshman	Las Vegas, NV	Georgia
Rocco Spindler	OL	6'5"	325	Senior	Clarkston, MI	Notre Dame
Marques Watson-Trent	LB	5'11"	190	(R) Senior	Beaver Falls, PA	Georgia Southern

==== Outgoing ====
Name	Number	Position	Height	Weight	Class	Hometown	Destination
D'Andre Barnes	#35	DB	6'0"	175	(R) Freshman	Aurora, CO	Utah State
Leslie Black	#96	DL	6'6"	270	(R) Freshman	Statesboro, GA	West Georgia
Nate Boerkircher	#87	TE	6'5"	250	Junior	Aurora, NE	Texas A&M
Dwight Bootle II	#21	CB	5'10"	180	(R) Freshman	Miami, FL	Charlotte
David Borchers	#73	OL	6'2"	305	(R) Freshman	Eldridge, IA	Western Illinois
Koby Bretz	#26	S	6'2"	210	(R) Junior	Omaha, NE	South Dakota State
Alex Bullock	#84	WR	6'2"	205	(R) Junior	Omaha, NE	South Dakota State
Noah Bustard	#50	LB	6'1"	225	(R) Freshman	Omaha, NE	Midwestern State
Jimari Butler	#10	EDGE	6'5"	260	(R) Junior	Mobile, AL	LSU
Malachi Coleman	#15	WR	6'4"	210	Sophomore	Lincoln, NE	Minnesota
Jaidyn Doss	#12	WR	6'0"	195	(R) Freshman	Kansas City, MO	Kansas
Dante Dowdell	#23	RB	6'1"	225	Sophomore	Picayune, MS	Kentucky
Gabe Ervin Jr.	#22	RB	6'1"	220	Junior	Buford, GA	Kansas State
Ryker Evans	#31	RB	5'11"	180	Freshman	Elwood, NE	Nebraska–Kearney
Ian Flynt	#47	TE	6'4"	255	Freshman	Katy, TX	NC State
Isaiah Garcia-Castaneda	#13	WR	6'0"	220	(R) Senior	Mission Viejo, CA	South Dakota State
Mikai Gbayor	#42	LB	6'2"	230	(R) Junior	Irvington, NJ	Missouri
Arik Gilbert	#89	TE	6'6"	260	(R) Sophomore	Marietta, GA	Savannah State
Dae'vonn Hall	#83	WR	6'2"	190	Freshman	Plattsmouth, NE	Nebraska–Kearney
Jacob Hood	#71	OT	6'8"	350	Sophomore	Nashville, TN	Nicholls
Vincent Jackson	#55	DL	6'5"	290	(R) Freshman	Harrisburg, PA	UConn
Mason Jones	#45	DB	5'11"	200	(R) Freshman	Omaha, NE	Lindenwood
Daniel Kaelin	#12	QB	6'3"	220	Freshman	Elkhorn, NE	Virginia
Jaylen Lloyd	#19	WR	5'11"	180	Sophomore	Omaha, NE	Oklahoma State
Jack McCallister	#--	P	6'0"	216	(R) Junior	Edmonds, WA	Purdue
Isaiah McMorris	#88	WR	5'10"	170	Freshman	Omaha, NE	Missouri State
Nico Ottomanelli	#91	PK	6'2"	185	Freshman	Harrington Park, NJ	Sam Houston
AJ Rollins	#86	TE	6'5"	255	Junior	Omaha, NE	TBD
Xander Ruggeroli	#73	OT	6'8"	285	Freshman	Las Vegas, NV	Arizona State
Syncere Safeeullah	#44	CB	6'2"	180	(R) Freshman	Nashville, TN	Tennessee State
Grant Seagren	#79	OL	6'6"	305	(R) Freshman	Oakland, NE	Oklahoma State
Ismael Smith Flores	#81	LB	6'4"	245	(R) Freshman	Arlington, TX	UT Rio Grande Valley
Brodie Tagaloa	#87	DL	6'5"	270	Sophomore	Pittsburg, CA	Sacramento State
Evan Taylor	#37	DB	6'2"	185	Freshman	Waxhaw, NC	Mercer
Stefon Thompson	#56	LB	6'0"	240	(R) Junior	Long Island, NY	Florida State
Princewill Umanmielen	#18	EDGE	6'5"	245	Sophomore	Austin, TX	Ole Miss
Gage Wager	#34	LB	5'10"	190	(R) Freshman	Arlington, TX	TBD
Kai Wallin	#93	DL	6'5"	250	Sophomore	Sacramento, CA	Oregon State
James Williams	#90	EDGE	6'6"	245	(R) Sophomore	Parkville, MO	Florida State

== Schedule ==
Date	Time	Opponent	Rank	Site	TV	Result	Attendance
August 28	8:00 p.m.	vs. Cincinnati*		Arrowhead Stadium; Kansas City, MO	ESPN	W 20–17	72,884
September 6	6:30 p.m.	Akron*		Memorial Stadium; Lincoln, NE	BTN	W 68–0	86,439
September 13	11:00 a.m.	Houston Christian*		Memorial Stadium; Lincoln, NE	FS1	W 59–7	86,292
September 20	2:30 p.m.	No. 21 Michigan		Memorial Stadium; Lincoln, NE	CBS	L 27–30	87,278
October 4	3:00 p.m.	Michigan State^{†}		Memorial Stadium; Lincoln, NE	FS1	W 38–27	86,496
October 11	2:30 p.m.	at Maryland		SECU Stadium; College Park, MD	BTN	W 34–31	39,623
October 17	7:00 p.m.	at Minnesota	No. 25	Huntington Bank Stadium; Minneapolis, MN ($5 Bits of Broken Chair)	FOX	L 6–24	48,549
October 25	11:00 a.m.	Northwestern		Memorial Stadium; Lincoln, NE	FS1	W 28–21	86,401
November 1	6:30 p.m.	No. 23 USC		Memorial Stadium; Lincoln, NE	NBC	L 17–21	86,529
November 8	8:00 p.m.	at UCLA		Rose Bowl; Pasadena, CA	FS2/FOX (Note: First part of the game was moved to FS2 to accommodate the conclusion of the men's basketball game between Michigan State and Arkansas, which originally aired on FOX.)	W 28–21	44,481
November 22	6:00 p.m.	at Penn State		Beaver Stadium; University Park, PA	NBC	L 10–37	105,038
November 28	11:00 a.m.	Iowa		Memorial Stadium; Lincoln, NE (Heroes Game)	CBS	L 16–40	86,410
December 31	2:30 p.m.	vs. No. 15 Utah*		Allegiant Stadium; Paradise, NV (Las Vegas Bowl)	ESPN	L 22–44	38,879
*Non-conference game; ^{†}Homecoming; Rankings from AP Poll – Released prior to game; All times are in Central time; Source:

== Rankings ==
Ranking movements Legend: ██ Increase in ranking ██ Decrease in ranking — = Not ranked RV = Received votes
	Week																
Poll	Pre	1	2	3	4	5	6	7	8	9	10	11	12	13	14	15	Final
AP	RV	RV	RV	RV	—	—	RV	25	—	—	—	—	—	—	—	—	—
Coaches	RV	RV	RV	RV	RV	RV	RV	RV	—	RV	—	RV	RV	—	—	—	—
CFP	Not released										—	—	—	—	—	—	Not released

== Game summaries ==
=== vs. Cincinnati ===
Nebraska Cornhuskers (0–0) vs. Cincinnati Bearcats (0–0) – Game summary

Quarter	1	2	3	4	Total
Cornhuskers	0	13	0	7	20
Bearcats	3	0	7	7	17

at Arrowhead Stadium • Kansas City, Missouri

- Date: August 28
- Game time: 8:00 p.m.
- Game weather: Sunny, 78 °F (26 °C), Wind E @ 6 mph (10 km/h)
- Game attendance: 72,884
- Referee: David Alvarez
- TV announcers (ESPN): Mark Jones (play-by-play), Roddy Jones (analyst), and Quint Kessenich (sideline reporter)
- Sources: huskers.com

Game information

First quarter

- (4:47) CIN – Stephen Rusnak 45-yard field goal (Drive: 8 plays, 38 yards, 4:13, Cincinnati 3–0)

Second quarter

- (14:56) NEB – Kyle Cunanan 52-yard field goal (Drive: 11 plays, 42 yards, 4:51, 3–3)
- (5:36) NEB – Kyle Cunanan 22-yard field goal (Drive: 16 plays, 80 yards, 7:51, Nebraska 6–3)
- (0:11) NEB – Nyziah Hunter 5-yard pass from Dylan Raiola, Kyle Cunanan kick (Drive: 3 plays, 24 yards, 0:51, Nebraska 13–3)

Third quarter

- (6:53) CIN – Brendan Sorsby 7-yard run, Stephen Rusnak kick (Drive: 10 plays, 57 yards, 3:32, Nebraska 13–10)

Fourth quarter

- (10:36) NEB – Dane Key 3-yard pass from Dylan Raiola, Kyle Cunanan kick (Drive: 13 plays, 67 yards, 7:02, Nebraska 20–10)
- (7:15) CIN – Brendan Sorsby 1-yard run, Stephen Rusnak kick (Drive: 9 plays, 75 yards, 3:21, Nebraska 20–17)

Statistics	NEB	CIN
First downs	23	16
Plays–yards	78–353	55–271
Rushes–yards	36–110	30–202
Passing yards	243	69
Passing: comp–att–int	33–42–0	13–25–1
Turnovers	0	2
Time of possession	39:30	20:30

Team	Category	Player	Statistics
Nebraska	Passing	Dylan Raiola	33/42, 243 yards, 2 TD
Nebraska	Rushing	Emmett Johnson	25 carries, 108 yards
Nebraska	Receiving	Nyziah Hunter	6 receptions, 65 yards, TD
Cincinnati	Passing	Brendan Sorsby	13/25, 69 yards, INT
Cincinnati	Rushing	Brendan Sorsby	13 carries, 96 yards, 2 TD
Cincinnati	Receiving	Cyrus Allen	5 receptions, 41 yards

=== vs Akron ===
Akron Zips (0–1) at Nebraska Cornhuskers (1–0) – Game summary

Quarter	1	2	3	4	Total
Zips	0	0	0	0	0
Cornhuskers	9	24	21	14	68

at Memorial Stadium • Lincoln, Nebraska

- Date: September 6
- Game time: 6:30 p.m.
- Game weather: Clear, 65 °F (18 °C), Wind NW @ 6 mph (10 km/h)
- Game attendance: 86,439
- Referee: Chris Coyte
- TV announcers (BTN): Mark Followill (play-by-play), Anthony Herron (analyst), and Dannie Rogers (sideline reporter)
- Sources: huskers.com

Game information

First Quarter

- (12:17) NEB – Emmett Johnson 47-yard run, Kyle Cunanan kick (Drive: 7 plays, 77 yards, 2:39, Nebraska 7–0)
- (4:44) NEB – Kade Pietrzak safety (Drive: 1 play, 1:25, Nebraska 9–0)

Second Quarter

- (13:56) NEB – Kyle Cunanan 35-yard field goal (Drive: 4 plays, 4 yards, 0:50, Nebraska 12–0)
- (8:17) NEB – Emmett Johnson 4-yard pass from Dylan Raiola, Kyle Cunanan kick (Drive: 8 plays, 59 yards, 3:44, Nebraska 19–0)
- (2:08) NEB – Quinn Clark 37-yard pass from Dylan Raiola, Kyle Cunanan kick (Drive: 7 plays, 89 yards, 3:38, Nebraska 26–0)
- (0:46) NEB – Luke Lindenmeyer 10-yard pass from Dylan Raiola, Kyle Cunanan kick (Drive: 3 plays, 31 yards, 0:55, Nebraska 33–0)

Third Quarter

- (10:49) NEB – Emmett Johnson 6-yard run, Kyle Cunanan kick (Drive: 6 plays, 52 yards, 1:25, Nebraska 40–0)
- (5:58) NEB – Dane Key 12-yard pass from Dylan Raiola, Kyle Cunanan kick (Drive: 4 plays, 78 yards, 1:30, Nebraska 47–0)
- (2:37) NEB – Kwinten Ives 28-yard run, Kyle Cunanan kick (Drive: 5 plays, 74 yards, 2:21, Nebraska 54–0)
- Fourth Quarter
- (13:01) NEB – Mekhi Nelson 1-yard run, Kyle Cunanan kick (Drive: 5 plays, 51 yards, 1:55, Nebraska 61–0)
- (7:31) NEB – TJ Lateef 8-yard run, Kyle Cunanan kick (Drive: 4 plays, 43 yards, 1:59, Nebraska 68–0)

Statistics	AKR	NEB
First downs	13	30
Plays–yards	59–175	73–728
Rushes–yards	36–113	33–234
Passing yards	62	494
Passing: Comp–Att–Int	9–23–0	32–40–0
Turnovers	1	1
Time of possession	29:50	30:10

Team	Category	Player	Statistics
Akron	Passing	Ben Finley	7/21, 54 yards
Akron	Rushing	Sean Patrick	12 carries, 64 yards
Akron	Receiving	Marcel Williams	2 receptions, 28 yards
Nebraska	Passing	Dylan Raiola	24/31, 364 yards, 4 TD
Nebraska	Rushing	Emmett Johnson	14 carries, 140 yards, 2 TD
Nebraska	Receiving	Jacory Barney Jr.	7 receptions, 132 yards

=== vs Houston Christian (FCS) ===
Houston Christian Huskies (FCS) (1–1) at Nebraska Cornhuskers (2–0) – Game summary

Quarter	1	2	3	4	Total
Huskies (FCS)	0	0	7	0	7
Cornhuskers	17	21	14	7	59

at Memorial Stadium • Lincoln, Nebraska

- Date: September 13
- Game time: 11:00 a.m.
- Game weather: Sunny, 84 °F (29 °C), Wind SW @ 14 mph (23 km/h)
- Game attendance: 86,292
- Referee: Jim Wharrie
- TV announcers (FS1): Eric Collins (play-by-play) and Spencer Tillman (analyst)
- Sources: huskers.com

Game information

First Quarter

- (11:12) NEB – Kyle Cunanan 24-yard field goal (Drive: 9 plays, 66 yards, 3:43, Nebraska 3–0)
- (6:14) NEB – Jacory Barney Jr. 9-yard pass from Dylan Raiola, Kyle Cunanan kick (Drive: 6 plays, 45 yards, 2:47, Nebraska 10–0)
- (3:14) NEB – Dane Key 39-yard pass from Dylan Raiola, Kyle Cunanan kick (Drive: 3 plays, 84 yards, 0:50, Nebraska 17–0)

Second Quarter

- (11:34) NEB – Emmett Johnson 2-yard run, Kyle Cunanan kick (Drive: 9 plays, 70 yards, 3:42, Nebraska 24–0)
- (9:38) NEB – Williams Nwaneri 29-yard fumble return, Kyle Cunanan kick (Drive: 1:50, Nebraska 31–0)
- (2:52) NEB – Emmett Johnson 4-yard run, Kyle Cunanan kick (Drive: 10 plays, 75 yards, 3:48, Nebraska 38–0)

Third Quarter

- (9:19) NEB – TJ Lateef 6-yard run, Kyle Cunanan kick (Drive: 8 plays, 78 yards, 4:00, Nebraska 45–0)
- (7:34) HCU – Xai'Shaun Edwards 45-yard run, Charlie Weinrich kick (Drive: 4 plays, 75 yards, 1:45, Nebraska 45–7)
- (4:01) NEB – Kwinten Ives 4-yard run, Kyle Cunanan kick (Drive: 7 plays, 75 yards, 3:33, Nebraska 52–7)

Fourth Quarter

- (8:14) NEB – Cortez Mills Jr. 62-yard pass from TJ Lateef, Kyle Cunanan kick (Drive: 3 plays, 80 yards, 1:22, Nebraska 59–7)

Statistics	HCU	NEB
First downs	11	30
Plays–yards	53–160	67–554
Rushes–yards	35–93	38–192
Passing yards	67	362
Passing: Comp–Att–Int	11–18–0	23–29–0
Turnovers	2	0
Time of possession	29:43	30:17

Team	Category	Player	Statistics
Houston Christian	Passing	Jake Weir	11/18, 67 yards
Houston Christian	Rushing	Xai'Shaun Edwards	13 carries, 82 yards, TD
Houston Christian	Receiving	Ja'Ryan Wallace	5 receptions, 31 yards
Nebraska	Passing	Dylan Raiola	15/21, 222 yards, 2 TD
Nebraska	Rushing	Kwinten Ives	12 carries, 85 yards, TD
Nebraska	Receiving	Dane Key	4 receptions, 104 yards, TD

=== vs No. 21 Michigan ===
No. 21 Michigan Wolverines (2–1) at Nebraska Cornhuskers (3–0) – Game summary

Quarter	1	2	3	4	Total
No. 21 Wolverines	10	7	10	3	30
Cornhuskers	0	17	0	10	27

at Memorial Stadium • Lincoln, Nebraska

- Date: September 20
- Game time: 2:30 p.m.
- Game weather: Sunny, 73 degrees, Wind W @ 1 MPH
- Game attendance: 87,278
- Referee: Kole Knueppel
- TV announcers (CBS): Brad Nessler (play-by-play), Gary Danielson (analyst), and Jenny Dell (sideline reporter)
- Sources: huskers.com

Game information

First Quarter

- (1:38) MICH – Dominic Zvada 46-yard field goal (Drive: 10 plays, 46 yards, 3:22, Michigan 3–0)
- (0:11) MICH – Bryce Underwood 37-yard run, Dominic Zvada kick (Drive: 1 play, 37 yards, 0:06, Michigan 10–0)

Second Quarter

- (8:58) NEB – Kyle Cunanan 39-yard field goal (Drive: 7 plays, 31 yards, 4:10, Michigan 10–3)
- (2:01) NEB – Jacory Barney Jr. 26-yard pass from Dylan Raiola, Kyle Cunanan kick (Drive: 7 plays, 63 yards, 3:57, 10–10)
- (1:51) MICH – Justice Haynes 75-yard run, Dominic Zvada kick (Drive: 1 play, 75 yards, 0:10, Michigan 17–10)
- (0:00) NEB – Jacory Barney Jr. 52-yard pass from Dylan Raiola, Kyle Cunanan kick (Drive: 7 plays, 75 yards, 1:51, 17–17)

Third Quarter

- (7:43) MICH – Dominic Zvada 56-yard field goal (Drive: 8 plays, 22 yards, 2:32, Michigan 20–17)
- (5:40) MICH – Jordan Marshall 54-yard run, Dominic Zvada kick (Drive: 2 plays, 62 yards, 0:32, Michigan 27–17)

Fourth Quarter

- (14:56) NEB – Kyle Cunanan 38-yard field goal (Drive: 12 plays, 55 yards, 5:44, Michigan 27–20)
- (3:54) MICH – Dominic Zvada 21-yard field goal (Drive: 16 plays, 77 yards, 8:46, Michigan 30–20)
- (1:34) NEB – Heinrich Haarberg 3-yard pass from Dylan Raiola, Dominic Zvada kick (Drive: 10 plays, 75 yards, 2:20, Michigan 30–27)

Statistics	MICH	NEB
First downs	16	23
Plays–yards	56–391	72–351
Rushes–yards	33–286	31–43
Passing yards	108	305
Passing: comp–att–int	12–23–0	30–41–1
Turnovers	1	1
Time of possession	33:17	26:43

Team	Category	Player	Statistics
Michigan	Passing	Bryce Underwood	12/22, 105 yards
Michigan	Rushing	Justice Haynes	17 carries, 149 yards, TD
Michigan	Receiving	Donaven McCulley	3 receptions, 39 yards
Nebraska	Passing	Dylan Raiola	30/41, 308 yards, 3 TD, INT
Nebraska	Rushing	Emmett Johnson	19 carries, 65 yards
Nebraska	Receiving	Jacory Barney Jr.	6 receptions, 120 yards, 2 TD

=== vs Michigan State ===
Michigan State Spartans (3–1) at Nebraska Cornhuskers (3–1) – Game summary

Quarter	1	2	3	4	Total
Spartans	0	7	14	6	27
Cornhuskers	14	0	7	17	38

at Memorial Stadium • Lincoln, Nebraska

- Date: October 4
- Game time: 3:00 p.m.
- Game weather: Sunny, 86 degrees F, Wind South @ 20 mph
- Game attendance: 86,496
- Referee: Jeff Servinski
- TV announcers (FS1): Tim Brando (play-by-play), Devin Gardner (analyst), and Josh Sims (sideline reporter)
- Sources: huskers.com

Game information

First Quarter

- (9:09) NEB – Emmett Johnson 2-yard run, Kyle Cunanan kick (Drive: 9 plays, 48 yards, 4:14, Nebraska 7–0)
- (7:37) NEB – Carter Nelson 3-yard blocked punt return, Kyle Cunanan kick (Nebraska 14–0)

Second Quarter

- (12:52) MSU – Jack Velling 2-yard pass from Alessio Millvojevic, Martin Connington kick (Drive: 17 plays, 75 yards, 9:45, Nebraska 14–7)

Third Quarter

- (6:08) MSU – Aidan Chiles 16-yard run, Martin Connington kick (Drive: 11 plays, 48 yards, 7:00, 14–14)
- (2:37) MSU – Aidan Chiles 4-yard run, Martin Connington kick (Drive: 7 plays, 38 yards, 3:24, Michigan State 21–14)
- (1:11) NEB – Emmett Johnson 23-yard run, Kyle Cunanan kick (Drive 5 plays, 75 yards, 1:26, 21–21)

Fourth Quarter

- (13:32) NEB – Kyle Cunanan 27-yard field goal (Drive: 7 plays, 19 yards, 2:36, Nebraska 24–21)
- (6:45) NEB – Nyziah Hunter 59-yard pass from Dylan Raiola, Kyle Cunanan kick (Drive: 1 play, 59 yards, 0:09, Nebraska 31–21)
- (4:27) NEB – Emmett Johnson 11-yard run, Kyle Cunanan kick (Drive: 2 plays, 17 yards, 0:50, Nebraska 38–21)
- (2:01) MSU – Allessio Millvojevic 1-yard run, Omari Kelly pass from Allesssio Millvojevic failed (Drive 7 plays, 75 yards, 2:26, Nebraska 38–27)

Statistics	MSU	NEB
First downs	17	15
Plays–yards	68–240	55–261
Rushes–yards	38–84	31–67
Passing yards	156	194
Passing: comp–att–int	15–30–2	16–24–1
Turnovers	3	1
Time of possession	33:24	26:36

Team	Category	Player	Statistics
Michigan State	Passing	Aidan Chiles	9/23, 85 yards, 2 INT
Michigan State	Rushing	Makhi Frazier	18 carries, 58 yards
Michigan State	Receiving	Nick Marsh	4 receptions, 41 yards
Nebraska	Passing	Dylan Raiola	16/24, 194 yards, TD, INT
Nebraska	Rushing	Emmett Johnson	13 carries, 83 yards, 3 TD
Nebraska	Receiving	Nyziah Hunter	4 receptions, 93 yards, TD

=== at Maryland ===
Nebraska Cornhuskers (4–1) at Maryland Terrapins (4–1) – Game summary

Quarter	1	2	3	4	Total
Cornhuskers	7	17	0	10	34
Terrapins	0	17	14	0	31

at SECU Stadium • College Park, MD

- Date: October 11
- Game time: 2:30 PM
- Game weather: Sunny, 71 degrees, Wind NE @ 9 mph
- Game attendance: 39,623
- Referee: Jason Nickleby
- TV announcers (BTN): Guy Haberman (play-by-play), Jake Butt (analyst), and Brooke Fletcher (sideline reporter)
- Sources: huskers.com

Game information

First Quarter

- (7:15) NEB – Nyziah Hunter 64-yard pass from Dylan Raiola, Kyle Cunanan kick (Drive: 1 plays, 64 yards, 0:12, Nebraska 7–0)

Second Quarter

- (14:55) NEB – Kyle Cunanan 43-yard field goal (Drive: 10 plays, 47 yards, 5:43, Nebraska 10–0)
- (11:32) MD – Nolan Ray 28-yard run, Sean O'Haire kick (Drive: 8 plays, 75 yards, 3:23. Nebraska 10–7)
- (8:25) MD – Leon Haughton Jr. 21-yard pass from Malik Washington, Sean O'Haire kick (Drive: 4 plays, 33 yards, 2:20, Maryland 14–10)
- (7:27) NEB – Luke Lindenmeyer 7-yard pass from Dylan Raiola, Kyle Cunanan kick (Drive: 2 plays, 10 yards, 0:46, Nebraska 17–14)
- (5:37) NEB – Nyziah Hunter 12-yard pass from Dylan Raiola, Kyle Cunanan kick (Drive: 3 plays, 46 yards, 0:53, Nebraska 24–14)
- (0:24) MD – Sean O'Haire 37-yard field goal (Drive: 13 plays, 66 yards, 3:00, Nebraska 24–17)

Third Quarter

- (9:58) MD – DeJuan Williams 1-yard run, Sean O'Haire kick (Drive: 10 plays, 75 yards, 4:58, 24–24)
- (6:40) MD – Dontay Joyner 67-yard interception return, Sean O'Haire kick (Drive: 3:18, Maryland 31–24)

Fourth Quarter

- (7:47) NEB – Kyle Cunanan 27-yard field goal (Drive: 12 plays, 83 yards, 6:15, Maryland 31–27)
- (1:08) NEB – Dane Key 3-yard pass from Dylan Raiola, Kyle Cunanan kick (Drive: 7 plays, 81 yards, 2:34, Nebraska 34–31)

Statistics	NEB	MD
First downs	23	18
Plays–yards	59–453	67–379
Rushes–yards	30–193	30–130
Passing yards	260	249
Passing: comp–att–int	20–29–3	27–37–0
Turnovers	3	0
Time of possession	28:33	31:27

Team	Category	Player	Statistics
Nebraska	Passing	Dylan Raiola	20/29, 260 yards, 4 TD, 3 INT
Nebraska	Rushing	Emmett Johnson	21 carries, 176 yards
Nebraska	Receiving	Nyziah Hunter	5 receptions, 125 yards, 2 TD
Maryland	Passing	Malik Washington	27/37, 249 yards, TD
Maryland	Rushing	Nolan Ray	11 carries, 62 yards, TD
Maryland	Receiving	Shaleak Knotts	5 receptions, 62 yards

=== at Minnesota (rivalry) ===
No. 25 Nebraska Cornhuskers (5–1) at Minnesota Golden Gophers (5–2) – Game summary

Quarter	1	2	3	4	Total
No. 25 Cornhuskers	3	3	0	0	6
Golden Gophers	0	7	7	10	24

at Huntington Bank Stadium • Minneapolis, MN

- Date: October 17
- Game time: 7:00 p.m.
- Game weather: Clear, 63 degrees, Wind W @ 6 mph
- Game attendance: 48,549
- Referee: Bryan Banks
- TV announcers (FOX): Tim Brando (play-by-play), Devin Gardner (analyst), and Josh Sims (sideline reporter)
- Sources: huskers.com

Game information

First Quarter

- (0:00) NEB – Kyle Cunanan 33-yard field goal (Drive: 12 plays, 70 yards, 6:42, Nebraska 3–0)

Second Quarter

- (13:20) MIN – Drake Lindsey 1-yard run, Brady Denaburg kick (Drive: 4 plays, 90 yards, 1:34, Minnesota 7–3)
- (4:25) NEB – Kyle Cunanan 30-yard field goal (Drive: 9 plays, 69 yards, 5:28, Minnesota 7–6)

Third Quarter

- (2:36) MIN – Lemeke Brockington 20-yard pass from Drake Lindsey, Brady Denaburg kick (Drive: 14 plays, 98 yards, 8:43, Minnesota 14–6)

Fourth Quarter

- (12:32) MIN – Darius Taylor 1-yard run, Brady Denaburg kick (Drive: 4 plays, 40 yards, 1:36, Minnesota 21–6)
- (5:14) MIN – Brady Denaburg 30-yard field goal (Drive: 8 plays, 62 yards, 4:23, Minnesota 24–6)

Statistics	NEB	MINN
First downs	13	18
Plays–yards	54–213	55–339
Rushes–yards	29–36	35–186
Passing yards	177	153
Passing: Comp–Att–Int	17-25-0	16-20-0
Turnovers	0	0
Time of possession	28:01	31:59

Team	Category	Player	Statistics
Nebraska	Passing	Dylan Raiola	17-25, 177 yards
Nebraska	Rushing	Emmett Johnson	14 carries, 63 yards
Nebraska	Receiving	Luke Lindenmeyer	4 receptions, 52 yards
Minnesota	Passing	Drake Lindsey	16-20, 153 yards, TD
Minnesota	Rushing	Darius Taylor	24 carries, 148 yards, TD
Minnesota	Receiving	Jalen Smith	3 receptions, 59 yards

=== vs Northwestern ===
Northwestern Wildcats (5–2) at Nebraska Cornhuskers (5–2) – Game summary

Quarter	1	2	3	4	Total
Wildcats	3	3	7	8	21
Cornhuskers	7	0	14	7	28

at Memorial Stadium • Lincoln, Nebraska

- Date: October 25
- Game time: 11:00 a.m.
- Game weather: Cloudy, 55 degrees, Wind SE @ 8 mph
- Game attendance: 86,401
- Referee: Gregory Blum
- TV announcers (FS1): Connor Onion (play-by-play) and Mark Helfrich (analyst)
- Sources: huskers.com

Game information

First Quarter

- (7:49) NEB – Emmett Johnson 9-yard run, Kyle Cunanan kick (Drive: 9 plays, 69 yards, 4:02, Nebraska 7–0)
- (3:28) NW – Jack Olsen 40-yard field goal (Drive: 9 plays, 53 yards, 4:21, Nebraska 7–3)

Second Quarter

- (3:01) NW – Jack Olsen 25-yard field goal (Drive: 15 plays, 67 yards, 7:43, Nebraska 7–6)

Third Quarter

- (14:47) NEB – Kenneth Williams 95-yard kickoff return, Kyle Cunanan kick (Nebraska 14–6)
- (7:39) NEB – Nyziah Hunter 12-yard pass from Dylan Raiola, Kyle Cunanan kick (Drive: 3 plays, 32 yards, 0:58, Nebraska 21–6)
- (2:25) NW – Caleb Komolafe 4-yard run, Jack Olsen kick (Drive: 9 plays, 78 yards, 5:08, Nebraska 21–13)

Fourth Quarter

- (11:16) NW – Caleb Komolafe 56-yard run, Hayden Eligon II 2-point PAT pass from Preston Stone (Drive: 4 plays, 80 yards, 2:13, 21–21)
- (2:44) NEB – Emmett Johnson 4-yard run, Kyle Cunanan kick (Drive: 13 plays, 64 yards, 6:27, Nebraska 28–21)

Statistics	NU	NEB
First downs	18	18
Plays–yards	59–331	61–296
Rushes–yards	30–172	39–155
Passing yards	159	141
Passing: comp–att–int	15–29–2	16–22–1
Turnovers	2	2
Time of possession	29:44	30:16

Team	Category	Player	Statistics
Northwestern	Passing	Preston Stone	15/29, 159 yards, 2 INT
Northwestern	Rushing	Caleb Komolafe	17 carries, 125 yards, 2 TD
Northwestern	Receiving	Griffin Wilde	3 receptions, 54 yards
Nebraska	Passing	Dylan Raiola	16/22, 141 yards, TD, INT
Nebraska	Rushing	Emmett Johnson	27 carries, 124 yards, 2 TD
Nebraska	Receiving	Nyziah Hunter	6 receptions, 70 yards, TD

=== vs No. 23 USC ===
No. 23 USC Trojans (5–2) at Nebraska Cornhuskers (6–2) – Game summary

Quarter	1	2	3	4	Total
No. 23 Trojans	0	6	8	7	21
Cornhuskers	7	7	0	3	17

at Memorial Stadium • Lincoln, Nebraska

- Date: November 1
- Game time: 6:37 pm
- Game weather: Clear, 44 degrees, Wind West @ 6 mph
- Game attendance: 86,529
- Referee: Kole Knueppel
- TV announcers (NBC): Noah Eagle (play-by-play), Todd Blackledge (analyst), and Kathryn Tappen (sideline reporter)
- Sources: huskers.com

Game information

First Quarter

- (6:29) NEB – Dane Key 14-yard pass from Dylan Raiola, Kyle Cunanan kick (Drive: 14 plays, 75 yards, 7:01, Nebraska 7–0)

Second Quarter

- (13:23) USC – Ryon Sayeri 24-yard field goal (Drive: 11 plays, 74 yards, 4:35, Nebraska 7–3)
- (6:07) USC – Ryon Sayeri 49-yard field goal (Drive: 10 plays, 53 yards, 4:22, Nebraska 7–6)
- (1:37) NEB – Emmett Johnson 10-yard run, Kyle Cunanan kick (Drive: 8 plays, 75 yards, 4:25, Nebraska 14–6)

Third Quarter

- (3:32) USC – Jayden Maiava 16-yard run, King Miller run (Drive: 5 plays, 66 yards, 1:51, 14–14)

Fourth Quarter

- (12:53) NEB – Kyle Cunanan 39-yard field goal (Drive: 10 plays, 57 yards, 5:33, Nebraska 17–14)
- (10:06) USC – King Miller 6-yard run, Ryon Sayeri kick (Drive: 6 plays, 75 yards, 2:47, USC 21–17)

Statistics	USC	NEB
First downs	20	20
Plays–yards	61–337	62–286
Rushes–yards	38–202	40–188
Passing yards	135	98
Passing: comp–att–int	9–23–1	15–22–0
Turnovers	1	1
Time of possession	27:02	32:58

Team	Category	Player	Statistics
USC	Passing	Jayden Maiava	9/23, 135 yards, INT
USC	Rushing	King Miller	18 carries, 129 yards, TD
USC	Receiving	Jaden Richardson	1 reception, 43 yards
Nebraska	Passing	Dylan Raiola	10/15, 91 yards, TD
Nebraska	Rushing	Emmett Johnson	29 carries, 165 yards, TD
Nebraska	Receiving	Nyziah Hunter	5 receptions, 30 yards

=== at UCLA ===
Nebraska Cornhuskers (6–3) at UCLA Bruins (3–5) – Game summary

Quarter	1	2	3	4	Total
Cornhuskers	7	14	7	0	28
Bruins	0	7	7	7	21

at Rose Bowl • Pasadena, CA

- Date: November 8
- Game time: 8:00 pm
- Game weather: Sunny, 69 degrees, Wind South @ 2 mph
- Game attendance: 44,481
- Referee: Francisco Villar
- TV announcers (FOX): Tim Brando (play-by-play), Devin Gardner (analyst), Josh Sims (sideline reporter)
- Sources: huskers.com

Game information

First Quarter

- (6:29) NEB – Jacory Barney Jr. 2-yard pass from TJ Lateef, Kyle Cunanan kick (Drive: 9 plays, 61 yards, 5:19, Nebraska 7–0)

Second Quarter

- (13:14) UCLA - Jalen Berger 1-yard run, Mateen Bhaghani kick (Drive: 17 plays, 75 yards, 9:46, 7-7)
- (11:01) NEB - Emmett Johnson 56-yard pass from TJ Lateef, Kyle Cunanan kick (Drive: 4 plays, 75 yards, 2:13, Nebraska 14-7)
- (1:47) NEB - Emmett Johnson 1-yard run, Kyle Cunanan kick (Drive: 9 plays, 60 yards, 4:31, Nebraska 21-7)

Third Quarter

- (11:44) NEB - Emmett Johnson 40-yard pass from TJ Lateef, Kyle Cunanan kick (Drive: 6 plays, 75 yards, 3:16, Nebraska 28-7)
- (9:58) UCLA - Anthony Woods 45-yard pass from Nico Iamaleava, Mateen Bhaghani kick (Drive: 4 plays, 69 yards, 1:39, Nebraska 28-14)

Fourth Quarter

- (4:54) UCLA - Anthony Frias II 9-yard pass from Nico Iamaleava, Mateen Bhaghani kick (Drive: 12 plays, 96 yards, 6:39, Nebraska 28-21)

Statistics	NEB	UCLA
First downs	20	21
Plays–yards	54–361	64–348
Rushes–yards	39–156	37–157
Passing yards	205	191
Passing: comp–att–int	13–15–0	17–27–0
Turnovers	0	0
Time of possession	30:00	30:00

Team	Category	Player	Statistics
Nebraska	Passing	TJ Lateef	13/15, 205 yards, 3 TD
Nebraska	Rushing	Emmett Johnson	28 carries, 129 yards, TD
Nebraska	Receiving	Jacory Barney Jr.	4 receptions, 19 yards, TD
UCLA	Passing	Nico Iamaleava	17/25, 191 yards, 2 TD
UCLA	Rushing	Nico Iamaleava	15 carries, 86 yards
UCLA	Receiving	Rico Flores Jr.	6 receptions, 52 yards

=== at Penn State ===
Nebraska Cornhuskers (7-3) at Penn State Nittany Lions (4-6) – Game summary

Quarter	1	2	3	4	Total
Cornhuskers	0	3	7	0	10
Nittany Lions	7	16	7	7	37

at Beaver Stadium • University Park, PA

- Date: November 22
- Game time: 6:00 p.m. CST
- Game weather: 40 °F (4 °C) • Mostly clear
- Game attendance: 105,038
- Referee: Ron Snodgrass
- TV announcers (NBC): Noah Eagle (play-by-play), Todd Blackledge (analyst) and Kathryn Tappen (sideline reporter)
- Sources: huskers.com

Game information

First quarter

- (7:22) PSU – Andrew Rappleyea 4-yard pass from Ethan Grunkemeyer, Ryan Barker kick (Drive: 7 plays, 98 yards, 4:07, Penn State 7–0)

Second quarter

- (12:20) PSU - Ryan Barker 26-yard field goal (Drive: 10 plays, 82 yards, 4:53, Penn State 10-0)
- (8:31) NEB - Kyle Cunanan 31-yard field goal (Drive 8 plays, 48 yards, 3:40, Penn State 10-3)
- (4:09) PSU - Nicholas Singleton 4-yard run, Ryan Barker kick (Drive: 7 plays, 75 yards, 4:22, Penn State 17-3)
- (1:14) PSU - Nicholas Singleton 10-yard run, Ryan Barker kick missed (Drive: 3 plays, 14 yards, 1:11, Penn State 23-3)

Third quarter

- (10:07) PSU - Kaytron Allen 3-yard run, Ryan Barker kick (Drive: 8 plays, 75 yards, 4:53, Penn State 30-3)
- (0:55) NEB - TJ Lateef 11-yard run, Kyle Cunanan kick (Drive: 7 plays, 59 yards, 3:08, Penn State 30-10)

Fourth quarter

- (11:10) PSU - Kaytron Allen 13-yard run, Ryan Barker kick (Drive: 8 plays, 75 yards, 4:45, Penn State 37-10)

Statistics	NEB	PSU
First downs	17	21
Total yards	318	412
Rushes/yards	32 / 131	39 / 231
Passing yards	187	181
Passing: Comp–Att–Int	21-37-0	11–12–0
Turnovers	0	0
Time of possession	29:38	30:22

Team	Category	Player	Statistics
Nebraska	Passing	TJ Lateef	21/37, 187 yards
Nebraska	Rushing	Emmett Johnson	19 carries, 103 yards
Nebraska	Receiving	Jacory Barney Jr.	5 receptions, 55 yards
Penn State	Passing	Ethan Grunkemeyer	11/12, 181 yards, TD
Penn State	Rushing	Kaytron Allen	25 carries, 160 yards, 2 TD
Penn State	Receiving	Nicholas Singleton	3 receptions, 51 yards

=== vs Iowa (rivalry) ===
Iowa Hawkeyes (7-4) at Nebraska Cornhuskers (7-4) – Game summary

Quarter	1	2	3	4	Total
Hawkeyes	10	14	9	7	40
Cornhuskers	10	6	0	0	16

at Memorial Stadium • Lincoln, Nebraska

- Date: November 28
- Game time: 11:00 a.m.
- Game weather: Cloudy • Temperature: 26 °F (−3 °C) • Wind: E at 10 miles per hour (16 km/h)
- Game attendance: 86,410
- Referee: Jeff Servinski
- TV announcers (CBS): Rich Waltz (play-by-play), Ross Tucker (analyst) and Tiffany Blackmon (sideline)
- Sources: huskers.com

Game information

First quarter

- NEB – Emmett Johnson 1-yard run (Kyle Cunanan kick), 10:40. Cornhuskers 7–0. 4 plays, 90 yards, 1:47.
- IOWA – Drew Stevens 41-yard field goal, 8:49. Cornhuskers 7–3. 4 plays, 6 yards, 1:41.
- IOWA – DJ Vonnahme 35-yard pass from Mark Gronowski (Drew Stevens kick), 5:35. Hawkeyes 10–7. 3 plays, 51 yards, 1:37.
- NEB – Kyle Cunanan 31-yard field goal, 1:13. Tied 10–10. 11 plays, 62 yards, 4:22.

Second quarter

- NEB – Kyle Cunanan 29-yard field goal, 13:53. Huskers 13–10. 6 plays, 15 yards, 2:20.
- IOWA – Kamari Moulton 3-yard run (Drew Stevens kick), 8:13. Hawkeyes 17–13. 10 plays, 75 yards, 5:40.
- NEB – Kyle Cunanan 35-yard field goal, 2:53. Hawkeyes 17–16. 10 plays, 56 yards, 5:14.
- IOWA – Mark Gronowski 1-yard run (Drew Stevens kick), 0:37. Hawkeyes 24–16. 9 plays, 75 yards, 2:16.

Third quarter

- IOWA – Safety, 11:16. Hawkeyes 26–16. 5 plays, 12 yards, 3:44.
- IOWA – Mark Gronowski 6-yard run (Drew Stevens kick), 4:47. Hawkeyes 33–16. 7 plays, 71 yards, 3:51.

Fourth quarter

- IOWA – Kamari Moulton 1-yard run (Drew Stevens kick), 13:40. Hawkeyes 40–16. 9 plays, 63 yards, 4:34.

Statistics	IOWA	NEB
First downs	18	14
Plays–yards	62–379	60–300
Rushes–yards	46–213	36–231
Passing yards	166	69
Passing: comp–att–int	9–16–0	9–24–0
Turnovers	1	1
Time of possession	33:20	26:40

Team	Category	Player	Statistics
Iowa	Passing	Mark Gronowski	9/16, 166 yards, TD
Iowa	Rushing	Kamari Moulton	18 carries, 93 yards, 2 TD
Iowa	Receiving	DJ Vonnahme	3 receptions, 91 yards, TD
Nebraska	Passing	TJ Lateef	9/24, 69 yards
Nebraska	Rushing	Emmett Johnson	29 carries, 217 yards, TD
Nebraska	Receiving	Emmett Johnson	2 receptions, 22 yards

=== vs. No. 15 Utah (Las Vegas Bowl) ===
2025 SRS Distribution Las Vegas Bowl
Nebraska Cornhuskers (7-5) vs. No. 15 Utah Utes (10-2) – Game summary

Quarter	1	2	3	4	Total
Cornhuskers	14	0	0	8	22
No. 15 Utes	7	17	14	6	44

at Allegiant Stadium • Las Vegas, NV

- Date: December 31
- Game time: 2:30 p.m. CST
- Game weather: Sunny, 52 degrees
- Game attendance: 38,879
- Referee: Jason Autrey
- TV announcers (ESPN): Dave Flemming (play-by-play), Brock Osweiler (analyst) and Dawn Davenport (sideline)
- Sources: huskers.com

Game information

First Quarter

- (11:08) NEB – Mekhi Nelson 38-yard run, Kyle Cunanan kick (Drive: 8 plays, 82 yards, 3:47, Nebraska 7–0)
- (8:33) UTAH – Devon Dampier 2-yard run, Dillon Curtis kick (Drive: 6 plays, 75 yards, 2:35, 7-7)
- (2:20) NEB – Jacory Barney Jr. 8-yard pass from TJ Lateef, Kyle Cunanan kick (Drive: 12 plays, 75 yards, 6:13, Nebraska 14-7)

Second Quarter

- (10:05) UTAH – JJ Buchanan 20-yard pass from Devon Dampier, Dillon Curtis kick (Drive: 9 plays, 74 yards, 3:23, 14-14)
- (4:13) UTAH – Dillon Curtis 28-yard field goal (Drive: 10 plays, 50 yards, 4:07, Utah 17-14)
- (0:20) UTAH – Devon Dampier 11-yard run, Dillon Curtis kick (Drive: 10 plays, 74 yards, 1:52, 24-14)

Third Quarter

- (10:40) UTAH – NaQuari Rogers 3-yard run, Dillon Curtis kick (Drive: 10 plays, 75 yards, 4:20, 31-14)
- (5:56) UTAH – Devon Dampier 5-yard run, Dillon Curtis kick (Drive: 9 plays, 51 yards, 3:03, 38-14)

Fourth Quarter

- (8:16) UTAH – Dallen Bentley 17-yard pass from Devon Dampier, Dillon Curtis kick missed (Drive: 8 plays, 95 yards, 2:36, 44-14)
- (1:55) NEB – TJ Lateef 7-yard run, Quinn Clark pass from TJ Lateef for 2-pt (Drive: 13 plays, 75 yards, 6:21, 44-22)

Statistics	NEB	UTAH
First downs	17	26
Plays–yards	65–343	76–535
Rushes–yards	37–161	45–225
Passing yards	182	310
Passing: Comp–Att–Int	15–28–1	19–31–0
Turnovers	1	0
Time of possession	31:39	28:21

Team	Category	Player	Statistics
Nebraska	Passing	TJ Lateef	15/28, 182 yards, TD, INT
Nebraska	Rushing	Mekhi Nelson	12 carries, 88 yards, TD
Nebraska	Receiving	Isaiah Mozee	4 receptions, 48 yards
Utah	Passing	Devon Dampier	19/31, 310 yards, 2 TD
Utah	Rushing	Devon Dampier	19 carries, 148 yards, 3 TD
Utah	Receiving	Dallen Bentley	6 receptions, 106 yards, TD

== Big Ten awards ==
=== Player of the week honors ===
Weekly awards
Player	Award	Week awarded	Ref.
DeShon Singleton	Big Ten Defensive Player of the Week	Week 6	
Kenneth Williams	Big Ten Special Teams Player of the Week	Week 9	
Emmett Johnson	Big Ten Offensive Player of the Week	Week 11	
TJ Lateef	Big Ten Freshman Player of the Week	Week 11	

=== All-Conference awards ===
2025 Big Ten offense all-conference teams and awards

Ameche-Dayne Running Back of the Year
Position	Player
RB	Emmett Johnson

Coaches All-Big Ten
Position	Player	Team
RB	Emmett Johnson	First Team
RS	Kenneth Williams	Third Team
TE	Luke Lindenmeyer	Honorable Mention
OL	Rocco Spindler	Honorable Mention
DB	Andrew Marshall	Honorable Mention
DB	Ceyair Wright	Honorable Mention
DB	Dasan McCullough	Honorable Mention
RS	Jacory Barney Jr.	Honorable Mention

Media All-Big Ten
Position	Player	Team
RB	Emmett Johnson	First Team
RS	Kenneth Williams	Second Team
RS	Jacory Barney Jr.	Third Team
TE	Luke Lindenmeyer	Honorable Mention
OL	Rocco Spindler	Honorable Mention
DB	Andrew Marshall	Honorable Mention
DB	Ceyair Wright	Honorable Mention
DB	DeShon Singleton	Honorable Mention
LB	Javin Wright	Honorable Mention

== National awards ==
=== All-America awards ===
All-America Team Selections
Position	Player	Selector	Team
RB	Emmett Johnson	Sports Illustrated	First Team
AP	Emmett Johnson	CBS Sports, On3, Sporting News	First Team
RB	Emmett Johnson	AP, CBS Sports, The Athletic, USA Today, Walter Camp	Second Team
AP	Emmett Johnson	FWAA	Second Team

== Personnel ==
=== Main Roster ===
2025 Nebraska Cornhusker Football
Quarterbacks: 12 Jalyn Gramstad - Gradaute (6'0, 200); 14 TJ Lateef – Freshman (6'2, 200); 15 Dylan Raiola – Sophomore (6'3, 230); Running backs: 21 Emmett Johnson – (redshirt) Junior (5'11, 200); 22 Isaiah Mozee – Freshman (6'0, 205); 28 Kwinten Ives – (redshirt) Sophomore (6’3, 215); 35 Mekhi Nelson – (redshirt) Freshman (6'0, 195); Wide receivers: 2 Jacory Barney – Sophomore (6’0, 170); 6 Dane Key – Senior (6’3, 210); 13 Nyziah Hunter – (redshirt) Sophomore (6'1, 205); 18 Quinn Clark – (redshirt) Freshman (6'5, 210); 19 Cortez Mills - Freshman (6’0, 180); 85 Keelan Smith – (redshirt) Freshman (6'3, 205); Tight ends: 10 Heinrich Haarberg – (redshirt) Senior (6'5, 230); 29 Carter Nelson – Sophomore (6’5, 240); 44 Luke Lindenmeyer – (redshirt) Junior (6’3, 250); 48 Cayden Echternach – (redshirt) Sophomore (6’3, 260); Offensive Lineman: 50 Rocco Spindler – (redshirt) Senior (6’5, 320) -G; 51 Justin Evans – (redshirt) Junior (6’1, 315) -C; 57 Elijah Pritchett – (redshirt) Junior (6’6, 325) -T; 58 Jake Peters – (redshirt) Freshman (6’3, 300) -C; 59 Henry Lutovsky – (redshirt) Senior (6’6, 320) -G; 65 Teddy Prochazka – (redshirt) Senior (6’10, 320) -T; 69 Turner Corcoran – Graduate (6’6, 310) -T; 75 Tyler Knaak – (redshirt) Junior (6’6, 325) -G/T; 76 Jason Maciejczak – (redshirt) Sophomore (6’3, 310) -G; 77 Gunnar Gottula – (redshirt) Sophomore (6’5, 305) -T	Defensive Lineman: 5 Riley Van-Poppel - (redshirt) Sophomore (6’5, 295) -DT; 11 Cameron Lenhardt - Junior (6’3, 270) -DE; 16 Elijah Jeudy – (redshirt) Senior (6’3, 290) -DT; 90 Jaylen George – (redshirt) Junior (6’2, 285) -DT; 93 Kade Pietrzak – (redshirt) Sophomore (6’5, 265) -DE; 95 Gabe Moore – (redshirt) Sophomore (6’5, 290) -DT; 96 Williams Nwaneri – (redshirt) Freshman (6’7, 265) -DE; 97 Keona Davis – Sophomore (6’5, 275) -DT; Linebackers: 0 Javin Wright – Graduate (6’5, 230); 9 Vincent Shavers – Sophomore (6’1, 225); 15 Dasan McCullough – Senior (6’5, 235) -JK; 17 Willis McGahee IV – Sophomore (6’1, 240) -JK; 33 Marques Watson-Trent – Graduate (5’11, 225); 40 Dawson Meritt – Freshman (6’2, 225); 52 Dylan Rogers – (redshirt) Sophomore (6’3, 240) -JK; Defensive backs: 1 Ceyair Wright – (redshirt) Senior (6’0,190); 3 Marques Buford – (redshirt) Senior (5’11, 190); 8 DeShon Singleton – (redshirt) Senior (6’3, 210); 10 Andrew Marshall – Junior (6’0, 190); 12 Justyn Rhett – (redshirt) Sophomore (6’1, 200); 13 Jamir Conn – Junior (5’11,180); 14 Amare Sanders – (redshirt) Freshman (6’1,190); 21 Rex Guthrie – (redshirt) Freshman (6’1, 200); 23 Caleb Benning – (redshirt) Freshman (5’11,200); 25 Jeremiah Chalres – (redshirt) Sophomore (5’11,175); 37 Donovan Jones – (redshirt) Freshman (6’1, 200); Special Teams: 32 Kenneth Williams – (redshirt) Sophomore (5’9,190) -KR; 46 Kevin Gallic – Senior (5’11, 240) -LS; 83 Archie Wilson – Freshman (6’2, 215) -P; 91 Kyle Cunnan – (redshirt) Freshman (5’10,180) -PK
Legend: (C) Team captain; (S) Suspended; (I) Ineligible; Injured; Redshirt

=== Full Roster ===
2025 Nebraska Cornhuskers football team roster
Players
Coaches
Offense

Pos.	#	Name	Class
WR	2	Jacory Barney Jr.	So
WR	4	Janiran Bonner (injured)	Jr
WR	6	Dane Key (C)	Sr
TE	10	Heinrich Haarberg	Sr
WR	11	Demitrius Bell (injured)	So
QB	11	Bode Soukup	RFr
QB	12	Jalyn Gramstad	GS
WR	13	Nyziah Hunter	So
QB	14	TJ Lateef	Fr
QB	15	Dylan Raiola (C)	So
QB	16	Marcos Davila	RFr
QB	17	Luke Longval	Jr
WR	18	Quinn Clark	RFr
WR	19	Cortez Mills	Fr
RB	21	Emmett Johnson	Jr
RB,WR	22	Isaiah Mozee	Fr
RB	23	Conor Booth	Fr
RB	24	Jamarion Parker	Fr
WR	26	Roman Mangini	Jr
RB	28	Kwinten Ives	So
TE	29	Carter Nelson	So
RB	30	Vincent Genatone	Jr
RB	32	Kenneth Williams	So
RB	35	Mekhi Nelson	RFr
WR	36	Rowdy Bauer	RFr
TE	44	Luke Lindenmeyer	Jr
RB	45	Izaac Dickey	RFr
WR	46	Connor Schutt	RFr
TE	48	Cayden Echternach	So
TE	49	Danny King	RFr
OL	50	Rocco Spindler	Sr
OL	51	Justin Evans	Jr
OL	56	Julian "Juju" Marks	Fr
OL	57	Elijah Pritchett	Jr
OL	58	Jake Peters	RFr
OL	59	Henry Lutovsky (C)	Sr
OL	62	Sam Sledge	So
OL	63	Brian Tapu	Fr
OL	65	Teddy Prochazka (injured)	Sr
OL	66	Grant Brix	RFr
OL	67	Houston Kaahaaina-Torres	Fr
OL	68	Preston Taumua	RFr
OL	69	Turner Corcoran	GS
OL	70	Nolan Fennessy	RFr
OL	72	Gibson Pyle (injured)	RFr
OL	74	Brock Knutson	So
OL	75	Tyler Knaak	Jr
OL	76	Jason Maciejczak	So
OL	77	Gunnar Gottula (injured)	So
OL	78	Jacob Brandl	So
OL	79	Shawn Hammerbeck	Fr
WR	80	Jeremiah Jones	Fr
WR	81	Hayes Miller	So
TE	82	Eric Ingwerson	RFr
WR	84	DJ Singleton	RFr
WR	85	Keelan Smith	RFr
TE	87	Mac Markway (injured)	So
WR	88	Jackson Carpenter	Fr

Defense

Pos.	#	Name	Class
LB	0	Javin Wright	GS
CB	1	Ceyair Wright (C)	Sr
S	3	Marques Buford Jr. (C)	Sr
DL	5	Riley Van-Poppel	So
NB	7	Malcom Hartzog Jr. (injured)	Sr
S	8	DeShon Singleton (C)	Sr
LB	9	Vincent Shavers Jr.	So
CB	10	Andrew Marshall	Jr
DL	11	Cameron Lenhardt	Jr
S	12	Justin Rhett	So
NB	13	Jamir Conn	Jr
CB	14	Amare Sanders	RFr
LB	15	Dasan McCullough	Sr
DL	16	Elijah Jeudy	Sr
LB	17	Willis McGahee IV	So
CB	18	Larry Traver Jr.	RFr
DB	19	Kahmir Prescott	RFr
S	21	Rex Guthrie	RFr
LB	22	Maverick Noonan	So
CB	23	Blye Hill (injured)	So
S	24	Derek Branch	Sr
CB	25	Jeremiah Charles	So
DB	26	Brice Turner	So
S	28	Caleb Benning	RFr
DB	29	Braylen Prude	RFr
S	31	Mario Buford	So
LB	32	Trent Uhlir	RFr
LB	33	Marques Watson-Trent	GS
DB	34	Preston Okafor	RFr
CB	37	Donovan Jones	RFr
DB	38	Thomas D'Onofrio	RFr
DL	39	David Höffken	RFr
DB	39	Bryson Webber	Fr
LB	40	Dawson Merritt	Fr
DB	41	Tanner Terch	Fr
LB	42	Derek Wacker	RFr
LB	43	Michael Booker III	Sr
LB	45	Roger Gradney	RFr
LB	47	Gage Stenger (injured)	Jr
DB	48	Caden VerMaas	Fr
DL	49	Malcolm Simpson	Fr
LB	50	Christian Jones	Fr
LB	52	Dylan Rogers	So
LB	54	Jacob Bower	So
DL	55	Ethan Duda	RFr
LB	56	Pierce Mooberry	Fr
DL	57	Ashton Murphy	RFr
LB	59	Rahmir Stewart	So
DL	69	Landen Davidson	RFr
DL	71	Tyson Terry	Fr
DL	86	Mason Goldman	So
DL	90	Jaylen George	Jr
DL	92	Sua Lefotu	So
DL	93	Kade Pietrzak	Fr
LB	94	Jordan Ochoa	RFr
DL	95	Gabe Moore	So
DL	96	Williams Nwaneri	RFr
DL	97	Keona Davis	So
DL	98	Conor Connealy	So
DL	99	Dylan Parrott	Jr

Special teams

Pos.	#	Name	Class
PK	30	Tristan Alvano	So
P	37	Kamdyn Koch	RFr
LS	46	Kevin Gallic	Sr
P	83	Archie Wilson	Fr
PK	90	John Hohl	So
PK	91	Kyle Cunanan	So
LS	94	Aiden Flege	Sr

Head coach

- Matt Rhule

Coordinators/assistant coaches

- John Butler – Defensive coordinator
- Dana Holgorsen – Offensive coordinator
- Mike Ekeler – Special teams coordinator
- Phil Snow – Associate head coach
- E. J. Barthel – Running backs
- Terry Bradden – Defensive line
- Rob Dvoracek – Linebackers
- Donovan Raiola – Offensive line
- Marcus Satterfield – Tight ends
- Daikiel Shorts Jr. – Wide receivers
- Phil Simpson – Outside linebackers
- Glenn Thomas – Co-offensive coordinator/quarterbacks
- Addison Williams – Defensive backs
- Ron Brown – Assistant coach
- Corey Campbell – Strength and conditioning coach

Legend

- (C) Team captain
- (S) Suspended
- (I) Ineligible
- Injured
- Redshirt

Roster

=== Depth chart ===
Defense

NICKEL
1 Ceyair Wright
13 Jamir Conn
⋅

FS
21 Rex Guthrie
3 Marques Buford
28 Caleb Benning
⋅

JACK	LB	LB
15 Dasan McCullough	9 Vincent Shavers	0 Javin Wright
52 Dylan Rogers	33 Marques Watson-Trent	40 Dawson Meritt
⋅	⋅	⋅

ROVER
8 DeShon Singleton
12 Justyn Rhett
⋅

CB
10 Andrew Marshall
14 Amare Sanders
⋅

DE	NT	DE
11 Cameron Lenhardt	16 Elijah Jeudy	97 Keona Davis
96 Williams Nwaneri	5 Riley Van-Poppel	90 Jaylen George
93 Kade Pietrzak	95 Gabe Moore	39 David Hoffken

CB
37 Donovan Jones
25 Jeremiah Charles
⋅

Offense

WR
6 Dane Key
19 Cortez Mills
⋅

WR
2 Jacory Barney
85 Keelan Smith
⋅

LT	LG	C	RG	RT
57 Elijah Pritchett	59 Henry Lutovsky	51 Justin Evans	50 Rocco Spindler	69 Turner Corcoran; 77 Gunnar Gottula (injured)
69 Turner Corcoran	76 Jason Maciejczak	58 Jake Peters	75 Tyler Knaak	65 Teddy Prochazka (injured)
⋅	⋅	⋅	⋅	⋅

TE
44 Luke Lindenmeyer
10 Heinrich Haarberg
29 Carter Nelson FB-48 Cayden Echternach

WR
13 Nyziah Hunter
18 Quinn Clark
⋅

QB
15 Dylan Raiola (injured) 14 TJ Lateef
12 Jalyn Gramstad
⋅

Key reserves
Season-ending injury' Number of games played ()
WR Janiran Bonner (1)
NB Malcolm Hartzog (2)
OT Teddy Prochazka (7)
OT Gunnar Gottula (7)
QB Dylan Raiola (9)

Special teams
PK Kyle Cunanan
P Archie Wilson
KR Kenneth Williams
PR Jacory Barney
LS Kevin Gallic

RB
21 Emmett Johnson
22 Isaiah Mozee
35 Mekhi Nelson
28 Kwinten Ives
