= 2026 Nebraska Cornhuskers football team =

American college football season

2026 Nebraska Cornhuskers football
- Conference: Big Ten Conference
- Record: 7–4 (4–4 Big Ten)
- Head coach: Matt Rhule (4th season)
- Offensive coordinator: Dana Holgorsen (2nd season; first 9 games)
- Co-offensive coordinator: Glenn Thomas (3rd season)
- Offensive scheme: Power Spread
- Defensive coordinator: Rob Aurich (1st season)
- Base defense: 4–2–5
- Home stadium: Memorial Stadium

Uniform

2026 Big Ten Conference football standings
	Conf.			Overall
Team	W		L	W		L
No. 4 UCLA	7	–	1	10	–	1
No. 8 Indiana	6	–	2	9	–	2
No. 15 Iowa	6	–	2	9	–	2
No. 13 Oregon	6	–	2	8	–	3
No. 18 USC	5	–	3	8	–	3
No. 14 Ohio State	5	–	3	7	–	4
Wisconsin	5	–	3	7	–	4
Nebraska	4	–	4	7	–	4
Washington	4	–	4	7	–	4
Illinois	4	–	4	6	–	5
Minnesota	4	–	4	6	–	5
Michigan	3	–	5	6	–	5
Northwestern	3	–	5	6	–	5
Penn State	3	–	5	6	–	5
Maryland	2	–	6	4	–	7
Purdue	2	–	6	3	–	8
Rutgers	2	–	6	3	–	8
Michigan State	1	–	7	3	–	8
Championship: December 5, 2026
^ – College Football Playoff participant; $ – Conference champion; y – Championship game participant; As of November 22, 2026; Rankings from CFP rankings

The 2026 Nebraska Cornhuskers football team will represent the University of Nebraska–Lincoln as a member of the Big Ten Conference during the 2026 NCAA Division I FBS football season. The Cornhuskers are led by fourth-year head coach Matt Rhule, and they play their home contests at Memorial Stadium located in Lincoln, Nebraska.

== Schedule ==
Date	Time	Opponent	Site	TV	Result	Attendance
September 5	11:00 a.m.	Ohio*	Memorial Stadium; Lincoln, NE	FS1	W 49–21	85,577
September 12	6:00 p.m.	Bowling Green*	Memorial Stadium; Lincoln, NE	FS1	W 56–7	86,193
September 19	6:15 p.m.	No. 6 (FCS) North Dakota*	Memorial Stadium; Lincoln, NE	BTN	W 34–7	86,217
September 26	4:00 p.m.	at Michigan State	Spartan Stadium; East Lansing, MI	BTN	W 31–13	68,161
October 3	3:00 p.m.	Maryland^{†}	Memorial Stadium; Lincoln, NE	FS1	W 48–23	85,033
October 10	11:00 a.m.	No. 7 Indiana	Memorial Stadium; Lincoln, NE (Big Noon Kickoff)	FOX	L 17–20	85,653
October 17	10:00 p.m.	at Oregon	Autzen Stadium; Eugene, OR	FOX	L 14–17	58,391
October 31	7:00 p.m.	Washington	Memorial Stadium; Lincoln, NE	BTN	L 10–17	86,097
November 6	7:00 p.m.	at Illinois	Gies Memorial Stadium; Champaign, IL	FOX	L 13–24	58,587
November 14	11:30 a.m.	at Rutgers	SHI Stadium; Piscataway, NJ	BTN	W 31–0	36,425
November 21	11:00 a.m.	No. 14 Ohio State	Memorial Stadium; Lincoln, NE	FOX	W 31–28	85,699
November 27	11:00 a.m.	at No. 13 Iowa	Kinnick Stadium; Iowa City, IA (Heroes Game)	CBS		
*Non-conference game; ^{†}Homecoming; Rankings from AP Poll (and CFP Rankings, after November 3) – Released prior to game; All times are in Central time; Source:

== Game summaries ==
=== vs. Ohio ===
Ohio Bobcats (0–0) at Nebraska Cornhuskers (0–0) – Game summary

Quarter	1	2	3	4	Total
Bobcats	10	3	0	8	21
Cornhuskers	7	7	14	21	49

at Memorial Stadium • Lincoln, Nebraska

- Date: September 5
- Game time: 11:00 a.m. CDT
- Game weather: Sunny 91 °F (33 °C), Wind East 5 miles per hour (8.0 km/h)
- Game attendance: 85,577
- Referee: Bryan Banks
- TV announcers (FS1): Eric Collins and Spencer Tillman

Game information

First quarter

- (13:49) OHIO – Riley Neer 4-yard pass from Nick Poulos (Will Hryszko kick) (Drive: 3 plays, 75 yards, 01:11, Ohio 7–0)
- (08:19) NEB - Jamal Rule 1-yard run (Kyle Cunanan kick) (Drive 12 plays, 75 yards, 05:30, Tied 7–7)
- (03:16) OHIO - Will Hryszko 42-yard field goal (Drive: 9 plays, 46 yards, 05:03, Ohio 10–7)

Second quarter

- (03:16) OHIO - Will Hryszko 45-yard field goal, (Drive: 11 plays, 51 yards, 04:53, Ohio 13–7)
- (08:13) NEB - Jamal Rule 24-yard pass from Anthony Colandrea (Kyle Cunanan kick) (Drive: 7 plays, 92 yards, 02:14, Nebraska 14–13)

Third quarter

- (04:41) NEB - Anthony Colandrea 13-yard run (Kyle Cunanan kick) (Drive: 11 plays, 73 yards, 05:21, Nebraska 21–13)
- (01:17) NEB - Mekhi Nelson 29-yard run (Kyle Cunanan kick) (Drive: 8 plays, 69yards, 02:29, Nebraska 28–13)

Fourth quarter

- (12:05) OHIO - Nick Poulos 1-yard run (Dom Dorwart pass from Nick Poulos) (Drive: 10 plays, 70 yards, 04:12, Nebraska 28–21)
- (09:10) NEB - Mekhi Nelson 51-yard pass from Anthony Colandrea (Kyle Cunanan kick), (Drive: 6 plays, 75 yards, 02:55, Nebraska 35–21)
- (05:57) NEB - Jamal Rule 11-yard run (Kyle Cunanan kick) (Drive: 5 plays, 70 yards, 02:32, Nebraska 42–21)
- (01:53) NEB - Kwazi Gilmer 9-yard pass from Anthony Colandrea (Kyle Cunanan kick) (Drive: 3 plays, 17 yards, 01:30, Nebraska 49–21)

Statistics	OHIO	NEB
First downs	17	28
Plays–yards	65–303	74–523
Rushes–yards	33–139	42–248
Passing yards	164	275
Passing: comp–att–int	14–32–1	18–32–0
Turnovers	1	0
Time of possession	29:21	30:39

Team	Category	Player	Statistics
Ohio	Passing	Nick Poulos	14/31, 164 yards, TD
Ohio	Rushing	Nick Poulos	10 carries, 72 yards, TD
Ohio	Receiving	Riley Neer	6 receptions, 104 yards, TD
Nebraska	Passing	Anthony Colandrea	18/32, 275 yards, 3 TD
Nebraska	Rushing	Jamal Rule	15 carries, 122 yards, 2 TD
Nebraska	Receiving	Jacory Barney Jr.	5 receptions, 60 yards

=== vs. Bowling Green ===
Bowling Green Falcons (0–1) at Nebraska Cornhuskers (1–0) – Game summary

Quarter	1	2	3	4	Total
Falcons	0	0	0	7	7
Cornhuskers	14	21	0	21	56

at Memorial Stadium • Lincoln, Nebraska

- Date: September 12
- Game time: 6:00 p.m. CDT
- Game weather: Cloudy, 70 degrees, Wind NE @ 6 mph
- Game attendance: 86,193
- Referee: Jason Nickleby
- TV announcers (FS1): Eric Collins and Spencer Tillman

Game information

First quarter

- (7:34) NEB – Jacory Barney Jr. 35-yard pass from Anthony Colandrea (Kyle Cunanan kick) (Drive: 9 plays, 59 yards, 04:19, Nebraska 7–0)
- (0:32) NEB – Kwazi Gilmer 12-yard pass from Anthony Colandrea (Kyle Cunanan kick) (Drive: 7 plays, 38 yards, 04:04, Nebraska 14–0)

Second quarter

- (8:36) NEB – Kwazi Gilmer 4-yard pass from Anthony Colandrea (Kyle Cunanan kick) (Drive: 9 plays, 77 yards, 04:45, Nebraska 21–0)
- (5:16) NEB – Jamal Rule 59-yard run (Kyle Cunanan kick) (Drive: 3 plays, 73 yards, 01:12, Nebraska 28–0)
- (1:54) NEB – Jacory Barney Jr. 32-yard pass from Anthony Colandrea (Kyle Cunanan kick) (Drive: 5 plays, 79 yards, 02:20, Nebraska 35–0)

Third quarter

- No scoring plays.

Fourth quarter

- (14:53) BGSU – Leo Kemp 19-yard pass from Jay Kastantin (Treyton Kenner kick) (Drive: 6 plays, 63 yards, 03:34, Nebraska 35-7)
- (10:30) NEB – Isaiah Mozee 7-yard run (Kyle Cunanan kick) (Drive: 9 plays, 60 yards, 04:15, Nebraska 42-7)
- (9:29) NEB – Derek Wacker 25-yard fumble return (Kyle Cunanan kick) (Nebraska 49-7)
- (1:18) NEB – Kwinten Ives 6-yard pass from TJ Lateef (Kyle Cunanan kick) (Drive: 12 plays, 79 yards, 05:39, Nebraska 56-7)

Statistics	BGSU	NEB
First downs	9	28
Plays–yards	48–169	66–546
Rushes–yards	32–85	34–264
Passing yards	84	282
Passing: comp–att–int	10–16–1	26–32–1
Turnovers	2	1
Time of possession	28:19	31:41

Team	Category	Player	Statistics
Bowling Green	Passing	Jay Kastantin	10/16, 84 yards, TD, INT
Bowling Green	Rushing	Nakai Amachree	13 carries, 53 yards
Bowling Green	Receiving	Leo Kemp	1 reception, 19 yards, TD
Nebraska	Passing	Anthony Colandrea	20/24, 222 yards, 4 TD, INT
Nebraska	Rushing	Jamal Rule	8 carries, 88 yards, TD
Nebraska	Receiving	Jacory Barney Jr.	8 receptions, 115 yards, 2 TD

=== vs. No. 6 (FCS) North Dakota ===
No. 6 (FCS) North Dakota Fighting Hawks (3–0) at Nebraska Cornhuskers (2–0) – Game summary

Quarter	1	2	3	4	Total
No. 6 (FCS) Fighting Hawks	0	0	7	0	7
Cornhuskers	14	3	7	10	34

at Memorial Stadium • Lincoln, Nebraska

- Date: September 19
- Game time: 6:15 p.m. CDT
- Game weather: Cloudy, 75 degrees, Wind North @ 8 mph
- Game attendance: 86,217
- Referee: Francisco Villar
- TV announcers (BTN): Jason Ross Jr., Anthony Herron and Bridget Howard

Game information

First quarter

- (10:31) NEB – Anthony Colandrea 10-yard rush (Kyle Cunanan kick) (Drive: 10 plays, 75 yards, 04:29, Nebraska 7–0)
- (0:54) NEB – Jamal Rule 3-yard rush (Kyle Cunanan kick) (Drive: 11 plays, 90 yards, 05:54, Nebraska 14–0)

Second quarter

- (0:36) NEB – Kyle Cunanan 32-yard field goal (Drive: 9 plays, 71 yards, 03:21, Nebraska 17–0)

Third quarter

- (13:57) NEB - Jamal Rule 55-yard rush (Kyle Cunanan kick) (Drive: 1 play, 55 yards, 00:11, Nebraska 24-0)
- (5:49) UND - Caleb Goodloe 7-yard pass from Jerry Kaminski (Kenten Laaughman kick) (Drive: 12 plays, 62 yards, 04:46, Nebraska 24-7)

Fourth quarter

- (14:55) NEB – Quinn Clark 5-yard pass from Anthony Colandrea (Kyle Cunanan kick) (Drive: 11 plays, 75 yards, 05:54, Nebraska 31-7)
- (1:51) NEB – Kyle Cunanan 40-yard field goal (Drive: 6 plays, 36 yards, 02:25, Nebraska 34-7)

Statistics	UND	NEB
First downs	10	22
Plays–yards	55–205	71–493
Rushes–yards	36–99	45–277
Passing yards	106	216
Passing: comp–att–int	9–19–0	18–26–0
Turnovers	0	0
Time of possession	24:15	35:45

Team	Category	Player	Statistics
North Dakota	Passing	Jerry Kaminski	9/18, 106 yards, TD
North Dakota	Rushing	Jerry Kaminski	14 carries, 48 yards
North Dakota	Receiving	Deng Deng	4 receptions, 59 yards
Nebraska	Passing	Anthony Colandrea	15/21, 195 yards, TD
Nebraska	Rushing	Jamal Rule	15 carries, 119 yards, 2 TD
Nebraska	Receiving	Kwazi Gilmer	3 receptions, 42 yards

=== at Michigan State ===
Nebraska Cornhuskers (3–0) at Michigan State Spartans (2–1) – Game summary

Quarter	1	2	3	4	Total
Cornhuskers	7	17	0	7	31
Spartans	3	7	3	0	13

at Spartan Stadium • East Lansing, Michigan

- Date: September 26
- Game time: 4:00 p.m. CDT
- Game weather: Sunny, 72 degrees, Wind SW @ 8 mph
- Game attendance: 68,161
- Referee: Jeff Servinski
- TV announcers (BTN): Jeff Levering, Jake Butt and Brooke Fletcher

Game information

First Quarter

- (5:10) MSU – Liam Boyd 48-yard field goal (Drive: 11 plays, 51 yards, 06:04, Michigan State 3–0)
- (1:45) NEB – Kwazi Gilmer 44-yard pass from Anthony Colandrea (Kyle Cunanan kick) (Drive: 6 plays, 75 yards, 03:25, Nebraska 7-3)

Second Quarter

- (11:54) NEB – Mekhi Nelson 4-yard rush (Kyle Cunanan kick) (Drive: 8 plays, 79 yards, 03:11, Nebraska 14-3)
- (10:00) NEB - Kyle Cunanan 32-yard field goal (Drive: 5 play, 15 yards, 01:11, Nebraska 17-3)
- (6:07) MSU - Jaziun Patterson 2-yard rush (Liam Boyd kick) (Drive: 10 plays, 79 yards, 03:49, Nebraska 17-10)
- (0:02) NEB - Vincent Genatone 13-yard pass from Anthony Colandrea (Kyle Cunanan kick) (Drive: 14 plays, 74 yards, 5:58, Nebraska 24-10)

Third Quarter

- (10:02) MSU - Liam Boyd 46-yard field goal (Drive: 9 plays, 34 yards, 4:12, Nebraska 24-13)

Fourth Quarter

- (10:05) NEB – Vincent Genatone 1-yard rush (Kyle Cunanan kick) (Drive: 12 plays, 66 yards, 06:22, Nebraska 31-13)

Statistics	NEB	MSU
First downs	22	22
Plays–yards	68–369	60–257
Rushes–yards	41–157	32–39
Passing yards	212	218
Passing: comp–att–int	15–17–0	19–28–1
Turnovers	0	3
Time of possession	30:19	29:41

Team	Category	Player	Statistics
Nebraska	Passing	Anthony Colandrea	15/27, 212 yards, 2 TD
Nebraska	Rushing	Anthony Colandrea	10 carries, 66 yards
Nebraska	Receiving	Kwazi Gilmer	4 receptions, 101 yards, TD
Michigan State	Passing	Alessio Milivojevic	18/26, 208 yards, INT
Michigan State	Rushing	Jaziun Patterson	16 carries, 54 yards, TD
Michigan State	Receiving	Chrishon McCray	4 receptions, 47 yards

=== vs. Maryland ===
Maryland Terrapins (2–2) at Nebraska Cornhuskers (4–0) – Game summary

Quarter	1	2	3	4	Total
Terrapins	16	7	0	0	23
Cornhuskers	7	21	0	20	48

at Memorial Stadium • Lincoln, Nebraska

- Date: October 3
- Game time: 3:00 p.m. CDT
- Game weather: Sunny, 69 degrees, Wind SW @ 12 mph
- Game attendance: 85,033
- Referee: Jim Wharrie
- TV announcers (FS1): Dan Hellie and Robert Smith

Game information

First Quarter

- (12:15) MD – Sean O'Haire 26-yard field goal (Drive: 9 plays, 67 yards, 02:45, Maryland 3–0)
- (9:11) NEB – Mekhi Nelson 19-yard rush (Kyle Cunanan kick) (Drive: 1 plays, 19 yards, 0:07, Nebraska 7-3)
- (8:33) MD - Chris Durr Jr. 65-yard pass from Malik Washington (Sean O'Haire kick) (Drive: 3 plays, 75 yards, 0:38, Maryland 10-7)
- (4:12) MD - Sean O'Haire 42-yard field goal (Drive: 7 plays, 37 yards, 2:54, Maryland 13-7)
- (2:22) MD - Sean O'Haire 32-yard field goal (Drive: 4 plays, 5 yards, 1:01, Maryland 16-7)

Second Quarter

- (12:37) NEB – Mekhi Nelson 5-yard rush (Kyle Cunanan kick) (Drive: 10 plays, 79 yards, 04:40, Maryland 16-14)
- (8:54) MD - DeJuan Williams 3-yard rush (Sean O'Haire kick) (Drive: 2 play, 59 yards, 0:31, Maryland 23-14)
- (2:41) NEB - Dwayne McDougle 81-yard interception return (Kyle Cunanan kick) (03:24, Maryland 23-21)
- (0:05) NEB - Luke Lindenmeyer 1-yard pass from Anthony Colandrea (Kyle Cunanan kick) (Drive: 8 plays, 80 yards, 1:44, Nebraska 28-23)

Third Quarter

- (No Scoring)

Fourth Quarter

- (14:58) NEB – Vincent Genatone 1-yard rush (Kyle Cunanan kick) (Drive: 11 plays, 58 yards, 4:36, Nebraska 35-23)
- (10:32) NEB - Kwazi Gilmer 5-yard pass from Anthony Colandrea (Kyle Cunanan kick) (Drive: 5 plays, 85 yards, 2:31, Nebraska 42-23)
- (6:35) NEB - Kwazi Gilmer 30-yard pass from Anthony Colandrea (Kyle Cunanan kick missed) (Drive: 5 plays, 43 yards, 2:52, Nebraska 48-23)

Statistics	MD	NEB
First downs	19	28
Plays–yards	69–395	75–447
Rushes–yards	25–141	36–209
Passing yards	254	238
Passing: comp–att–int	23–44–2	26–39–1
Turnovers	2	1
Time of possession	25:36	34:24

Team	Category	Player	Statistics
Maryland	Passing	Malik Washington	23/44, 254 yards, TD, 2 INT
Maryland	Rushing	DeJuan Williams	10 carries, 78 yards, TD
Maryland	Receiving	Chris Durr Jr	7 receptions, 149 yards, TD
Nebraska	Passing	Anthony Colandrea	26/39, 238 yards, 3 TD, INT
Nebraska	Rushing	Anthony Colandrea	10 carries, 108 yards
Nebraska	Receiving	Kwazi Gilmer	11 receptions, 147 yards, 2 TD

=== vs. No. 7 Indiana ===
No. 7 Indiana Hoosiers (5–0) at Nebraska Cornhuskers (5–0) – Game summary

Quarter	1	2	3	4	Total
No. 7 Hoosiers	3	0	3	14	20
Cornhuskers	10	0	0	7	17

at Memorial Stadium • Lincoln, Nebraska

- Date: October 10
- Game time: 11:00 a.m. CDT
- Game weather: Sunny, 77 degrees, Wind SW @ 20 mph
- Game attendance: 85,653
- Referee: Kole Knueppel
- TV announcers (FOX): Gus Johnson, Joel Klatt, and Jenny Taft

Game information

First Quarter

- (8:57) NEB – Kyle Cunanan 28-yard field goal (Drive: 13 plays, 66 yards, 06:03, Nebraska 3–0)
- (6:21) IU – Nico Radicic 42-yard field goal (Drive: 6 plays, 51 yards, 2:36, 3-3)
- (1:01) NEB - Nyziah Hunter 10-yard rush (Kyle Cunanan kick) (Drive: 10 plays, 75 yards, 5:20, Nebraska 10-3)

Second Quarter

- (No Scoring)

Third Quarter

- (10:26) IND - Nico Radicic 35-yard field goal (Drive: 10 plays, 58 yards, 4:34, Nebraska 10-6)

Fourth Quarter

- (12:01) NEB – Anthony Colandrea 39-yard rush (Kyle Cunanan kick) (Drive: 5 plays, 71 yards, 2:11, Nebraska 17-6)
- (11:51) IU - Nick Marsh 75-yard pass from Josh Hoover (Nico Radicic kick) (Drive: 1 plays, 75 yards, 0:10, Nebraska 17-13)
- (7:13) IU - Nick Marsh 44-yard pass from Josh Hoover (Nico Radicic kick) (Drive: 5 plays, 80 yards, 2:11, Indiana 20-17)

Statistics	IU	NEB
First downs	13	25
Plays–yards	44-328	83-392
Rushes–yards	22-65	39-128
Passing yards	263	264
Passing: comp–att–int	12-22-0	25-44-1
Time of possession	20:27	39:33

Team	Category	Player	Statistics
Indiana	Passing	Josh Hoover	12-22, 263 yds, 2 TD
Indiana	Rushing	Lee Beebe Jr.	9 car, 31 yds
Indiana	Receiving	Nick Marsh	6 rec, 187 yds, 2 TD
Nebraska	Passing	Anthony Colandrea	25-43, 264 yds, 1 INT
Nebraska	Rushing	Jamal Rule	15 car, 53 yds
Nebraska	Receiving	Jacory Barney Jr.	9 rec, 108 yds

=== at Oregon ===
Nebraska Cornhuskers (5–1) at Oregon Ducks (3–2) – Game summary

Quarter	1	2	3	4	Total
Cornhuskers	0	7	7	0	14
Ducks	0	0	6	11	17

at Autzen Stadium • Eugene, Oregon

- Date: October 17
- Game time: 10:00 p.m.
- Game weather: Clear, 57 degrees, Wind N @ 9 mph
- Game attendance: 58,391
- Referee: Jason Nickleby
- TV announcers (FOX): Tim Brando, Devin Gardner, and Josh Sims

Game information

First Quarter

(No Scoring)

Second Quarter

- (0:04) NEB – Kwazi Gilmer 17-yard pass from Anthony Colandrea (Kyle Cunanan kick) (Drive: 10 plays, 65 yards, 01:42, Nebraska 7–0)

Third Quarter

- (12:09) ORE - Gage Hurych 36-yard field goal (Drive: 4 plays, 1 yard, 1:20, Nebraska 7-3)
- (7:16) ORE - Gage Hurych 36-yard field goal (Drive: 8 plays, 39 yards, 3:45, Nebraska 7-6)
- (0:07) NEB - Anthony Colandrea 6-yard rush (Kyle Cunanan kick) (Drive: 6 plays, 52 yards, 4:06, Nebraska 14-6)

Fourth Quarter

- (7:18) ORE – Gage Hurych 37-yard field goal (Drive: 17 plays, 69 yards, 7:42, Nebraska 14-9)
- (0:28) ORE - Jamari Johnson 4-yard pass from Dylan Raiola (Hudson Lewis 2-pt PAT pass from Dylan Raiola) (Drive: 20 plays, 82 yards, 5:03, Oregon 17-14)

Statistics	NEB	ORE
First downs	14	15
Plays–yards	67-242	76-242
Rushes–yards	33-78	38-129
Passing yards	164	113
Passing: comp–att–int	18-34-1	20-38-1
Time of possession	29:37	30:23

Team	Category	Player	Statistics
Nebraska	Passing	Anthony Colandrea	18-33, 164 yds, 1 TD, 1 INT
Nebraska	Rushing	Anthony Colandrea	13 rush, 38 yds, 1 TD
Nebraska	Receiving	Kwazi Gilmer	6 rec, 74 yds, 1 TD
Oregon	Passing	Dylan Raiola	11-18, 59 yds, 1 TD
Oregon	Rushing	Dierre Hill Jr	14 rush, 67 yds
Oregon	Receiving	Dakorien Moore	7 rec, 36 yds

=== vs. Washington ===
Washington Huskies (4–3) at Nebraska Cornhuskers (5–2) – Game summary

Quarter	1	2	3	4	Total
Huskies	0	3	0	14	17
Cornhuskers	7	0	0	3	10

at Memorial Stadium • Lincoln, Nebraska

- Date: October 31
- Game time: 7:00 p.m.
- Game weather: Cloudy, 60 degrees, Wind East @ 5 mph
- Game attendance: 86,097
- Referee: Francisco Villar
- TV announcers (BTN): Wayne Randazzo, Rhett Lewis, and Caroline Hendershot

Game information

First Quarter

- (1:40) NEB - Carter Nelson 24-yard pass from Anthony Colandrea (Kyle Cunanan kick) (Drive: 10 plays, 95 yards, 4:18, Nebraska 7-0)

Second Quarter

- (0:41) WASH – Tyler Robles 50-yard field goal (Drive: 9 plays, 56 yards, 01:12, Nebraska 7–3)

Third Quarter

(No Scoring)

Fourth Quarter

- (1:30) WASH – Chris Lawson 25-yard pass from Demond Williams (Tyler Robles kick) (Drive: 12 plays, 81 yards, 2:59, Washington 10-7)
- (1:15) WASH - Alex McLaughlin 48-yard interception return (Tyler Robles kick) (0:15, Washington 17-7)
- (0:31) NEB - John Hohl 42-yard field goal (Drive: 7 plays, 39 yards, 0:36, Washington 17-10)

Statistics	WASH	NEB
First downs	17	21
Plays–yards	62-267	74-387
Rushes–yards	19-32	29-132
Passing yards	235	255
Passing: comp–att–int	26-43-0	24-45-3
Time of possession	29:18	30:42

Team	Category	Player	Statistics
Washington	Passing	Elijah Brown	19-30, 136 yds
Washington	Rushing	Demond Williams Jr.	4 car, 28 yds
Washington	Receiving	Chris Lawson	12 rec, 155 yds, 1 TD
Nebraska	Passing	Anthony Colandrea	24-44, 255 yds, 1 TD, 3 INT
Nebraska	Rushing	Jamal Rule	13 car, 72 yds
Nebraska	Receiving	Jacory Barney Jr.	6 rec, 65 yds

=== at Illinois ===
Nebraska Cornhuskers (5–3) at Illinois Fighting Illini (5–3) – Game summary

Quarter	1	2	3	4	Total
Cornhuskers	0	7	0	6	13
Fighting Illini	0	7	7	10	24

at Gies Memorial Stadium • Champaign, Illinois

- Date: November 6
- Game time: 7:00 p.m. CST
- Game weather: Clear, 37 degrees, Wind NW @ 6 mph
- Game attendance: 58,587
- Referee: Kole Knueppel
- TV announcers (FOX): Jack Kizer and Mark Helfrich

Game information

First Quarter

(No Scoring Plays)

Second Quarter

- (9:29) NEB - Mekhi Nelson 15-yard run (John Hohl kick) (Drive: 10 plays, 98 yards, 4:16, Nebraska 7-0)
- (1:48) ILL – Collin Dixon 3-yard pass from Katin Houser (Ethan Moczulski kick) (Drive: 7 plays, 73 yards, 02:44, 7-7)

Third Quarter

- (8:33) ILL - Jordan Anderson 5-yard pass from Katin Houser (Ethan Moczulski kick) (Drive: 13 plays, 75 yards, 6:27, Illinois 14-7)

Fourth Quarter

- (13:38) ILL – Collin Dixon 6-yard pass from Katin Houser (Ethan Moczulski kick) (Drive: 8 plays, 74 yards, 4:11, Illinois 21-7)
- (10:44) NEB - Jacory Barney Jr. 51-yard pass from Anthony Colandrea (Quinn Clark pass from Anthony Colandrea failed) (7 plays, 91 yards, 2:48, Illinois 21-13)
- (7:51) ILL - Ethan Moczulski 21-yard field goal (Drive: 10 plays, 76 yards, 2:48, Illinois 24-13)

Statistics	NEB	ILL
First downs	25	19
Plays–yards	74-426	65-376
Rushes–yards	31-142	29-84
Passing yards	284	292
Passing: comp–att–int	32-43-0	22-36-0
Time of possession	31:57	28:03

Team	Category	Player	Statistics
Nebraska	Passing	Anthony Colandrea	32-43, 284 yds, 1 TD
Nebraska	Rushing	Jamal Rule	15 car, 69 yds
Nebraska	Receiving	Jacory Barney Jr.	6 rec, 93 yds, 1 TD
Illinois	Passing	Katin Houser	22-36, 292 yds, 3 TD
Illinois	Rushing	Aidan Laughery	11 car, 55 yds
Illinois	Receiving	Collin Dixon	8 rec, 129 yds, 2 TD

=== at Rutgers ===
Nebraska Cornhuskers (5–4) at Rutgers Scarlet Knights (2–7) – Game summary

Quarter	1	2	3	4	Total
Cornhuskers	7	7	7	10	31
Scarlet Knights	0	0	0	0	0

at SHI Stadium • Piscataway, New Jersey

- Date: November 14
- Game time: 11:30 a.m.
- Game weather: Sunny, 44 degrees, Wind West @ 9 mph
- Game attendance: 36,425
- Referee: Jim Wharrie
- TV announcers (BTN): Jeff Levering, Jake Butt, and Brooke Fletcher

Game information

First Quarter

- (0:20) NEB - Luke Lindenmeyer 15-yard pass from Anthony Colandrea (John Hohl kick) (Drive: 16 plays, 94 yards, 9:17, Nebraska 7-0)

Second Quarter

- (1:55) NEB - Anthony Colandrea 6-yard run (John Hohl kick) (Drive: 10 plays, 90 yards, 4:57, Nebraska 14-0)

Third Quarter

- (8:37) NEB - Mekhi Nelson 11-yard run (John Hohl kick) (Drive: 5 plays, 51 yards, 2:17, Nebraska 21-0)

Fourth Quarter

- (14:30) NEB – Carter Nelson 13-yard pass from Anthony Colandrea (John Hohl kick) (Drive: 5 plays, 57 yards, 1:31, Nebraska 28-0)
- (9:45) NEB - John Hohl 41-yard field goal (Drive: 8 plays, 43 yards, 3:16, Nebraska 31-0)

Statistics	NEB	RUTG
First downs	26	10
Plays–yards	68-429	49-143
Rushes–yards	43-237	33-101
Passing yards	192	42
Passing: comp–att–int	16-25-0	7-16-2
Time of possession	33:09	26:51

Team	Category	Player	Statistics
Nebraska	Passing	Anthony Colandrea	15-22, 188 yds, 2 TD
Nebraska	Rushing	Jamal Rule	22 car, 103 yds
Nebraska	Receiving	Carter Nelson	2 rec, 53 yds, 1 TD
Rutgers	Passing	AJ Surace	4-12, 24 yds, 2 INT
Rutgers	Rushing	Clay Thevenin	10 car, 43 yds
Rutgers	Receiving	Dyzier Carter	2 rec, 15 yds

=== vs. No. 14 Ohio State ===
No. 14 Ohio State Buckeyes (7–3) at Nebraska Cornhuskers (6–4) – Game summary

Quarter	1	2	3	4	Total
No. 14 Buckeyes	7	7	7	7	28
Cornhuskers	7	14	0	10	31

at Memorial Stadium • Lincoln, Nebraska

- Date: November 21
- Game time: 11:00 a.m.
- Game weather: Cloudy, 55 degrees, Wind NW @ 15 mph
- Game attendance: 85,699
- Referee: Jason Nickleby
- TV announcers (FOX): Gus Johnson, Joel Klatt, and Jenny Taft

Game information

First Quarter

- (11:43) OSU - Jeremiah Smith 67-yard pass from Luke Fahey 9 (Connor Hawkins kick) (Drive: 3 plays, 73 yards, 0:56, Ohio State 7-0)
- (5:49) NEB - Luke Lindenmeyer 11-yard pass from Anthony Colandrea (John Hohl kick) (Drive: 13 plays, 63 yards, 5:49, 7-7)

Second Quarter

- (11:44) NEB - Kwazi Gilmer 7-yard pass from Anthony Colandrea (John Hohl kick) (Drive: 13 plays, 70 yards, 7:07, Nebraska 14-7)
- (4:12) NEB - Anthony Colandrea 13-yard run (John Hohl kick) (Drive: 9 plays, 47 yards, 4:34, Nebraska 21-7)
- (0:55) OSU - Jeremiah Smith 31-yard pass from Luke Fahey (Connor Hawkins kick) (Drive: 7 plays, 74 yards, 3:13, Nebraska 21-14)

Third Quarter

- (6:37) OSU - Bo Jackson 1-yard run (Connor Hawkins kick) (Drive: 14 plays, 76 yards, 8:20, 21-21)

Fourth Quarter

- (13:42) NEB – John Hohl 33-yard field goal (Drive: 6 plays, 23 yards, 2:16, Nebraska 24-21)
- (7:41) NEB - Quinn Clark 26-yard pass from Anthony Colandrea (John Hohl kick) (Drive: 9 plays, 51 yards, 5:05, Nebraska 31-21)
- (3:52) OSU - Bo Jackson 1-yard run (Connor Hawkins kick) (Drive: 10 plays, 75 yards, 3:49, Nebraska 31-28)

Statistics	OSU	NEB
First downs	16	23
Plays–yards	49-335	73-376
Rushes–yards	22-76	45-176
Passing yards	259	200
Passing: comp–att–int	16-27-1	19-28-0
Time of possession	24:55	35:05

Team	Category	Player	Statistics
Ohio State	Passing	Luke Fahey	16-27, 259 yds, 2 TD, 1 INT
Ohio State	Rushing	Bo Jackson	12 car, 52 yds, 2 TD
Ohio State	Receiving	Jeremiah Smith	6 rec, 165 yds, 2 TD
Nebraska	Passing	Anthony Colandrea	19-28, 200 yds, 3 TD
Nebraska	Rushing	Jamal Rule	23 rush, 70 yds
Nebraska	Receiving	Kwazi Gilmer	7 rec, 73 yds, TD

=== at No. 10 Iowa ===
Nebraska Cornhuskers (7–4) at Iowa Hawkeyes (9–2) – Game summary

Quarter	1	2	3	4	Total
Cornhuskers	0	0	0	0	0
No. 10 Hawkeyes	0	0	0	0	0

at Kinnick Stadium • Iowa City, Iowa

- Date: November 27
- Game time: 11:00 a.m. CST
- TV announcers (CBS): Rich Waltz, Adam Breneman, Brian Kelly, and Jordan Giorgio

Statistics	NEB	IOWA
First downs		
Plays–yards		
Rushes–yards		
Passing yards		
Passing: comp–att–int		
Time of possession		

Team	Category	Player	Statistics
Nebraska	Passing		
Nebraska	Rushing		
Nebraska	Receiving		
Iowa	Passing		
Iowa	Rushing		
Iowa	Receiving		

== Big Ten awards ==
=== Player of the week honors ===
Weekly awards
Player	Award	Week awarded	Ref.
Jamal Rule	Big Ten Freshman of the Week	Week 1	
Anthony Colandrea	Big Ten Offensive Player of the Week	Week 2	

== Personnel ==
=== Roster ===
2026 Nebraska Cornhuskers football team roster
Players
Coaches
Offense

Pos.	#	Name	Class
WR	1	Nyziah Hunter	Jr
WR	2	Jacory Barney Jr.	Jr
WR	3	Kwazi Gilmer	Jr
SWISS	4	Janiran Bonner	Sr
WR	6	Roman Mangini	Sr
TE	8	Luke Lindenmeyer	Sr
QB	10	Anthony Colandrea	Sr
WR	11	Demitrius Bell	Jr
QB	12	Daniel Kaelin	So
RB	13	Mekhi Nelson	So
QB	14	TJ Lateef	So
WR	15	Keelan Smith	So
QB	16	Bode Soukup	So
WR	17	Larry Miles (injured)	Fr
WR	18	Quinn Clark	So
WR	19	Cortez Mills	So
RB	21	Kwinten Ives	Jr
RB	22	Isaiah Mozee	So
RB	23	Conor Booth	RFr
WR	24	Nalin Scott	Fr
RB	25	Jamal Rule	Fr
TE	29	Carter Nelson	Jr
RB	30	Vincent Genatone (injured)	Sr
TE	41	Luke Sorensen	Fr
TE	48	Cayden Echternach	Jr
TE	49	Danny King	So
OL	50	Hayden Ainsworth	Fr
OL	51	Justin Evans	Sr
OL	54	Brendan Black	Sr
OL	55	Tree Babalade	Jr
OL	56	Ashton Murphy	So
OL	57	Elijah Pritchett	Sr
OL	58	Jake Peters	So
OL	62	Sam Sledge	Jr
OL	65	Paul Mubenga	Jr
OL	66	Grant Brix	So
OL	68	Preston Taumua	So
OL	70	Nolan Fennessy	So
OL	71	Claude Mpouma	Fr
OL	72	Gibson Pyle	So
OL	74	Brock Knutson	Jr
OL	75	Tyler Knaak	Sr
OL	76	Rex Waterman	Fr
OL	77	Gunnar Gottula	Jr
OL	78	Jacob Brandl	Jr
WR	81	Hayes Miller	So
TE	82	Eric Ingwerson	So
WR	84	DJ Singleton	So
WR	85	Jamari Brown	Fr
TE	87	Shawn Hammerback	RFr
WR	88	Jackson Carpenter	RFr
WR	89	Maurice Purify II	Fr

Defense

Pos.	#	Name	Class
LB	0	Owen Chambliss	Sr
DT	1	Jahsear Whittington	So
DE	2	Cameron Lenhardt	Sr
S	4	Jamir Conn	Sr
DE	5	Anthony Jones (injured)	Sr
CB	7	Andrew Marshall	Sr
NB	8	Donovan Jones	So
LB	10	Vincent Shavers Jr.	Jr
CB	11	Larry Traver Jr.	So
S	12	Justyn Rhett	Jr
S	13	Rex Guthrie	So
CB	14	Amare Sanders	So
CB	16	Danny Odem	Fr
DE	17	Willis McGahee IV	So
CB	19	Kahmir Prescott (injured)	So
S	21	Jasin Shiggs	Jr
CB	22	Victor Evans	Sr
CB	23	Byle Hill	Jr
LB	24	Dexter Foster	Jr
CB	25	Jeremiah Charles	Jr
S	26	Dwayne McDougle	Sr
S	28	Caleb Benning	So
CB	29	Braylen Prude	So
S	30	Tanner Terch	RFr
NB	31	Mario Buford	So
LB	32	Trent Uhlir	So
DE	33	Jeremiah Jones	RFr
DT	34	Owen Stoudmire	GS
LB	35	Christian Jones	RFr
S	36	Rowdy Bauer	So
S	38	Thomas D'Onofrio	So
CB	39	Bryson Webber	RFr
LB	40	Dawson Merritt	So
LB	42	Derek Wacker	So
LB	43	Will Hawthorne	RFr
DT	44	Riley Van-Poppel	Jr
LB	45	Dylan Rogers	Jr
LB	47	Gage Stenger	Sr
DT	49	Malcolm Simpson	RFr
DE	51	Ethan Duda	So
LB	52	Jase Reynolds	Fr
DT	53	David Höffken	So
LB	54	Jacob Bower (injured)	Jr
LB	56	Pierce Mooberry	RFr
DT	69	Landen Davidson	So
DT	71	Tyson Terry	RFr
DE	86	Mason Goldman	Jr
DT	90	Dylan Berymon	Fr
DT	92	Sua Lefotu	Jr
DE	93	Kade Pietrzak	So
DE	94	Jordan Ochoa	So
DT	95	Gabe Moore (injured)	Jr
DE	96	Williams Nwaneri	So
DE	97	Mac Markway	Jr
DE	98	Connor Connealy	Jr
DT	99	Dylan Parrott	Sr

Special teams

Pos.	#	Name	Class
LS	50	Kyson Gana	Fr
P	37	Kamdyn Koch	So
P	83	Archie Wilson	So
LS	87	Jack Wills	So
PK	90	John Hohl	Jr
PK	91	Kyle Cunanan	Jr
PK	84	Michael Sarikizis	Fr

Head coach

- Matt Rhule

Coordinators/assistant coaches

- Dana Holgorsen – Offensive coordinator
- Glenn Thomas – Co-offensive coordinator/quarterbacks
- E. J. Barthel – Running backs
- Daikiel Shorts Jr. – Wide receivers
- Marcus Satterfield – Tight ends
- Geep Wade – Offensive line
- Lonnie Teasley – Run Game Coordinator
- Rob Aurich – Defensive coordinator
- Corey Brown – Defensive Line
- Roy Manning – Defensive Edges
- Rob Dvoracek – Linebackers
- Addison Williams – Defensive Backs
- Tyler Yelk – Safeties
- Brett Maher – Special teams coordinator
- Phil Snow – Associate head coach
- Jamar Mozee – Assistant Head coach
- Phil Simpson – Assistant coach
- Ron Brown – Assistant coach
- Corey Campbell – Strength and conditioning coach

Legend

- (C) Team captain
- (S) Suspended
- (I) Ineligible
- Injured
- Redshirt

Roster

=== Depth Chart ===
Defense

NICKEL
8 Donovan Jones
31 Mario Buford
⋅

FS
4 Jamir Conn
28 Caleb Benning
⋅

LB	LB
10 Vincent Shavers	0 Owen Chambliss
24 Dexter Foster	40 Dawson Merritt
⋅	⋅

SS
26 Dwayne McDougle III
13 Rex Guthrie
⋅

CB
7 Andrew Marshall
16 Danny Odem III
⋅

DE	DT	DT	DE
96 Williams Nwaneri	34 Owen Stoudmire	1 Jahsear Whittington	5 Anthony Jones Jr (injured); 2 Cameron Lenhardt
93 Kade Pietrzak	44 Riley Van-Poppel	71 Tyson Terry	94 Jordan Ochoa
⋅	⋅	⋅	⋅

CB
22 Victor Evans III
25 Jeremiah Charles
⋅

Offense

WR
3 Kwazi Gilmer
19 Cortez Mills Jr.
⋅

WR
2 Jacory Barney Jr.
15 Keelan Smith
11 Demetrius Bell

LT	LG	C	RG	RT
57 Elijah Pritchett	65 Paul Mubenga; 77 Gunnar Gottula	51 Justin Evans	54 Brendan Black	55 Tree Babalade
50 Hayden Ainsworth	75 Tyler Knaak	62 Sam Sledge	72 Gibson Pyle	68 Preston Taumua
⋅	⋅	⋅	⋅	⋅

TE
8 Luke Lindenmeyer
4 Janiran Bonner
29 Carter Nelson

WR
1 Nyziah Hunter
18 Quinn Clark
⋅

QB
10 Anthony Colandrea
14 TJ Lateef
⋅

Key reserves
Season-ending injury' Number of games played ()
RB 30 Vince Genatone (6)

Special teams
PK 91 Kyle Cunanan
PK 90 John Hohl Kickoffs
P 83 Archie Wilson
KR 22 Isiah Mozee
PR 2 Jacory Barney
LS 87 Jack Wills
H 37 Kamdyn Koch Punter

RB
25 Jamal Rule
13 Mekhi Nelson
22 Isaiah Mozee
⋅
