= 2025 Las Vegas Bowl =

Postseason college football bowl game

2025 SRS Distribution Las Vegas Bowl
- 33rd Las Vegas Bowl
Nebraska Cornhuskers	Utah Utes
(7–5)	(10–2)
Big Ten	Big 12
22	44
Head coach: Matt Rhule	Head coach: Morgan Scalley
AP / Coaches / CFP; NR / NR / NR	AP / Coaches / CFP; 15 / 15 / 15
	1	2	3	4	Total
Nebraska	14	0	0	8	22
Utah	7	17	14	6	44
- Date: December 31, 2025
- Season: 2025
- Stadium: Allegiant Stadium
- Location: Paradise, Nevada
- MVP: Devon Dampier (QB, Utah)
- Favorite: Utah by 14
- Referee: Jason Autrey (SEC)
- Attendance: 38,879

United States TV coverage
- Network: ESPN
- Announcers: Dave Flemming (play-by-play), Brock Osweiler (analyst), and Dawn Davenport (sideline)

The 2025 Las Vegas Bowl was a college football bowl game played on December 31, 2025, at Allegiant Stadium located in Paradise, Nevada. The 33rd annual Las Vegas Bowl game began at approximately 12:30 p.m. PST and aired on ESPN. The Las Vegas Bowl was one of the 2025–26 bowl games concluding the 2025 FBS football season. The game was sponsored by roofing materials distribution company SRS Distribution and officially known as the SRS Distribution Las Vegas Bowl.

The Utah Utes from the Big 12 Conference defeated the Nebraska Cornhuskers from the Big Ten Conference, 44–22.

== Teams ==
Consistent with conference tie-ins, the bowl featured a team from the Big Ten Conference, Nebraska, and a former member of the Pac-12 Conference, Utah (who left the Pac-12 for the Big 12 Conference following the 2023 season). Utah became the first Big 12 member to play in a Las Vegas Bowl.

This was the fifth meeting between Nebraska and Utah; Nebraska won the previous four meetings.

=== Nebraska Cornhuskers ===
Nebraska won five of their first six games, losing only to #21 Michigan, and were briefly ranked in mid-October. The Cornhuskers lost four of their final six regular-season games and entered the Las Vegas Bowl with a 7–5 record.

=== Utah Utes ===
Utah compiled a 10–2 regular-season record, losing only to two ranked opponents, Texas Tech and BYU. The Utes played one other ranked team, Arizona State, whom they defeated by a 42–10 score. Utah entered the Las Vegas Bowl ranked 15th in each of the major polls.

== Game summary ==
2025 SRS Distribution Las Vegas Bowl

Quarter	1	2	3	4	Total
Nebraska	14	0	0	8	22
No. 15 Utah	7	17	14	6	44

at Allegiant Stadium • Paradise, Nevada

- Date: Wednesday, December 31, 2025
- Game time: 12:30 p.m. PST
- Game weather: Sunny • Temperature: 52 °F (11 °C)
- Game attendance: 38,879
- Referee: Jason Autrey
- TV announcers (ESPN): Dave Flemming (play-by-play), Brock Osweiler (analyst), and Dawn Davenport (sideline)
- Box score

Game information

First Quarter

- (11:08) NEB – Mekhi Nelson 38-yard run, Kyle Cunanan kick (Drive: 8 plays, 82 yards, 3:47, Nebraska 7–0)
- (8:33) UTAH – Devon Dampier 2-yard run, Dillon Curtis kick (Drive: 6 plays, 75 yards, 2:35, 7-7)
- (2:20) NEB – Jacory Barney Jr. 8-yard pass from TJ Lateef, Kyle Cunanan kick (Drive: 12 plays, 75 yards, 6:13, Nebraska 14-7)

Second Quarter

- (10:05) UTAH – JJ Buchanan 20-yard pass from Devon Dampier, Dillon Curtis kick (Drive: 9 plays, 74 yards, 3:23, 14-14)
- (4:13) UTAH – Dillon Curtis 28-yard field goal (Drive: 10 plays, 50 yards, 4:07, Utah 17-14)
- (0:20) UTAH – Devon Dampier 11-yard run, Dillon Curtis kick (Drive: 10 plays, 74 yards, 1:52, 24-14)

Third Quarter

- (10:40) UTAH – NaQuari Rogers 3-yard run, Dillon Curtis kick (Drive: 10 plays, 75 yards, 4:20, 31-14)
- (5:56) UTAH – Devon Dampier 5-yard run, Dillon Curtis kick (Drive: 9 plays, 51 yards, 3:03, 38-14)

Fourth Quarter

- (8:16) UTAH – Dallen Bentley 17-yard pass from Devon Dampier, Dillon Curtis kick missed (Drive: 8 plays, 95 yards, 2:36, 44-14)
- (1:55) NEB – TJ Lateef 7-yard run, Quinn Clark PAT pass from TJ Lateef (Drive: 13 plays, 75 yards, 6:21, 44-22)

=== Statistics ===
Statistics	NEB	UTAH
First downs	17	26
Plays–yards	65–343	76–535
Rushes–yards	37–161	45–225
Passing yards	182	310
Passing: comp–att–int	15–28–1	19–31–0
Time of possession	31:39	28:21

Team	Category	Player	Statistics
Nebraska	Passing	TJ Lateef	15/28, 182 yards, TD, INT
Nebraska	Rushing	Mekhi Nelson	12 carries, 88 yards, TD
Nebraska	Receiving	Isaiah Mozee	6 receptions, 48 yards
Utah	Passing	Devon Dampier	19/31, 310 yards, 2 TD
Utah	Rushing	Devon Dampier	19 carries, 148 yards, 3 TD
Utah	Receiving	Dallen Bentley	8 receptions, 28 yards, TD
