= Glenn Thomas =

Glen(n) Thomas may refer to:

- Glenn Thomas (American football) (born 1977), coach
- Glen Thomas (born 1967), English footballer
- Doe B (Glenn Thomas, 1991–2013), American rapper
- 'Truth Thomas', Glenn Thomas, singer-songwriter and poet

== See also ==
- Thomas Glenn (disambiguation)
