= Thomas Glenn =

Thomas Glenn may refer to:

- Thomas G. Glenn, Canadian opera singer
- Thomas L. Glenn (1847–1918), American politician
- Thomas Glenn (pioneer), pioneer in the Western Virginia and Kentucky territories

== See also ==
- Thomas Glen (1796–1887), Scottish-Canadian politician and merchant
- John Thomas Glenn (1845–1899), mayor of Atlanta
- Thomas Glen-Coats (disambiguation)
- Glenn Thomas (disambiguation)
