= Thomas Glen-Coats =

Thomas Glen-Coats may refer to:

- Sir Thomas Glen-Coats, 1st Baronet (1846–1922), Scottish thread-maker and politician
- Sir Thomas Glen-Coats, 2nd Baronet (1878–1954), Olympic gold medalist, son of the above

== See also ==
- Thomas Coats (disambiguation)
- Thomas Coates (disambiguation)
- Thomas Glenn (disambiguation)
