= Thomas Coates =

Thomas Coates may refer to:

- Tommy Coates (1909–1980), stock car driver
- Thomas Coates (musician) (1803–1895), the "Father of Band Music in America"
- Thomas J. Coates (born 1945), director of the UCLA Center for World Health
- Thomas Coates (artist) (1941–2023), British artist

== See also ==
- Thomas Coats (disambiguation)
- Thomas Cotes (died 1641), English printer
- Thomas Glen-Coats (disambiguation)
