= Thomas Coats (disambiguation) =

Thomas Coats (1809–1883), was a Scottish thread manufacturer.

Thomas Coats may also refer to:

- Tommy Coats, actor in The Vigilantes Are Coming
- Thomas Coats, 2nd Baron Glentanar, heir of George Coats, 1st Baron Glentanar

== See also ==
- Thomas Cotes (Royal Navy officer) (1712–1767), British admiral
- Thomas Cotes (died 1641), London printer
- Thomas Coates (disambiguation)
- Thomas Glen-Coats (disambiguation)
