= Eleanor Roosevelt High School (California) =

Public high school in California, United States

Location
- 7447 Scholar Way; Eastvale, California 92880; United States; 33.9532°N 117.5687°W

Information
- Type: Public High School
- Motto: “Be the Best at Getting Better”
- Opened: September 5, 2006
- School district: Corona-Norco Unified School District
- NCES District ID: 0609850
- CEEB code: 054078
- NCES School ID: 060985011709
- Principal: Jennifer Montgomery
- Teaching staff: 169.51 (on an FTE basis)
- Grades: 9-12
- Enrollment: 4,353 (2024–2025)
- Student to teacher ratio: 25.68
- Colors: Navy, orange, and white
- Nickname: ERHS, Roosevelt, Roosey
- Team name: Mustangs
- Feeder schools: River Heights Intermediate School, Dr. Augustine Ramirez Intermediate School
- Website: roosevelt.cnusd.k12.ca.us

Eleanor Roosevelt High School is a high school located in Eastvale, California, United States. The school opened in 2006. It is one of five comprehensive public high schools in the Corona-Norco Unified School District and currently the only one located in Eastvale. The school hosts a wide variety of academic programs including AVID, Dual Language Immersion, Puente, and Umoja. In the 2019-2020 school year, the school received an expansion of facilities with the completion of the eSTEM building to support the STEM academic program that began in the 2016-2017 school year.

== Demographics ==
The school consists of 43.7% Hispanic, 28.8% Asian, 14.5% White, 9.3% Black, 2.9% Two or More Races, 0.4% American Indian/Alaska Native, and 0.3% Native Hawaiian/Pacific Islander.

== Athletics ==
Roosevelt is part of California Interscholastic Federation (CIF) Big VIII League. Roosevelt’s Marching Band is not a part of CIF, but is a part of the Southern California School Band and Orchestra Association (SCSBOA) 6A Division.

=== Fall sports ===
- Girls’ flag-football (JV, varsity)
- Football (freshman, JV, varsity)
- Girls' cross-country
- Boys' cross-country
- Boys' water polo (freshman, JV, varsity)
- Girls' volleyball (freshman, JV, varsity)
- Girls' tennis (JV, varsity)
- Girls' golf
- Marching Band (field, parade)

=== Winter sports ===
- Boys Basketball (freshman, JV, varsity)
- Girls Basketball (freshman, JV, varsity)
- Boys Soccer (freshman, JV, varsity)
- Girls Soccer (freshman, JV, varsity)
- Girls Water Polo (freshman, JV, varsity)
- Boys Wrestling (freshman, JV, varsity)
- Girls Wrestling (freshman, JV, varsity)
- Winter Guard (JV, varsity)
- Winter Percussion (JV, varsity)
- Boys Swimming (freshman, JV, varsity)

=== Spring sports ===
- Baseball (freshman, JV, varsity)
- Softball (freshman, JV, varsity)
- Boys Volleyball (JV, varsity)
- Boys Golf (JV, varsity)
- Boys Lacrosse (JV, varsity)
- Girls Lacrosse (JV, varsity)
- Girls Track and Field (JV, varsity)
- Boys Track and Field (JV, varsity)
- Boys Swimming (JV, varsity)
- Girls Swimming (JV, varsity)
- Boys Tennis (JV, varsity)

== Controversies ==
Eleanor Roosevelt High School has had multiple teachers and students arrested on charges relating to sexual assault or inappropriate contact with students.

In September 2013, 2 teenage boys were arrested at Eleanor Roosevelt High School for connections to a sexual assault case, where witnesses stated that they were raping a freshman girl. One of the students arrested was allegedly recently expelled for an unrelated issue and is now attending another high school in Corona.

In October 2019, Joe Robles Jr., a science teacher and Cross Country Coach, was arrested for suspicion of having sexual relationships with multiple students. He was charged with multiple counts of sexual assaults against former students, including rape of a minor under 14. He was later convicted of the charges and is currently serving a four-year prison sentence at California State Prison at Lancaster as of 2022.

In April 2022, Amanda Quinonez, an English Language Arts teacher and Water Polo coach, was arrested for suspicion of sending explicit photographs to a student of hers. She was soon placed on unpaid leave after the arrest. Principal Greg Anderson said the Corona-Norco Unified School District has “zero tolerance for any behavior that endangers our students.”

In November 2023, Chad Costello, the theatre director, was arrested for inappropriate contact with students, and later was charged with child sexual battery. The investigations began in April 2023 as soon as principal Greg Anderson was informed of the allegations. Costello was subsequently placed on administrative leave during the investigation, he has since been released by the district.

In February 2024, Dr. Greg Anderson, the principal of Eleanor Roosevelt High School, was arrested in connection to the case of Costello's inappropriate contact. Anderson was arrested due to allegedly failing to report possible child harassment and assault. While it was later determined he reported the incident immediately to the authorities, mandatory reporter laws in California may have been violated due to failure of appropriate reporting documentations.

== Notable alumni ==
- Tyler Slavin (2010) – NFL wide receiver
- Marcus Williams (2014) – safety for the Baltimore Ravens
- Chris Wilcox (2016) – cornerback for the Indianapolis Colts
- Matt Mitchell (2017) – professional basketball player for SIG Strasbourg of the French LNB Pro A
- Erik Brooks (2018) – wide receiver for the Calgary Stampeders
- Ugonne Oniyah (2020) - professional basketball player for the Indiana Fever
- Chris Johnson (2022) – cornerback for the Miami Dolphins
- Andrew Marshall (2023) – college football cornerback for the Nebraska Cornhuskers
- Brayden Burries (2025) – basketball player for the Milwaukee Bucks
