= Ainsworth High School =

Coordinates: 42.5475°N 99.8565°W

Location
- 520 E 2nd Street; Ainsworth, Nebraska 69210; United States

Information
- Type: Public school
- School district: Ainsworth Community Schools
- Teaching staff: 16.50 (FTE)
- Grades: 9th - 12th
- Enrollment: 119 (2022–23)
- Student to teacher ratio: 7.21
- Colors: Red and white
- Mascot: Bulldogs
- Conference: Southwest Conference

Ainsworth High School is a secondary school located in Ainsworth, Nebraska, United States, and is part of Ainsworth Community Schools.

== About ==
The Ainsworth School was originally built in 1922. In 1949, what is now the Ag Shop was added. In 1954 the Lila McAndrew Elementary and gymnasium were added. In 1965, an Annex Building was moved onto the grounds and is now the Superintendent's Office. The Learning Center was added in 1975. In 2000, the new cafeteria, loft and renovations were completed with the passing of a bond in 1998. In the summer of 2018, the old Ag Shop was torn down and replaced by a much larger and more adequate facility. This new facility opened to students in January 2019.

Ainsworth takes in students from Ainsworth Middle School and McAndrew Elementary School.

The high school offers membership in various clubs, such as FBLA, FFA, FCCLA, Speech, Thespians, Mock Trial, Choir, Band, A-Club, Student Council, Yearbook, Cheerleaders, Pom Squad, Art Club, Bulldog Beat, DI, Drama and Spanish Club.

== Athletics ==
The Bulldogs are members of the Southwest Conference, and they wear the colors of red and white. Ainsworth offers competition in cross country, football, basketball, volleyball, track & field, golf and wrestling.

== Notable alumni ==
- Carter Nelson (2024), college football wide receiver for the Nebraska Cornhuskers
