= Dasan McCullough =

American football player (born 2003)

Profile
- Position: Outside linebacker

Personal information
- Born: March 7, 2003 (age 23); Bloomington, Indiana, U.S.
- Listed height: 6 ft 5 in (1.96 m)
- Listed weight: 240 lb (109 kg)

Career information
- High school: Bloomington South
- College: Indiana (2022); Oklahoma (2023–2024); Nebraska (2025)
- NFL draft: 2026: undrafted

Career history
- Denver Broncos (2026)*
- * Offseason or practice squad member only
- Stats at ESPN

Dasan McCullough (born March 7, 2003) is an American professional football outside linebacker. He played college football for the Indiana Hoosiers, Oklahoma Sooners, and Nebraska Cornhuskers. McCullough was signed by the Denver Broncos as an undrafted free agent in 2026.

== Early life ==
McCullough initially attended Blue Valley North High School in Overland Park, Kansas while his father was the running backs coach for the Kansas City Chiefs. He moved to Bloomington, Indiana before the start of his senior year after his father was hired to coach at Indiana University and transferred to Bloomington High School South. McCullough was named first team All-State after recording 55 tackles, three sacks, six for loss, and two interceptions. He was rated a four-star recruit and initially committed to play college football at Ohio State entering his junior year of high school. At the end of the year, McCullough decommitted and flipped his commitment to Indiana. His commitment made him the highest-rated recruit in Indiana's history.

== College career ==
=== Indiana ===
McCullough joined the Indiana Hoosiers as an early enrollee in January 2022. He was named honorable mention All-Big Ten Conference as a true freshman after recording 49 tackles, 6.5 tackles for loss, four sacks, and three passes broken up. McCullough entered the NCAA transfer portal following the end of his freshman season.

=== Oklahoma ===
McCullough committed to transfer to Oklahoma.

On December 10, 2024, McCullough announced that he would enter the transfer portal for the second time.

=== Nebraska ===
On December 22, 2024, McCullough announced that he would transfer to Nebraska.

== Professional career ==
Pre-draft measurables
Height	Weight	Arm length	Hand span	Wingspan	40-yard dash	10-yard split	20-yard split	20-yard shuttle	Three-cone drill	Vertical jump	Broad jump
6 ft 5 3/8 in (1.97 m)	240 lb (109 kg)	33 7/8 in (0.86 m)	9 3/8 in (0.24 m)	6 ft 9 1/8 in (2.06 m)	4.59 s	1.64 s	2.65 s	4.52 s	7.00 s	36.0 in (0.91 m)	10 ft 3 in (3.12 m)
All values from Pro Day

After going undrafted in the 2026 NFL draft, McCullough signed with the Denver Broncos as an undrafted free agent. On August 30, 2026, he was waived by the Broncos during final roster cuts.

== Personal life ==
McCullough's father, Deland McCullough, played running back in the National Football League and the Canadian Football League before entering coaching. His grandfather, Sherman Smith, is also a former NFL running back and coach. McCullough's older brother, Deland II, played football at Indiana while his younger brother, Daeh, plays at Cincinnati.
