= Rocco Spindler =

American football player (born 2002)

No. 50
- Position: Guard

Personal information
- Born: June 25, 2002 (age 24)
- Listed height: 6 ft 5 in (1.96 m)
- Listed weight: 316 lb (143 kg)

Career information
- High school: Clarkston (Clarkston, Michigan)
- College: Notre Dame (2021–2024); Nebraska (2025)
- NFL draft: 2026: undrafted
- Stats at ESPN

Rocco Seth Kodiak Spindler (born June 25, 2002) is an American football guard. He played college football for the Notre Dame Fighting Irish and Nebraska Cornhuskers.

== Early life ==
Spindler attended Clarkston High School in Clarkston, Michigan. Coming out of high school, he was rated as a four-star recruit, 2nd overall recruit in the state of Michigan, and the 44th overall player in the class of 2021 by 247Sports, receiving offers from schools such as Michigan, Ohio State, LSU, Notre Dame, and Penn State. Ultimately, Spindler committed to play college football for the Notre Dame Fighting Irish.

== College career ==
=== Notre Dame ===
In four years with the Fighting Irish from 2021 to 2024, Spindler made 23 career starts at offensive guard, including in the 2025 College Football Playoff National Championship. After the conclusion of the 2024 season, he entered the NCAA transfer portal.

=== Nebraska ===
Spindler transferred to play for the Nebraska Cornhuskers, and started in 12 regular season games at right guard in 2025. After the conclusion of the season, he declared for the 2026 NFL draft.

== Professional career ==
Pre-draft measurables
Height	Weight	Arm length	Hand span	Wingspan	20-yard shuttle	Three-cone drill	Bench press
6 ft 4 5/8 in (1.95 m)	316 lb (143 kg)	31 1/4 in (0.79 m)	9 3/8 in (0.24 m)	6 ft 6 in (1.98 m)	4.95 s	7.87 s	18 reps
All values from Pro Day

In May 2026, he attended rookie minicamp with the New York Jets.

== Personal life ==
He is the son of former NFL defensive lineman Marc Spindler.
