= Nyziah Hunter =

American football player (born 2004)

No. 13 – Nebraska Cornhuskers
- Position: Wide receiver
- Class: (redshirt) Junior

Personal information
- Born: December 6, 2004 (age 21)
- Listed height: 6 ft 1 in (1.85 m)
- Listed weight: 210 lb (95 kg)

Career information
- High school: Salinas (Salinas, California)
- College: California (2023–2024); Nebraska (2025–present)
- Stats at ESPN

Nyziah Hunter (born December 6, 2004) is an American college football wide receiver for the Nebraska Cornhuskers. He previously played for the California Golden Bears.

== Early life ==
Hunter attended Salinas High School in Salinas, California. As a senior, he recorded 52 receptions for 912 yards and 14 touchdowns. A four-star recruit, he committed to play college football at the University of California, Berkeley.

== College career ==
=== California ===
After redshirting in 2023, Hunter emerged as one of California's leading receivers in 2024. In his collegiate debut against UC Davis, he caught four passes for 47 yards and a touchdown. Hunter finished the season, hauling in 40 receptions for a team-high 578 yards and five touchdowns. On December 10, 2024, he entered the transfer portal.

=== Nebraska ===
On December 19, 2024, Hunter announced his decision to transfer to the University of Nebraska–Lincoln to play for the Nebraska Cornhuskers.

=== Statistics ===
Season	Team	GP	Receiving			
Season	Team	GP	Rec	Yds	Avg	TD
2023	California	Redshirt (redshirt)				
2024	California	12	40	578	14.5	5
2025	Nebraska	10	41	592	14.4	5
Career		22	81	1,170	14.4	10
