= Rob Aurich =

American football coach

Current position
- Title: Defensive coordinator
- Team: Nebraska
- Conference: Big Ten

Biographical details
- Born: Spring Lake, Michigan, U.S.

Playing career
- 2006–2010: Minnesota Duluth
- Position: Linebacker

Coaching career (HC unless noted)
- 2014–2016: Bemidji State (ST/LB)
- 2017: Bemidji State (DC/LB)
- 2018–2021: South Dakota (STC/ILB)
- 2022–2023: Idaho (DC/LB)
- 2024: San Diego State (DE)
- 2025: San Diego State (DC/LB)
- 2026–present: Nebraska (DC)

Rob Aurich is an American football coach who is currently the defensive coordinator for the Nebraska Cornhuskers.

== Playing career ==
Aurich played college football at Minnesota Duluth as a linebacker, where he finished his career as the program’s second all-time leading tackler with 310 stops and helped the Bulldogs win two Division II National Championships.

== Coaching career ==
In 2014, he got his first coaching job as the linebackers coach at Bemidji State, where he was promoted to be the team's defensive coordinator in 2017. In 2018, Aurich joined South Dakota as the team's linebackers coach and special teams coordinator. Before the start of the 2022 season, he was hired as the defensive coordinator at Idaho. Ahead of the 2024 season, Aurich was hired as the defensive line coach at San Diego State. Heading into the 2025 season, he was promoted to serve as San Diego State's defensive coordinator. On December 7, 2025, Aurich was hired to be the defensive coordinator for the Nebraska Cornhuskers after one season at San Diego State.
