= TJ Lateef =

American football player

No. 14 – Nebraska Cornhuskers
- Position: Quarterback
- Class: Sophomore

Personal information
- Listed height: 6 ft 1 in (1.85 m)
- Listed weight: 200 lb (91 kg)

Career information
- High school: Orange Lutheran (Orange, California)
- College: Nebraska (2025–present)
- Stats at ESPN

TJ Lateef is an American college football quarterback for the Nebraska Cornhuskers.

== Early life ==
Lateef attended Lutheran High School of Orange County in Orange, California. During his career he had 6,500 total yards and 66 touchdowns. He committed to the University of Nebraska–Lincoln to play college football.

== College career ==
Lateef entered his true freshman year at Nebraska in 2025 as the backup to Dylan Raiola. He took over after Raiola was injured against the USC Trojans, becoming the presumptive starter for the remainder of the season. In his first start in the following game against UCLA, he threw for 205 yards and three touchdowns in a 28–21 victory.

=== College statistics ===
Season	Team	Games			Passing								Rushing			
Season	Team	GP	GS	Record	Cmp	Att	Pct	Yds	Avg	TD	Int	Rtg	Att	Yds	Avg	TD
2025	Nebraska	6	3	1–2	59	95	62.1	722	7.6	4	0	139.8	27	98	3.6	3
2026	Nebraska	0	0	0–0	0	0	0.0	0	0.0	0	0	0.0	0	0	0.0	0
Career		6	3	1–2	59	95	62.1	722	7.6	4	0	139.8	27	98	3.6	3
