= Jalyn Gramstad =

American football quarterback

Current position
- Title: Graduate assistant
- Team: Nebraska Cornhuskers
- Conference: Big Ten

Playing career
- 2020–2023: Northwestern (IA)
- 2024–2025: Nebraska
- Position: Quarterback

Coaching career (HC unless noted)
- 2026–present: Nebraska (GA)

Accomplishments and honors

Awards
- As a player: NAIA national champion (2022); NAIA Player of the Year (2023); GPAC Player of the Year (2023); First-team All-GPAC (2023); Second-team All-GPAC (2022)

Jalyn Gramstad is an American college football coach who is a graduate assistant for the Nebraska Cornhuskers. He previously played for Nebraska and Northwestern College in Orange City, Iowa.

== Early life ==
Gramstad grew up in Lester, Iowa and attended West Lyon High School, where he played basketball, baseball, football, and golf. As a senior, he passed for 19 touchdowns and rushed for 11 touchdowns as West Lyon won the Class 1A state championship.

== College career ==
Gramstad began his college football career at Northwestern College of the NAIA. He played defensive back for his first two seasons. Gramstad moved quarterback before the 2022 season and passed for 2,511 yards and 25 touchdowns and also rushed for 1,024 yards and 23 touchdowns. He was named the NAIA Football Player of the Year Award as a senior after passing for 3,681 yards and 35 touchdowns while also rushing for 772 yards and eight touchdowns.

Gramstad transferred to Nebraska after utilizing the extra year of eligibility granted to college athletes who played in the 2020 season due to the COVID-19 pandemic. He stated his reason for transferring intent to pursue a career in coaching. Gramstad appeared in one game for the Cornhuskers, completing one of three pass attempts for 11 yards and rushing once for two yards while preserving a redshirt on the season. He decided to return for an additional season.

== Coaching career ==
Gramstad began his coaching career as a graduate assistant at Nebraska in 2026 after the end of his playing career with the Cornhuskers.
