= DeShon Singleton =

American football player (born 2003)

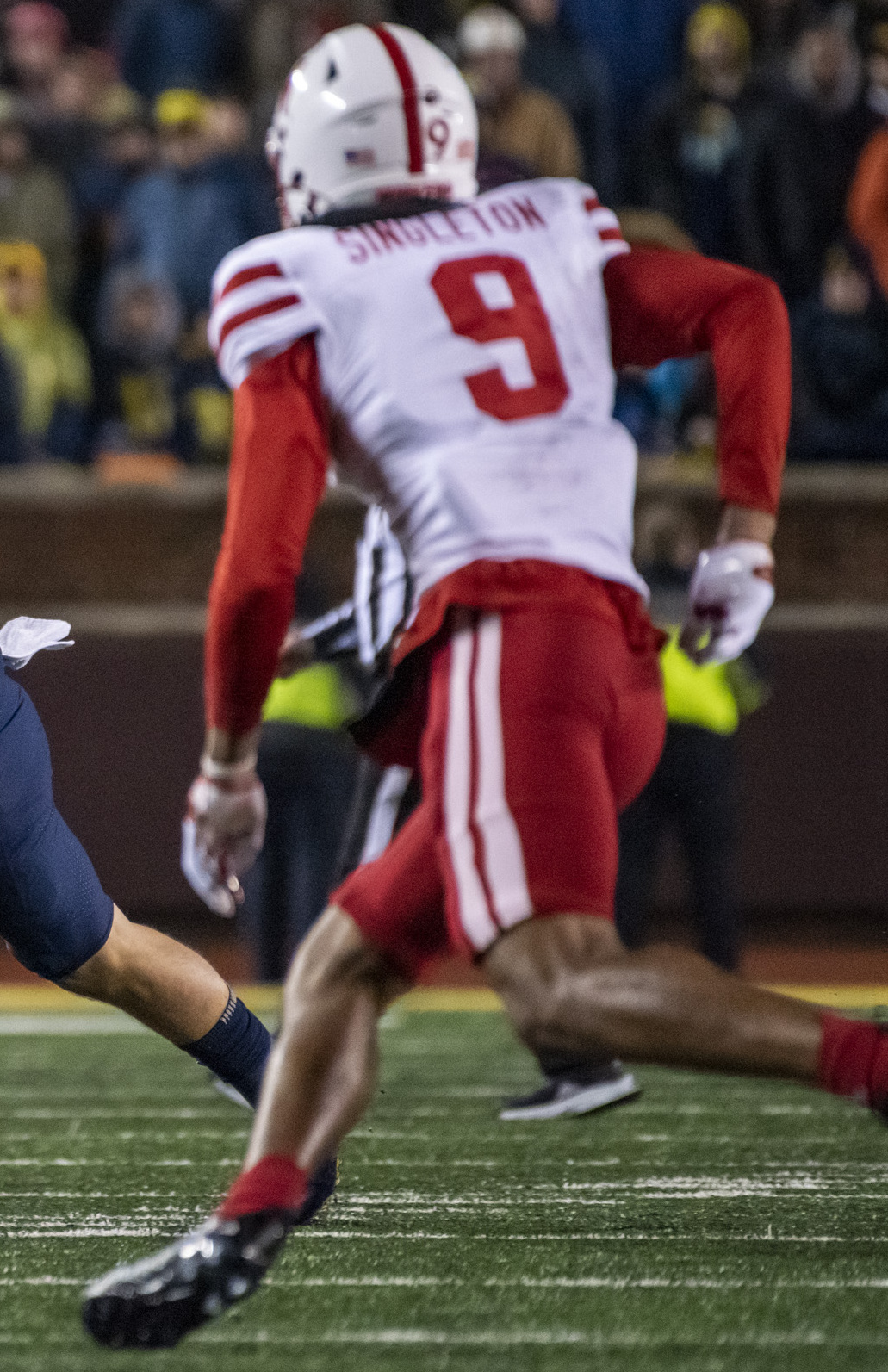

No. 25 – Kansas City Chiefs
- Position: Safety
- Roster status: Practice squad

Personal information
- Born: February 4, 2003 (age 23); Greensburg, Louisiana, U.S.
- Listed height: 6 ft 3 in (1.91 m)
- Listed weight: 210 lb (95 kg)

Career information
- High school: St. Helena (Greensburg, Louisiana)
- College: Hutchinson CC (2021); Nebraska (2022–2025)
- NFL draft: 2026: undrafted

Career history
- Kansas City Chiefs (2026–present)*
- * Offseason or practice squad member only
- Stats at Pro Football Reference

DeShon Singleton (born February 4, 2003) is an American professional football safety for the Kansas City Chiefs of the National Football League (NFL). He played college football for the Hutchinson Blue Dragons and Nebraska Cornhuskers.

== Early life ==
Singleton attended St. Helena High School. Coming out of high school, he committed to play college football at Hutchinson Community College.

== College career ==
=== Hutchinson CC ===
Singleton spent one season at Hutchinson Community College in 2021, before entering the transfer portal.

=== Nebraska ===
Singleton transferred to play for the Nebraska Cornhuskers. In his first season as a Cornhusker in 2022, he recorded just three tackles. During the 2023 season, Singleton played in just five games due to a season ending knee injury suffered versus Michigan, where he totaled 19 tackles with two and a half being for a loss, and a pass deflection. In week 8 of the 2024 season, he recorded ten tackles against Ohio State. He finished the 2024 season, playing in 13 games, where he totaled 71 tackles, three pass deflections, and an interception. In the 2025 season opener, Singleton tallied seven tackles in a win over Cincinnati. In week 5, he recorded six tackles and two interceptions, earning Big Ten Defensive Player of the Week and East-West Shrine Bowl defensive player of the week honors.

== Professional career ==
Pre-draft measurables
Height	Weight	Arm length	Hand span	Wingspan	40-yard dash	10-yard split	20-yard split	20-yard shuttle	Three-cone drill	Vertical jump	Broad jump	Bench press
6 ft 3 in (1.91 m)	205 lb (93 kg)	32 7/8 in (0.84 m)	10 in (0.25 m)	6 ft 8 1/4 in (2.04 m)	4.58 s	1.64 s	2.62 s	4.33 s	7.06 s	39.5 in (1.00 m)	10 ft 10 in (3.30 m)	12 reps
All values from NFL Combine/Pro Day

Singleton signed with the Kansas City Chiefs as an undrafted free agent on May 1, 2026. On August 30, Singleton was waived by Kansas City as a part of final roster cuts; he was re-signed to the team's practice squad the next day.

== Personal life ==
Singleton is the older brother of Cornhuskers receiver DJ Singleton.
