= Andrew Marshall (cornerback) =

American football player (born 2005)

No. 7 – Nebraska Cornhuskers
- Position: Cornerback
- Class: Senior

Personal information
- Born: October 11, 2005 (age 21)
- Listed height: 6 ft 0 in (1.83 m)
- Listed weight: 195 lb (88 kg)

Career information
- High school: Eleanor Roosevelt (Eastvale, California)
- College: Idaho (2023–2024); Nebraska (2025–present)
- Stats at ESPN

Andrew Marshall (born October 11, 2005) is an American college football cornerback for the Nebraska Cornhuskers. He previously played for the Idaho Vandals.

== Early life ==
Marshall attended Eleanor Roosevelt High School in Eastvale, California. He played cornerback and wide receiver in high school. He committed to the University of Idaho to play college football.

== College career ==
Marshall played at Idaho in 2023 and 2024, starting 14 of 26 games and recorded 72 tackles and returned both a punt and kickoff for a touchdown. After the 2024 season, he transferred to the University of Nebraska–Lincoln. In his first season at Nebraska in 2025, Marshall started all 13 games and had 45 tackles and one interception. He returned to Nebraska as a starter his senior season in 2026.
