= Williams Nwaneri =

American football player

No. 96 – Nebraska Cornhuskers
- Position: Defensive end
- Class: (redshirt) Sophomore

Personal information
- Born: November 5, 2005 (age 21)
- Listed height: 6 ft 7 in (2.01 m)
- Listed weight: 265 lb (120 kg)

Career information
- High school: Lee's Summit North (Lee's Summit, Missouri)
- College: Missouri (2024); Nebraska (2025–present)
- Stats at ESPN

Williams Nwaneri (born November 5, 2005) is an American college football defensive end for the Nebraska Cornhuskers. He previously played for the Missouri Tigers.

== Early life ==
Nwaneri played football for Lee's Summit North High School in Kansas City, Missouri, and was rated as a five-star prospect and one of the top players in the 2024 college football recruiting class. On August 14, 2023, he committed to play college football for the Missouri Tigers. Nwaneri was picked to play in the 2024 Under Armour All-America Game.

College recruiting
Name	Hometown	School	Height	Weight	Commit date
Williams Nwaneri; DE	Lee's Summit, Missouri	Lee's Summit North	6 ft 7 in (2.01 m)	255 lb (116 kg)	Aug 14, 2023
Williams Nwaneri; DE	Recruit ratings: Rivals: 247Sports: ESPN: (90)				

== College career ==
=== Missouri ===
On December 10, 2024, after redshirting his freshman season at Missouri, Nwaneri announced that he would enter the NCAA transfer portal.

=== Nebraska ===
On December 12, it was reported that Nwaneri had chosen to transfer to Nebraska; he made his commitment official on December 13. He has four seasons of eligibility remaining.
