= Carter Nelson =

American football player (born 2005)

No. 29 – Nebraska Cornhuskers
- Position: Wide receiver
- Class: Sophomore

Personal information
- Born: July 25, 2005 (age 21)
- Listed height: 6 ft 5 in (1.96 m)
- Listed weight: 230 lb (104 kg)

Career information
- High school: Ainsworth (Ainsworth, Nebraska)
- College: Nebraska (2024–present)
- Stats at ESPN

Carter Nelson (born July 25, 2005) is an American college football wide receiver for the Nebraska Cornhuskers.

== Early life ==
Nelson grew up in Ainsworth, Nebraska and attended Ainsworth High School, where he played basketball, eight-man football, and competed in track and field. As a senior he caught 32 passes for 658 yards and 14 touchdowns while also rushing for 1,148 yards and 19 touchdowns and recording 80 tackles with three interceptions on defense. After the season Nelson played in the 2024 All-American Bowl, which was the first 11-man football game he had played in. He was also a first-team all-state selection in basketball after averaging 16.2 points, 8.2 rebounds, 5.4 assists, and 3.1 blocks per game and won the Class C state championship in long jump.

Nelson was rated a four-star recruit and one of the top tight end prospects in the 2024 recruiting class. He committed to play college football at Nebraska over offers from Georgia, Notre Dame, and Penn State.

== College career ==
Nelson was moved to wide receiver from tight end during Nebraska's preseason practices as a freshman. He made his college debut in the Cornhuskers' season opener against UTEP and caught three passes for 21 yards in a 40–7 win. Nelson scored his first career touchdown on a 24-yard reception in Nebraska's 34–3 win over Northern Iowa during Week Three. He finished the season with ten receptions for 86 yards and one touchdown.
