= Luke Lindenmeyer =

American football player (born 2003)

No. 44 – Nebraska Cornhuskers
- Position: Tight end
- Class: (redshirt) Senior

Personal information
- Born: September 2, 2003 (age 23)
- Listed height: 6 ft 3 in (1.91 m)
- Listed weight: 250 lb (113 kg)

Career information
- High school: Papillion-La Vista Senior (Papillion, Nebraska)
- College: Nebraska (2022–present)
- Stats at ESPN

Luke Lindenmeyer (born September 2, 2003) is an American football tight end for the Nebraska Cornhuskers.

== Early life ==
Lindenmeyer attended high school at Papillion-La Vista Senior located in Papillion, Nebraska. Coming out of high school, he committed to play college football for the Nebraska Cornhuskers as a walk-on.

== College career ==
During his first career season in 2022, Lindenmeyer would use the season to redshirt, before appearing in every game in 2023. During the 2024 season, he recorded five receptions for 50 yards. In week one of the 2025 season, Lindenmeyer made his first collegiate start, where he notched five catches for 47 yards against Cincinnati. In week two, Lindenmeyer hauled in three passes for 44 yards and his first career touchdown in a victory over Akron.

== Personal life ==
On September 6, 2025, Lindenmeyer proposed to his girlfriend, Nebraska scarlet dancer Kailyn Storovich on the field following a win against Akron.
