= Glenn Thomas (American football) =

American football coach (born 1977)

Nebraska Cornhuskers
- Title: Offensive coordinator & quarterbacks coach

Personal information
- Born: September 12, 1977 (age 49); Eastland, Texas, U.S.

Career information
- High school: Eastland (TX)
- College: Texas Tech

Career history
- Texas Tech (1998–2000) Student assistant; Midwestern State (2001–2003) Graduate assistant; Midwestern State (2004) Passing game coordinator & quarterbacks coach; Midwestern State (2005–2007) Offensive coordinator & quarterbacks coach; Atlanta Falcons (2008–2011) Offensive assistant; Atlanta Falcons (2012–2014) Quarterbacks coach; Temple (2015) Quarterbacks coach; Temple (2016) Offensive coordinator & quarterbacks coach; Baylor (2017–2019) Co-offensive coordinator & quarterbacks coach; UNLV (2020–2021) Offensive coordinator & quarterbacks coach; Arizona State (2022) Offensive coordinator & quarterbacks coach; Pittsburgh Steelers (2023) Offensive assistant; Nebraska (2024–2026) Co-offensive coordinator & quarterbacks coach; Nebraska (2026–present) Offensive coordinator & quarterbacks coach

Glenn Thomas (born September 12, 1977) is an American football coach who is the offensive coordinator and quarterbacks coach for the Nebraska Cornhuskers. He was previously an offensive assistant coach at the Pittsburgh Steelers.

== Personal life and education ==
A native of Eastland, Texas, Thomas attended Eastland High School before attending Texas Tech University. He graduated from Texas Tech in 1998 with a degree in Exercise and Sports Science, and earned a master's degree from Midwestern State University in education in 2004. He and his wife Felicia have two children, Hayden and Dylan.

== Coaching career ==
=== Early coaching career ===
Thomas began his coaching career at his alma mater Texas Tech as a student assistant from 1998 to 2001, before becoming a graduate assistant at Midwestern State. He worked with the wide receivers during his time as the team's graduate assistant. He served one season as the passing game coordinator and quarterbacks coach for the Mustangs before being promoted to offensive coordinator in 2005.

=== Atlanta Falcons ===
Thomas left the Mustangs to join the Atlanta Falcons on newly hired head coach Mike Smith's coaching staff. He spent 4 seasons as an offensive assistant before being promoted to the team's quarterbacks coach in 2012.

=== Return to college ===
After Falcons head coach Mike Smith was fired, Thomas was not retained by Dan Quinn. Thomas was then hired by Matt Rhule to coach quarterbacks for Temple. Marcus Satterfield, Temple's offensive coordinator shifted from coaching quarterbacks to running backs after the hire of Thomas. After Satterfield was hired to be the next head coach at Tennessee Tech, Thomas was promoted to offensive coordinator.

After Rhule was hired to be the next head coach at Baylor in 2017, Thomas joined him as the Bears' co-offensive coordinator and quarterbacks coach, sharing coordinator duties with Jeff Nixon. After Rhule left Baylor to be the head coach of the Carolina Panthers in 2020, Thomas was hired by newly hired Memphis head coach Ryan Silverfield to be a senior offensive analyst, a role he held for two months.

When UNLV's passing game coordinator and quarterbacks coach Danny Langsdorf left to accept an assistant coaching position at Colorado, Thomas was hired as the team's offensive coordinator and quarterbacks coach on April 23, 2020.

After Zak Hill resigned from Arizona State following several allegations of recruiting violations, Thomas was announced as offensive coordinator and quarterbacks coach on January 31, 2021.

On April 5, 2023, Thomas was announced as being hired as an offensive assistant for the Pittsburgh Steelers

On January 16, 2024, the Nebraska Cornhuskers hired Thomas as co-offensive coordinator and quarterbacks coach, under head coach Matt Rhule and offensive coordinator Marcus Satterfield. Dana Holgorsen replaced Satterfield as offensive coordinator toward the end of the 2024 season; Satterfield continued to coach tight ends. Nebraska fired Holgorsen on November 7, 2026, and promoted Thomas to offensive coordinator.
