= Jacory Barney Jr. =

American football player

No. 2 – Nebraska Cornhuskers
- Positions: Wide receiver, return specialist
- Class: Junior

Personal information
- Listed height: 6 ft 0 in (1.83 m)
- Listed weight: 170 lb (77 kg)

Career information
- High school: Miami Palmetto (Pinecrest, Florida)
- College: Nebraska (2024–present)

Awards and highlights
- Third-team All-Big Ten (2025)
- Stats at ESPN

Jacory Barney Jr. is an American college football wide receiver and return specialist for the Nebraska Cornhuskers.

== Early life ==
Barney grew up in Florida City, Florida and attended Miami Palmetto, where he played multiple positions on offense for the football team. As a senior, he caught 15 passes for 135 yards and one touchdown, passed for 189 yards and three touchdowns, and rushed for 100 yards and one touchdown.

Barney was rated a four-star recruit committed to play college football at Nebraska over offers from Miami and Texas A&M. Barney also held offers from Arizona and Boston College.

== College career ==
Barney joined the Nebraska Cornhuskers as an early enrollee in January 2024. He entered his freshman season as the team's primary kickoff returner. Barney was named to the Jet Award watchlist prior to the start of the season. He scored his first career touchdown on a ten yard rush in Nebraska's 34-3 win over Northern Iowa during Week Three. During the 2025 season, Barney caught a 52-yard Hail Mary pass to end the half against Michigan. The miracle pass would go viral as the season went on.
