= 2023 Nebraska Cornhuskers football team =

American college football season

2023 Nebraska Cornhuskers football
- Conference: Big Ten Conference
- West
- Record: 5–7 (3–6 Big Ten)
- Head coach: Matt Rhule (1st season)
- Offensive coordinator: Marcus Satterfield (1st season)
- Offensive scheme: Spread
- Defensive coordinator: Tony White (1st season)
- Base defense: 3–3–5
- Home stadium: Memorial Stadium

Uniform
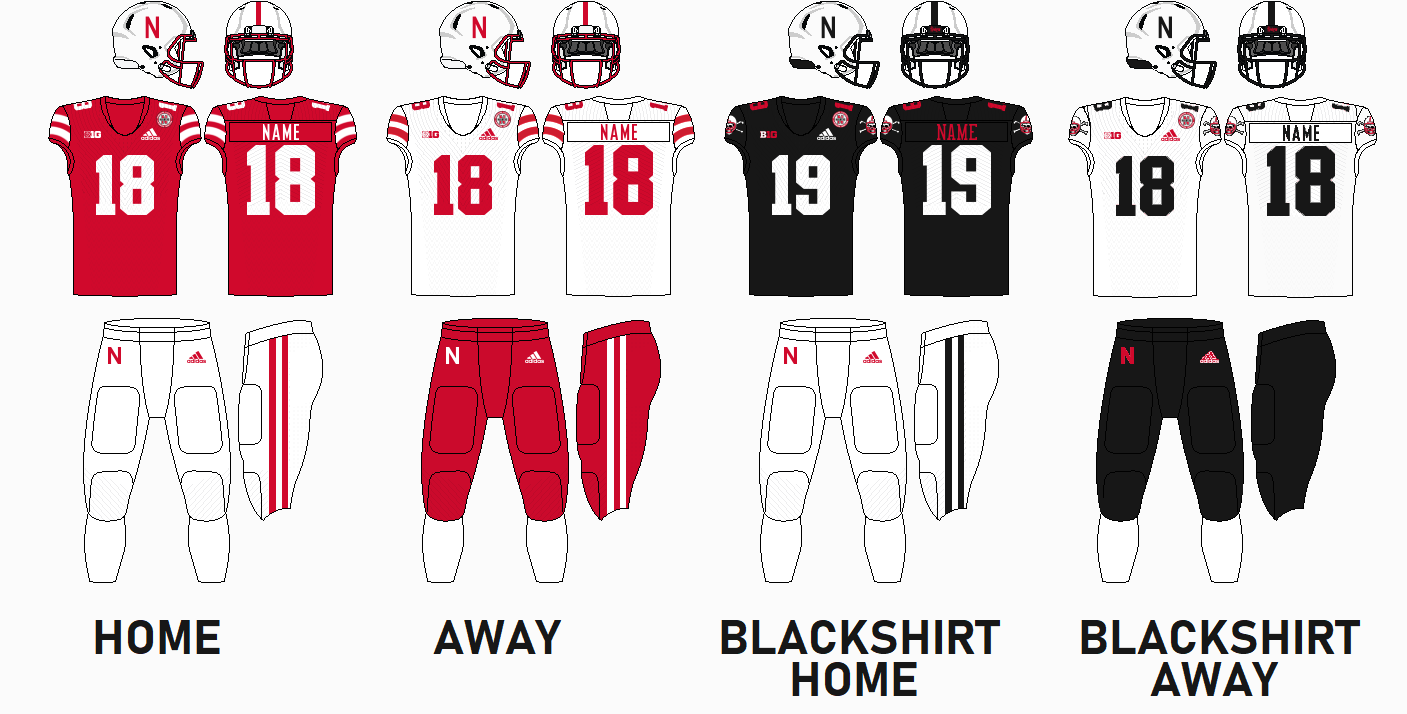

2023 Big Ten Conference football standings
	Conf.			Overall
Team	W		L	W		L
East Division
No. 1 Michigan xy$#^	9	–	0	15	–	0
No. 10 Ohio State	8	–	1	11	–	2
No. 13 Penn State	7	–	2	10	–	3
Maryland	4	–	5	8	–	5
Rutgers	3	–	6	7	–	6
Indiana	1	–	8	3	–	9
Michigan State†	0	–	7	0	–	8
West Division
No. 24 Iowa xy	7	–	2	10	–	4
Northwestern	5	–	4	8	–	5
Wisconsin	5	–	4	7	–	6
Minnesota	3	–	6	6	–	7
Illinois	3	–	6	5	–	7
Nebraska	3	–	6	5	–	7
Purdue	3	–	6	4	–	8
Championship: Michigan 26, Iowa 0
# – College Football Playoff champion; ^ – College Football Playoff participant; $ – Conference champion; x – Division champion/co-champions; y – Championship game participant; † — NCAA vacated all wins for Michigan State (4–8, 2–7); Rankings from AP Poll

The 2023 Nebraska Cornhuskers football team represented the University of Nebraska–Lincoln as a member of the West Division of the Big Ten Conference during the 2023 NCAA Division I FBS football season. Led by first-year head coach Matt Rhule, the Cornhuskers played home games at Memorial Stadium in Lincoln, Nebraska. At the conclusion of the 2023 season, Nebraska had lost 19 games by single digits over the course of the previous 3 seasons, a Division I NCAA Record.

== Offseason ==
=== Transfers ===
==== Incoming ====
Name	Position	Height	Weight	Class	Hometown	Previous
Jeff Sims	QB	6'3"	205	Junior	Jacksonville, FL	Georgia Tech
Corey Collier	CB	6'1"	170	Sophomore	Miami, FL	Florida
Marco Ortiz	LS	6'5"	236	Junior	Richmond, VA	Florida
Joshua Fleeks	WR	5'10"	190	Senior	Dallas, TX	Baylor
Chief Borders	LB	6'4"	242	Sophomore	Chicago, IL	Florida
Elijah Jeudy	DL	6'3"	295	Sophomore	Philadelphia, PA	Texas A&M
Ben Scott	OT	6'5"	290	Junior	Honolulu, HI	Arizona State
Arik Gilbert	TE	6'5"	248	(R) Sophomore	Marietta, GA	Georgia
Billy Kemp	WR	5'9"	172	Senior	Highland Springs, VA	Virginia
Jacob Hood	OT	6'8"	342	(R) Freshman	Nashville, TN	Georgia
MJ Sherman	LB	6'2"	250	Senior	Washington, D.C.	Georgia
Tyler Knaak	OT	6'7"	300	(R) Freshman	Salt Lake City, UT	Utah

==== Outgoing ====
Name	Number	Position	Height	Weight	Class	Hometown	Destination
Brant Banks	#74	OL	6'7"	300	Junior	Houston, TX	Rice
Ernest Hausmann	#15	LB	6'2"	220	Sophomore	Columbus, NE	Michigan
Decoldest Crawford	#1	WR	6'0	180	(R) Freshman	Shreveport, LA	Louisiana Tech
Kamonte Grimes	#13	WR	6'3	200	Sophomore	Naples, FL	Northern Iowa
Jaeden Gould	#18	CB	6'2	200	(R) Freshman	Somerset, NJ	Syracuse
Marquis Black	#96	DL	6'3"	300	Junior	McDonough, GA	Western Kentucky
Mosai Newsom	#52	DL	6'4"	285	Senior	Waverly, IA	South Dakota
Jaquez Yant	#0	RB	6'2"	235	Junior	Tallahassee, FL	Florida A&M
Kevin Williams	#78	OL	6'5"	325	Graduate	Omaha, NE	Charlotte
Charlie Weinrich	#24	K	5'11"	190	(R) Freshman	Stillwell, KS	Kansas
Alante Brown	#4	WR	6'0"	190	Junior	Chicago, IL	Michigan State
James Carnie	#81	TE	6'5"	220	(R) Sophomore	Firth, NE	Concordia (NE)
Evan Meyersick	#48	WR	6'5"	185	(R) Sophomore	Omaha, NE	N/A
Richard Torres	#15	QB	6'5"	210	Sophomore	San Antonio, TX	Incarnate Word
Victor Jones Jr.	#88	WR	6'2"	184	Sophomore	Orlando, FL	Liberty
Stephon Wynn Jr.	#90	DL	6'4"	299	Senior	Anderson, SC	Ole Miss
Shawn Hardy II	#80	WR	6'3"	190	(R) Sophomore	Kingsland, GA	Tennessee–Martin
Logan Smothers	#8	QB	6'2"	190	Junior	Muscle Shoals, AL	Jacksonville State
Braxton Clark	#11	CB	6'3"	180	Senior	Orlando, FL	South Florida
Casey Thompson	#11	QB	6'1"	194	Graduate	Oklahoma City, OK	Florida Atlantic
Noa Pola-Gates	#21	S	5'11"	165	Junior	Gilbert, AZ	New Mexico
Jalil Martin	#17	S	6'3"	190	Sophomore	Chicago, IL	Syracuse
Ajay Allen	#9	RB	5'11"	182	Sophomore	Monroe, LA	Miami (FL)

==== Scholarship recruits ====
College recruiting (2023)
Name	Hometown	School	Height	Weight	Commit date
Princewill Umanmielen; DE	Manor, TX	Manor	6 ft 4 in (1.93 m)	225 lb (102 kg)	Dec 19, 2022
Princewill Umanmielen; DE	Recruit ratings: Rivals: 247Sports: ESPN: (81)				
Malachi Coleman; ATH	Lincoln, NE	Lincoln East	6 ft 5 in (1.96 m)	205 lb (93 kg)	Dec 21, 2022
Malachi Coleman; ATH	Recruit ratings: Rivals: 247Sports: ESPN: (83)				
Riley Van Poppel; DL	Argyle, TX	Argyle	6 ft 4 in (1.93 m)	270 lb (120 kg)	Jun 13, 2022
Riley Van Poppel; DL	Recruit ratings: Rivals: 247Sports: ESPN: (80)				
Jaidyn Doss; WR	Peculiar, MO	Raymore–Peculiar	6 ft 0 in (1.83 m)	195 lb (88 kg)	Jun 3, 2022
Jaidyn Doss; WR	Recruit ratings: Rivals: 247Sports: ESPN: (77)				
Gunnar Gottula; OT	Lincoln, NE	Lincoln Southeast	6 ft 6 in (1.98 m)	285 lb (129 kg)	Jun 26, 2021
Gunnar Gottula; OT	Recruit ratings: Rivals: 247Sports: ESPN: (78)				
Brice Turner; ATH	Omaha, NE	Omaha Westside	6 ft 2 in (1.88 m)	195 lb (88 kg)	Dec 6, 2022
Brice Turner; ATH	Recruit ratings: Rivals: 247Sports: ESPN: (77)				
Brock Knutson; OT	Scottsbluff, NE	Scottsbluff	6 ft 7 in (2.01 m)	270 lb (120 kg)	Jun 6, 2022
Brock Knutson; OT	Recruit ratings: Rivals: 247Sports: ESPN: (76)				
Dylan Rogers; DE	Cypress, TX	Cy Woods	6 ft 2 in (1.88 m)	235 lb (107 kg)	Jul 5, 2022
Dylan Rogers; DE	Recruit ratings: Rivals: 247Sports: ESPN: (74)				
Sam Sledge; IOL	Omaha, NE	Creighton Prep	6 ft 4 in (1.93 m)	270 lb (120 kg)	Feb 20, 2022
Sam Sledge; IOL	Recruit ratings: Rivals: 247Sports: ESPN: (78)				
Dwight Bootle II; CB	Miami, FL	Miami Palmetto	6 ft 10 in (2.08 m)	165 lb (75 kg)	Jan 31, 2022
Dwight Bootle II; CB	Recruit ratings: Rivals: 247Sports: ESPN: (76)				
Eric Fields; LB	Ardmore, OK	Ardmore	6 ft 1 in (1.85 m)	195 lb (88 kg)	Dec 21, 2022
Eric Fields; LB	Recruit ratings: Rivals: 247Sports: ESPN: (N/A)				
Jaylen Lloyd; ATH	Omaha, NE	Omaha Westside	5 ft 10 in (1.78 m)	160 lb (73 kg)	Dec 17, 2022
Jaylen Lloyd; ATH	Recruit ratings: Rivals: 247Sports: ESPN: (77)				
Kai Wallin; DE	Sacramento, CA	American River C.C.	6 ft 6 in (1.98 m)	240 lb (110 kg)	Dec 12, 2022
Kai Wallin; DE	Recruit ratings: Rivals: 247Sports: ESPN: (N/A)				
Mason Goldman; OT	Gretna, NE	Gretna	6 ft 6 in (1.98 m)	260 lb (120 kg)	Dec 19, 2022
Mason Goldman; OT	Recruit ratings: Rivals: 247Sports: ESPN: (N/A)				
Syncere Safeeullah; CB	Brademton, FL	IMG Academy	6 ft 1 in (1.85 m)	170 lb (77 kg)	Dec 12, 2022
Syncere Safeeullah; CB	Recruit ratings: Rivals: 247Sports: ESPN: (75)				
Kwinten Ives; RB	Palmyra, New Jersey	Palmyra	6 ft 2 in (1.88 m)	185 lb (84 kg)	Dec 11, 2022
Kwinten Ives; RB	Recruit ratings: Rivals: 247Sports: ESPN: (78)				
Tristan Alvano; K	Omaha, NE	Omaha Westside	6 ft 2 in (1.88 m)	185 lb (84 kg)	Dec 16, 2022
Tristan Alvano; K	Recruit ratings: Rivals: 247Sports: ESPN: (N/A)				
Jason Maciejzak; DL	Pierre, SD	T.F Riggs	6 ft 4 in (1.93 m)	320 lb (150 kg)	Dec 19, 2022
Jason Maciejzak; DL	Recruit ratings: Rivals: 247Sports: ESPN: (N/A)				
Maverick Noonan; DE	Omaha, NE	Elkhorn South	6 ft 4 in (1.93 m)	225 lb (102 kg)	Jun 24, 2022
Maverick Noonan; DE	Recruit ratings: Rivals: 247Sports: ESPN: (77)				
Rahmir Stewart; S	Philadelphia, PA	Imhotep Institute	5 ft 11 in (1.80 m)	195 lb (88 kg)	Dec 17, 2022
Rahmir Stewart; S	Recruit ratings: Rivals: 247Sports: ESPN: (N/A)				
Overall recruit ranking:
Note: In many cases, Scout, Rivals, 247Sports, On3, and ESPN may conflict in their listings of height and weight.; In these cases, the average was taken. ESPN grades are on a 100-point scale.; Sources: "2021 Team Ranking". Rivals.com.

== Schedule ==
Date	Time	Opponent	Site	TV	Result	Attendance	Source
August 31	7:00 p.m.	at Minnesota	Huntington Bank Stadium; Minneapolis, MN (rivalry)	FOX	L 10–13	53,629	
September 9	11:00 a.m.	at No. 22 Colorado*	Folsom Field; Boulder, CO (rivalry, Big Noon Kickoff)	FOX	L 14–36	53,241	
September 16	6:00 p.m.	Northern Illinois*	Memorial Stadium; Lincoln, NE	FS1	W 35–11	86,875	
September 23	2:30 p.m.	Louisiana Tech*	Memorial Stadium; Lincoln, NE	BTN	W 28–14	87,115	
September 30	2:30 p.m.	No. 2 Michigan	Memorial Stadium; Lincoln, NE	FOX	L 7–45	87,134	
October 6	7:00 p.m.	at Illinois	Memorial Stadium; Champaign, IL	FS1	W 20–7	46,703	
October 21	2:30 p.m.	Northwestern	Memorial Stadium; Lincoln, NE	BTN	W 17–9	86,769	
October 28	2:30 p.m.	Purdue^{†}	Memorial Stadium; Lincoln, NE	FS1 (Note: First half moved to FS2 to accommodate the conclusion of Oklahoma-Kansas, which originally aired on FOX)	W 31–14	86,709	
November 4	11:00 a.m.	at Michigan State	Spartan Stadium; East Lansing, MI	FS1	L 17–20	63,134	
November 11	11:00 a.m.	Maryland	Memorial Stadium; Lincoln, NE	Peacock	L 10–13	86,830	
November 18	6:30 p.m.	at Wisconsin	Camp Randall Stadium; Madison, WI (rivalry)	NBC	L 17–24 ^{OT}	72,237	
November 24	11:00 a.m.	No. 17 Iowa	Memorial Stadium; Lincoln, NE (rivalry)	CBS	L 10–13	86,183	
*Non-conference game; ^{†}Homecoming; Rankings from AP Poll (and CFP Rankings,); All times are in Central time; Source:

== Roster ==
2023 Nebraska Cornhuskers football team roster
Players
Coaches
Offense

Pos.	#	Name	Class
WR	1	Billy Kemp	GS
QB	7	Jeff Sims	Jr
QB	10	Heinrich Haarberg	So
RB/WR	11	Joshua Fleeks	GS
QB	12	Chubba Purdy	Jr
WR	13	Marcus Washington (injured)	Sr
RB	14	Rahmir Johnson (injured)	Sr
WR	15	Malachi Coleman	Fr
FB	16	Janiran Bonner	RFr
WR	17	Ty Hahn	Jr
QB	17	Jake Woche	RFr
WR	19	Jaylen Lloyd	Fr
QB	19	Luke Longval	RFr
RB	21	Emmett Johnson	RFr
RB	22	Gabe Ervin Jr. (injured)	So
RB	23	Anthony Grant	Sr
TE	24	Thomas Fidone II	So
RB	25	Kenneth Williams	Fr
WR	26	Roman Mangini	RFr
RB	28	Kwinten Ives	Fr
RB	29	Trevon Kinchen	RFr
WR	32	Barron Miles Jr.	Jr
RB	33	Maurice Mazzccua	Jr
FB	34	Barrett Liebentritt	So
RB	35	Trevin Luben	Jr
WR	36	Taveon Thompson	So
WR	38	Wilson Cooper	Fr
WR	40	Demitrius Bell	Fr
FB	40	Trevor Ruth	RFr
WR	41	Elliott Brown	Jr
RB	42	Cole Ballard	Fr
FB	43	Landon Ternus	Fr
TE	44	Luke Lindenmeyer	RFr
FB	45	Braden Klover	Jr
TE	46	John Goodwin	Sr
TE	47	Caden Becker	RFr
TE	48	Cayden Echternach	Fr
OL	51	Justin Evans-Jenkins	RFr
OL	53	Conor Connealy	Fr
OL	54	Bryce Benhart	Sr
OL	57	Ethan Piper (injured)	Sr
OL	58	Mason Goldman	Fr
OL	59	Henry Lutovsky	So
OL	61	Dylan Parrott	RFr
OL	62	Sam Sledge	Fr
OL	63	Nouredin Nouili	Sr
OL	65	Teddy Prochazka	So
OL	66	Ben Scott	Sr
OL	67	Joey Mancino	So
OL	69	Turner Corcoran (injured)	Jr
OL	70	Keegan Menning	Jr
OL	71	Jacob Hood	RFr
OL	73	David Borhers	Fr
OL	74	Brock Knutson	Fr
OL	75	Tyler Knaak	RFr
OL	77	Gunnar Gottula	Fr
OL	78	Jacob Brandl	Fr
OL	79	Grant Seagren	Fr
TE	81	Ismael Smith-Flores	Fr
WR	82	Isaiah Garcia-Castaneda (injured)	Jr
TE	83	Jake Appleget	RFr
WR	84	Alex Bullock	So
WR	85	Jaidyn Doss	Fr
TE	87	Nate Boerkircher	Jr
WR	88	Cooper Hausmann	RFr

Defense

Pos.	#	Name	Class
DL	0	Nash Hutmacher	Jr
S	2	Isaac Gifford	Jr
LB	3	Nick Henrich	Sr
LB	4	Luke Reimer	Sr
LB	5	John Bullock	Sr
CB	6	Quinton Newsome	Sr
S	8	DeShon Singleton (injured)	Jr
DL	9	Ty Robinson	Sr
DL	10	Jimari Butler	Jr
DL	11	Cameron Lenhardt	Fr
S	12	Omar Brown	Sr
CB	13	Malcom Hartzog	So
LB	14	Chief Borders	So
CB	15	Tamon Lynum	Jr
DL	16	Elijah Jeudy	So
DL	18	Princewill Umanmielen	Fr
LB	19	Kaine Williams	So
CB	21	Dwight Bootle II (injured)	Fr
DB	22	Ashton Hausmann	Jr
S	23	Corey Collier Jr.	So
S	24	Marques Buford Jr. (injured)	Jr
DB	25	Jeremiah Charles	Fr
S	26	Koby Bretz	So
CB	28	Ethan Nation	Fr
LB	29	Eric Fields	Fr
LB	30	Randolph Kpai	So
DB	30	Javon Kinchen	Fr
DB	31	Tommi Hill	Jr
S	32	Rahmir Stewart	Fr
LB	33	Javin Wright	Sr
LB	34	Garrett Snodgrass	Sr
DB	35	D'Andre Barnes	Fr
S	36	Blake Closman	So
S	37	Phalen Sanford	Sr
DB	39	Derek Branch	So
DB	40	Brice Turner	Fr
LB	42	Mikai Gbayor	So
LB	43	Michael Booker III	So
DB	44	Syncere Safeeullah	Fr
LB	46	Grant Buda	So
LB	47	Gage Stenger	RFr
LB	48	MJ Sherman	Jr
DB	49	Mason Jones	Fr
LB	49	Danny Pasko	Fr
LB	50	Noah Bustard	Fr
LB	52	Dylan Rogers	Fr
LB	53	Jacob Bower	Fr
LB	54	Korver Demma	Fr
DL	55	Vincent Carroll-Jackson	Fr
LB	56	Grant Tagge	Jr
LB	75	Maverick Noonan (injured)	Fr
DL	80	Jacob Herbek	Sr
DL	86	A. J. Rollins	So
DL	87	Brodie Tagaloa (injured)	RFr
DL	88	Ru'Quan Buckley	So
DL	90	James Williams	So
DL	92	Sua Lefotu	Fr
DL	93	Kai Wallin	So
DL	94	Riley Van-Poppel	Fr
DL	95	Jason Maciejczak	Fr
DL	96	Leslie Black	Fr
DL	97	Blaise Gunnerson	Jr

Special teams

Pos.	#	Name	Class
PK	30	Tristan Alvano	Fr
PK	38	Timmy Bleekrode	Sr
PK	95	Spencer Pankratz	So
P	90	Jacob Hohl	Jr
LS	45	Marco Ortiz	Sr
P	18	Brian Buschini	Jr
P	39	Gage Wager	Fr
LS	96	Camden Witucki	Jr
LS	98	Will DePooter	Fr

Head coach

- Matt Rhule

Coordinators/assistant coaches

- Tony White – Associate head coach/defensive coordinator
- Marcus Satterfield – Offensive coordinator
- Ed Foley – Special teams coordinator
- E. J. Barthel – Running backs
- Evan Cooper – Secondary/defensive pass game coordinator
- Rob Dvoracek – Linebackers
- Terrance Knighton – Defensive line
- Josh Martin – Tight ends
- Garret McGuire – Wide receivers
- Donovan Raiola – Offensive line
- Corey Campbell – Strength and conditioning coach

Legend

- (C) Team captain
- (S) Suspended
- (I) Ineligible
- Injured
- Redshirt

Roster
Last update: August 29, 2023

=== Depth chart ===
Defense

ROVER
Isaac Gifford
Koby Bretz
⋅

FS
Omar Brown
Malcolm Hartzog
Corey Collier
⋅

JACK	LB	LB
Mikai Gbayor; MJ Sherman	John Bullock	Luke Reimer
Princewill Umanmielen	Nick Henrich	Javin Wright
⋅	⋅	⋅

SS
Phalen Sanford
Marques Buford (injured)
⋅

CB
Quinton Newsome
Tamon Lynum
⋅

DE	NT	DE
Jimari Butler	Nash Hutmacher	Ty Robinson
Blasie Gunnerson	Riley Van-Poppel	Cameron Lenhardt
⋅	⋅	Chief Borders

CB
Tommi Hill
Ethan Nation
⋅

Offense

WR
Alex Bullock
Jaylen Lloyd
SLOT-Billy Kemp Jaidyn Doss

LT	LG	C	RG	RT
Turner Corcorn (injured); Teddy Prochazka	Ethan Piper (injured); Justin Evans	Ben Scott	Nouredin Nouili	Bryce Benhart
Gunnar Gottula	Sam Sledge	Justin Evans	Henry Lutovsky	Tyler Knaak
⋅	⋅	⋅	⋅	⋅

TE
Thomas Fidone
Nate Boerkircher
Luke Lindenmeyer

WR
Malachi Coleman
Ty Hahn
⋅

QB
Heinrich Haarberg Chubba Purdy
Jeff Sims
⋅

Key reserves
Season-ending injury
Number of games played ()
RB Gabe Ervin (3)
RB Rahmir Johnson (3)
WR Isaiah Garcia-Castaneda (1)
WR Marcus Washington (6)
OT Turner Corcoran (7)
OG Ethan Piper (7)
CB Dwight Bootle (2)
S DeShon Singleton (5)

RB
Emmett Johnson
Anthony Grant
Joshua Fleeks

FB
Janiran Bonner
Barrett Liebentritt
⋅

Special teams
PK Tristan Alvano
P Brian Buschini
KR Tommi Hill
PR Billy Kemp
LS Marco Ortiz

== Game summaries ==
=== at Minnesota ===
Nebraska Cornhuskers (0–0) at Minnesota Golden Gophers (0–0) – Game summary

Quarter	1	2	3	4	Total
Nebraska	0	0	7	3	10
Minnesota	0	3	0	10	13

at Huntington Bank Stadium • Minneapolis, Minnesota

- Date: August 31, 2023
- Game time: 7:00 PM
- Game weather: Sunny, 79 °F (26 °C), Wind SE @ 13 mph (21 km/h)
- Game attendance: 53,629
- Referee: Larry Smith
- TV announcers (FOX): Gus Johnson (play-by-play), Joel Klatt (analyst), and Jenny Taft (sideline)
- Sources: huskers.com

Game information

Second quarter

- (12:31) MINN – Dragan Kesich 34-yard field goal (Drive: 13 plays, 67 yards, 7:41, Minnesota 3–0)

Third quarter

- (14:03) NEB – Alex Bullock 34-yard pass from Jeff Sims, Tristan Alvano kick (Drive: 2 plays, 35 yards, 0:57, Nebraska 7–3)

Fourth quarter

- (12:42) NEB – Tristan Alvano 27-yard field goal (Drive: 13 plays, 80 yards, 7:37, Nebraska 10–3)
- (2:32) MINN – Daniel Jackson 13-yard pass from Athan Kaliakmanis, Dragan Kesich kick (Drive: 10 plays, 53 yards, 2:21, 10–10)
- (0:00) MINN – Dragan Kesich 47-yard field goal (Drive: 6 plays, 22 yards, 0:58, Minnesota 13–10)

Statistics	NEB	MIN
First downs	18	20
Total yards	295	251
Rushes/yards	37/181	25/55
Passing yards	114	196
Passing: Comp–Att–Int	11–19–3	24–44–1
Time of possession	29:18	30:42

Team	Category	Player	Statistics
Nebraska	Passing	Jeff Sims	11/19, 114 yds, TD, 3 INT
Nebraska	Rushing	Jeff Sims	19 carries, 91 yds
Nebraska	Receiving	Alex Bullock	3 rec, 56 yds, TD
Minnesota	Passing	Athan Kaliakmanis	24/44, 196 yds, TD, 1 INT
Minnesota	Rushing	Sean Tyler	10 car, 41 yds
Minnesota	Receiving	Daniel Jackson	9 rec, 68 yds, TD

=== at No. 22 Colorado ===
Nebraska Cornhuskers (0–1) at No. 22 Colorado Buffaloes (1–0) – Game summary

Quarter	1	2	3	4	Total
Nebraska	0	0	7	7	14
No. 22 Colorado	0	13	10	13	36

at Folsom Field • Boulder, Colorado

- Date: September 9, 2023
- Game time: 11:00 AM
- Game weather: Sunny, 72 °F (22 °C), Wind North @ 4 mph (6 km/h)
- Game attendance: 53,241
- Referee: Kole Knueppel
- TV announcers (FOX): Gus Johnson (play-by-play), Joel Klatt (analyst), and Jenny Taft (sideline reporter)
- Sources: huskers.com

Game information

Second quarter

- (4:20) CU – Jace Feely 31-yard field goal (4 plays, 6 yards, 1:12, Colorado 3–0)
- (2:35) CU – Tar'Varish Dawson 30-yard pass from Shedeur Sanders, Jace Feely kick (1 play, 30 yards, 0:08, Colorado 10–0)
- (0:00) CU – Jace Feely 32-yard field goal (6 plays, 50 yards, 0:49, Colorado 13–0)

Third quarter

- (9:50) NEB – Jeff Sims 57-yard run, Tristan Alvano kick (4 plays, 66 yards, 2:10, Colorado 10–7)
- (6:49) CU – Xavier Weaver 12-yard pass from Shedeur Sanders, Jace Feely kick (10 plays, 75 yards, 3:01, Colorado 20–7)
- (1:20) CU – Jace Feely 30-yard field goal (8 plays, 55 yards, 3:45, Colorado 23–7)

Fourth quarter

- (10:45) CU – Tar'Varish Dawson 8-yard run (9 plays, 65 yards, 4:09, Colorado 29–7)
- (4:54) CU – Shedeur Sanders 6-yard run, Jace Feely kick (6 plays, 55 yards, 3:03, Colorado 36–7)
- (0:00) NEB – Thomas Fidone III 4-yard pass from Heinrich Haarberg, Tristan Alvano kick (6 plays, 57 yards, 1:52, Colorado 36–14)

Statistics	NEB	CU
First downs	15	24
Total yards	341	454
Rushes/yards	41/222	33/58
Passing yards	119	396
Passing: Comp–Att–Int	11–22–1	32–44–0
Time of possession	29:41	30:19

Team	Category	Player	Statistics
Nebraska	Passing	Jeff Sims	9–15, 106 yds, 1 INT
Nebraska	Rushing	Gabe Ervin Jr.	17 car, 74 yds
Nebraska	Receiving	Billy Kemp IV	5 rec, 57 yds
Colorado	Passing	Shedeur Sanders	31–42, 393 yds, 2 TD
Colorado	Rushing	Dylan Edwards	9 car, 55 yds
Colorado	Receiving	Xavier Weaver	10 rec, 170 yds, 1 TD

=== Northern Illinois ===
Northern Illinois Huskies (1–1) at Nebraska Cornhuskers (0–2) – Game summary

Quarter	1	2	3	4	Total
Northern Illinois	3	0	0	8	11
Nebraska	7	7	7	14	35

at Memorial Stadium • Lincoln, Nebraska

- Date: September 16, 2023
- Game time: 6:00 PM
- Game weather: Sunny, 79 °F (26 °C), Wind North @ 8 mph (13 km/h)
- Game attendance: 86,875
- Referee: Chris Coyte
- TV announcers (FS1): Jeff Levering (play-by-play) and Mark Helfrich (analyst)
- Sources: huskers.com

Game information

First quarter

- (9:39) NEB – Billy Kemp IV 10-yard pass from Heinrich Haarberg, Tristan Alvano kick (6 plays, 55 yards, 3:17, Nebraska 7–0)
- (3:08) NIU – Jake Seibert 30-yard field goal ('4 plays, −8 yards, 2:13, Nebraska 7–3)

Second quarter

- (3:15) NEB – Thomas Fidone II 16-yard pass from Heinrich Haarberg, Tristan Alvano kick (4 plays, 36 yards, 2:14, Nebraska 14–3)

Third quarter

- (1:00) NEB – Gabe Ervin Jr. 3-yard run, Tristan Alvano kick (14 plays, 76 yards, 7:10, Nebraska 21–3)

Fourth quarter

- (8:19) NEB – Heinrich Haarberg 20-yard run, Tristan Alvano kick (9 plays, 65 yards, 5:33, Nebraska 28–3)
- (3:23) NEB – Anthony Grant 11-yard run, Tristan Alvano kick (5 plays, 35 yards, 3:07, Nebraska 35–3)
- (0:04) NIU – Ethan Hampton 4-yard pass from Chris Carter, Billy Dozier 2-pt PAT pass from Chris Carter (11 plays, 75 yards, 3:19, Nebraska 35–11)

Statistics	NIU	NEB
First downs	12	23
Total yards	149	382
Rushes/yards	22/26	44/224
Passing yards	123	158
Passing: Comp–Att–Int	17–36–1	14–24–0
Time of possession	23:43	36:17

Team	Category	Player	Statistics
Northern Illinois	Passing	Rocky Lombardi	11/28, 73 yds, 1 INT
Northern Illinois	Rushing	Antario Brown	8 carries, 16 yds
Northern Illinois	Receiving	Davis Patterson	2 rec, 30 yds
Nebraska	Passing	Heinrich Haarberg	14/24, 158 yds, 2 TD
Nebraska	Rushing	Heinrich Haarberg	21 carries, 98 yds
Nebraska	Receiving	Thomas Fidone II	4 rec, 42 yds, 1 TD

=== Louisiana Tech ===
Louisiana Tech Bulldogs (2–2) at Nebraska Cornhuskers (1–2) – Game summary

Quarter	1	2	3	4	Total
Louisiana Tech	0	7	0	7	14
Nebraska	0	7	7	14	28

at Memorial Stadium • Lincoln, Nebraska

- Date: September 23, 2023
- Game time: 2:30 PM
- Game weather: Sunny, 71 °F (22 °C), Wind South @ 7 mph (11 km/h)
- Game attendance: 87,115
- Referee: Jerry McGinn
- TV announcers (BTN): Mark Followill (play-by-play), Matt Millen (analyst), and Meghan McKeown (sideline)
- Sources: huskers.com

Game information

Second quarter

- (11:31) NEB – Billy Kemp IV 9-yard run, Tristan Alvano kick (9 plays, 79 yards, 4:23, Nebraska 7–0)
- (6:07) LT – Jacob Fields 14-yard run, Jacob Barnes kick (10 plays, 87 yards, 5:11, 7–7)

Third quarter

- (9:57) NEB – Anthony Grant 19-yard run, Tristan Alvano kick (9 plays, 85 yards, 4:56, Nebraska 14–7)

Fourth quarter

- (14:52) NEB – Thomas Fidone II 29-yard pass from Heinrich Haarberg, Tristan Alvano kick (3 plays, 46 yards, 0:52, Nebraska 21–7)
- (11:13) NEB – Heinrich Haarberg 72-yard run, Tristan Alvano kick (3 plays, 82 yards, 1:35, Nebraska 28–7)
- (5:17) LT – Cyrus Allen 20 yard pass from Jack Turner, Jacob Barnes kick (6 plays, 51 yards, 3:22, Nebraska 28–14)

Statistics	LT	NEB
First downs	17	20
Total yards	338	419
Rushes/yards	21/46	48/312
Passing yards	292	107
Passing: Comp–Att–Int	27–42–1	8–18–0
Time of possession	28:02	31:58

Team	Category	Player	Statistics
Louisiana Tech	Passing	Jack Turner	27–42, 1 TD, 1 INT
Louisiana Tech	Rushing	Jacob Fields	6 car, 28 yds, 1 TD
Louisiana Tech	Receiving	Cyrus Allen	6 rec, 102 yds, 1 TD
Nebraska	Passing	Heinrich Haarberg	8–17, 107 yds, 1 TD
Nebraska	Rushing	Heinrich Haarberg	19 car, 157 yds, 1 TD
Nebraska	Receiving	Billy Kemp IV	5 rec, 62 yds

=== No. 2 Michigan ===
No. 2 Michigan Wolverines (4–0) at Nebraska Cornhuskers (2–2) – Game summary

Quarter	1	2	3	4	Total
#2 Michigan	14	14	7	10	45
Nebraska	0	0	0	7	7

at Memorial Stadium • Lincoln, Nebraska

- Date: September 30, 2023
- Game time: 2:30 PM
- Game weather: Sunny, 93 °F (34 °C), Wind West @ 22 mph (35 km/h)
- Game attendance: 87,134
- Referee: Greg Blum
- TV announcers (FOX): Jason Benetti (play-by-play), Brock Huard (analyst), and Allison Williams (sideline)
- Sources: huskers.com

Game information

First quarter

- (9:20) MICH – Roman Wilson 29-yard pass from J.J. McCarthy, James Turner kick (11 plays, 75 yards, 5:40, Michigan 7–0)
- (7:15) MICH – Kalel Mullings 20-yard run, James Turner kick (3 plays, 29 yards, 1:24, Michigan 14–0)

Second quarter

- (11:22) MICH – J.J. McCarthy 21-yard run, James Turner kick (9 plays, 88 yards, 5:02, Michigan 21–0)
- (0:23) MICH – Roman Wilson 16-yard pass from J.J. McCarthy, James Turner kick (8 plays, 55 yards, 3:36, Michigan 28–0)

Third quarter

- (5:58) MICH – Blake Corum 1-yard run, James Turner kick (11 plays, 78 yards, 5:50, Michigan 35–0)

Fourth quarter

- (14:17) MICH – James Turner 30-yard field goal (13 plays, 63 yards, 6:21, Michigan 38–0)
- (4:37) MICH – Peyton O'Leary 8-yard pass from Jayden Denegal, James Turner kick (10 plays, 50 yards, 5:48, Michigan 45–0)
- (4:17) NEB – Josh Fleeks 74-yard run, Tristan Alvano kick (1 play, 74 yards, 0:11, Michigan 45–7)

Statistics	MICH	NEB
First downs	26	10
Total yards	436	305
Rushes/yards	51/249	21/106
Passing yards	187	199
Passing: Comp–Att–Int	16–23–0	14–25–1
Time of possession	38:01	21:59

Team	Category	Player	Statistics
Michigan	Passing	J. J. McCarthy	12–16, 156 yds, 2 TD
Michigan	Rushing	Blake Corum	16 car, 74 yds, 1 TD
Michigan	Receiving	Roman Wilson	4 rec, 58 yds, 2 TD
Nebraska	Passing	Heinrich Haarberg	14–25, 199 yds, 1 INT
Nebraska	Rushing	Josh Fleeks	1 car, 74 yds, 1 TD
Nebraska	Receiving	Billy Kemp IV	4 rec, 61 yds

=== at Illinois ===
Nebraska Cornhuskers (2–3) at Illinois Fighting Illini (2–3) – Game summary

Quarter	1	2	3	4	Total
Nebraska	3	14	3	0	20
Illinois	0	7	0	0	7

at Memorial Stadium • Champaign, Illinois

- Date: October 6, 2023
- Game time: 7:00 PM
- Game weather: Clear, 51 °F (11 °C), Wind West @ 11 mph (18 km/h)
- Game attendance: 46,703
- Referee: Jeffrey Servinski
- TV announcers (FS1): Jeff Levering (play-by-play), Mark Helfrich (analyst)
- Sources: huskers.com

Game information

First quarter

- (1:59) NEB – Tristan Alvano 31-yard field goal (11 plays, 86 yards, 6:47, Nebraska 3–0)

Second quarter

- (6:47) NEB – Anthony Grant 1-yard run, Tristan Alvano kick (14 plays, 79 yards, 6:38, Nebraska 10–0)
- (6:37) NEB – Heinrich Haarberg 25-yard run, Tristan Alvano kick (1 play, 25 yards, 0:00, Nebraska 17–0)
- (1:31) ILL – Pat Bryant 46-yard pass from Luke Altmyer, Caleb Griffin kick (5 plays, 76 yards, 1:45, Nebraska 17–7)

Third quarter

- (8:16) NEB – Tristan Alvano 32-yard field goal (4 plays, 8 yards, 1:44, Nebraska 20–7)

Statistics	NEB	ILL
First downs	18	16
Total yards	312	310
Rushes/yards	49/158	19/21
Passing yards	154	289
Passing: Comp–Att–Int	12–24–1	29–47–1
Time of possession	37:07	22:43

Team	Category	Player	Statistics
Nebraska	Passing	Heinrich Haarberg	12–24, 154 yards, 1 INT
Nebraska	Rushing	Heinrich Haarberg	18 car, 82 yds, 1 TD
Nebraska	Receiving	Thomas Fidone II	3 rec, 42 yds
Illinois	Passing	Luke Altmyer	29–47, 289 yards, 1 TD, 1 INT
Illinois	Rushing	Kaden Feagin	5 car, 15 yards
Illinois	Receiving	Pat Bryant	4 rec, 76 yards, 1 TD

=== Northwestern ===
Northwestern Wildcats (3–3) at Nebraska Cornhuskers (3–3) – Game summary

Quarter	1	2	3	4	Total
Northwestern	3	3	0	3	9
Nebraska	3	7	0	7	17

at Memorial Stadium • Lincoln, Nebraska

- Date: October 21, 2023
- Game time: 2:30 PM
- Game weather: Sunny, 70 °F (21 °C), Wind N @ 13 mph (21 km/h)
- Game attendance: 86,769
- Referee: Mark Kluczyski
- TV announcers (BTN): Cory Provus (play-by-play), Jake Butt (analyst), Brooke Fletcher (sidelines)
- Sources: huskers.com

Game information

First quarter

- (7:18) NW – Jack Olsen 45-yard field goal (5 plays, 14 yards, 2:21, Northwestern 3–0)
- (3:11) NEB – Tristan Alvano 47-yard field goal (9 plays, 35 yards, 4:00, 3–3)

Second quarter

- (5:48) NW – Jack Olsen 37-yard field goal (10 plays, 73 yards, 5:32, Northwestern 6–3)
- (0:23) NEB – Heinrich Haarberg 3-yard run, Tristan Alvano kick (10 plays, 77 yards, 5:18, Nebraska 10–6)

Fourth quarter

- (14:03) NEB – Malachi Coleman 44-yard pass from Heinrich Haarberg, Tristan Alvano kick (1 play, 44 yards, 0:07, Nebraska 17–6)
- (11:09) NW – Jack Olsen 25-yard field goal (6 plays, 68 yards, 2:48, Nebraska 17–9)

Statistics	NW	NEB
First downs	12	14
Total yards	257	248
Rushes/yards	39/81	39/163
Passing yards	176	85
Passing: Comp–Att–Int	12–23–1	8–17–2
Time of possession	30:52	29:08

Team	Category	Player	Statistics
Northwestern	Passing	Brendan Sullivan	12–23, 176 yds, 1 INT
Northwestern	Rushing	Anthony Tyus III	6 car, 63 yds
Northwestern	Receiving	Bryce Kirtz	3 rec, 96 yds
Nebraska	Passing	Heinrich Haarberg	8–17, 85 yds, 1 TD, 2 INT
Nebraska	Rushing	Emmett Johnson	12 car, 73 yds
Nebraska	Receiving	Malachi Coleman	1 rec, 44 yds, 1 TD

=== Purdue ===
Purdue Boilermakers (2–5) at Nebraska Cornhuskers (4–3) – Game summary

Quarter	1	2	3	4	Total
Purdue	0	0	0	14	14
Nebraska	0	14	7	10	31

at Memorial Stadium • Lincoln, Nebraska

- Date: October 28, 2023
- Game time: 2:30 PM
- Game weather: Cloudy, 37 °F (3 °C), Wind NW @ 8 mph (13 km/h)
- Game attendance: 86,709
- Referee: Ron Snodgrass
- TV announcers (FS1): Jeff Levering (play-by-play), Mark Helfrich (analyst)
- Sources: huskers.com

Game information

Second quarter

- (10:43) NEB – Thomas Fidone II 1-yard pass from Heinrich Haarberg, Tristan Alvano kick (15 plays, 87 yards, 8:52, Nebraska 7–0)
- (8:54) NEB – Jaylen Lloyd 73-yard pass from Heinrich Haarberg, Tristan Alvano kick (1 play, 73 yards, 0:11, Nebraska 14–0)

Third quarter

- (12:02) NEB – Quinton Newsome 68-yard blocked field goal return, Tristan Alvano kick (Nebraska 21–0)

Fourth quarter

- (12:23) NEB – Tristan Alvano 55-yard field goal (6 plays, 14 yards, 2:32, Nebraska 24–0)
- (9:09) PUR – Jayden Dixon-Veal 29-yard pass from Hudson Card, 2PT PAT failed (3 plays, 24 yards, 0:46, Nebraska 24–6)
- (6:24) PUR – Kydran Jenkins 55-yard fumble return, Andrew Sowinski pass from Hudson Card (Nebraska 24–14)
- (3:54) NEB – Emmett Johnson 28-yard run, Tristan Alvano kick (6 plays, 48 yards, 2:29, Nebraska 31–14)

Statistics	PUR	NEB
First downs	10	14
Total yards	195	277
Rushes/yards	29/96	48/155
Passing yards	99	122
Passing: Comp–Att–Int	17–33–2	6–11–0
Time of possession	26:50	33:10

Team	Category	Player	Statistics
Purdue	Passing	Hudson Card	16–32, 100 yds, 1 TD, 2 INT
Purdue	Rushing	Devin Mockobee	7 car, 42 yds
Purdue	Receiving	Jayden Dixon-Veal	4 rec, 38 yds, 1 TD
Nebraska	Passing	Heinrich Haarberg	6–11, 122 yds, 2 TD
Nebraska	Rushing	Emmett Johnson	13 car, 76 yds, 1 TD
Nebraska	Receiving	Jaylen Lloyd	1 rec, 73 yds, 1 TD

=== at Michigan State ===
Nebraska Cornhuskers (5–3) at Michigan State Spartans (2–6) – Game summary

Quarter	1	2	3	4	Total
Nebraska	0	10	0	7	17
Michigan State	3	7	3	7	20

at Spartan Stadium • East Lansing, Michigan

- Date: November 4, 2023
- Game time: 11:00 AM
- Game weather: Sunny, 50 °F (10 °C), Wind W @ 2 mph (3 km/h)
- Game attendance: 63,134
- Referee: Jerry McGinn
- TV announcers (FS1): Tim Brando (play-by-play), Spencer Tillman (analyst)
- Sources: huskers.com

Game information

First quarter

- (11:51) MSU – Jonathan Kim 35-yard field goal (8 plays, 71 yards, 3:04, Michigan State 3–0)

Second quarter

- (12:40) NEB – Heinrich Haarberg 5-yard run, Tristan Alvano kick (10 plays, 59 yards, 4:31, Nebraska 7–3)
- (9:14) MSU – Christian Fitzpatrick 11-yard pass from Katin Houser, Jonathan Kim kick (6 plays, 75 yards, 3:26, Michigan State 10–7)
- (0:06) NEB – Tristan Alvano 24-yard field goal (12 plays, 74 yards, 4:56, 10–10)

Third quarter

- (5:11) MSU – Jonathan Kim 50-yard field goal (12 plays, 53 yards, 6:24, Michigan State 13–10)

Fourth quarter

- (12:13) MSU – Montorie Foster Jr. 25-yard pass from Sam Leavitt, Jonathan Kim kick (4 plays, 38 yards, 1:15, Michigan State 20–10)
- (3:35) NEB – Emmett Johnson 4-yard run, Tristan Alvano kick (4 plays, 65 yards, 0:56, Michigan State 20–17)

Statistics	NEB	MSU
First downs	19	11
Total yards	283	295
Rushes/yards	41/154	31/63
Passing yards	129	232
Passing: Comp–Att–Int	12–28–2	15–24–0
Time of possession	31:31	28:29

Team	Category	Player	Statistics
Nebraska	Passing	Heinrich Haarberg	12–28, 129 yds, 2 INT
Nebraska	Rushing	Emmett Johnson	13 car, 57 yds, 1 TD
Nebraska	Receiving	Thomas Fidone II	3 rec, 43 yds
Michigan State	Passing	Katin Houser	13–20, 165 yds, 1 TD
Michigan State	Rushing	Nate Carter	15 car, 50 yds
Michigan State	Receiving	Montorie Foster Jr.	4 rec, 94 yds, 1 TD

=== Maryland ===
Maryland Terrapins (5–4) at Nebraska Cornhuskers (5–4) – Game summary

Quarter	1	2	3	4	Total
Maryland	0	7	0	6	13
Nebraska	0	0	10	0	10

at Memorial Stadium • Lincoln, Nebraska

- Date: November 11, 2023
- Game time: 11:00 AM
- Game weather: Sunny, 55 °F (13 °C), Wind S @ 16 mph (26 km/h)
- Game attendance: 86,830
- Referee: Bryan Banks
- TV announcers (Peacock): Paul Burmeister (play-by-play), Kyle Rudolph (analyst), Lewis Johnson (sidelines)
- Sources: huskers.com

Game information

Second Quarter

- (2:31) MD – Tai Felton 16-yard pass from Taulia Tagovailoa, Jack Howes kick (2 plays, 69 yards, 0:33, Maryland 7–0)

Third Quarter

- (11:35) NEB – Janiran Bonner 2-yard rush, Tristan Alvano kick (6 plays, 27 yards, 2:23, 7–7)
- (8:26) NEB – Tristan Alvano 38-yard field goal (6 plays, 11 yards, 2:25, Nebraska 10–7)

Fourth Quarter

- (12:42) MD – Jack Howes 35-yard field goal (4 plays, 3 yards, 2:12, 10–10)
- (0:00) MD – Jack Howes 24-yard field goal (12 plays, 75 yards, 3:37, Maryland 13–10)

Statistics	MD	NEB
First downs	19	18
Total yards	384	269
Rushes/yards	26/101	40/183
Passing yards	283	86
Passing: Comp–Att–Int	27–40–1	10–21–4
Time of possession	28:59	31:01

Team	Category	Player	Statistics
Maryland	Passing	Taulia Tagovailoa	27–40, 283 yds, 1 TD, 1 INT
Maryland	Rushing	Roman Hemby	16 car, 74 yds
Maryland	Receiving	Jeshaun Jones	5 rec, 86 yds
Nebraska	Passing	Jeff Sims	8–13, 62 yds, 2 INT
Nebraska	Rushing	Emmett Johnson	17 car, 84 yds
Nebraska	Receiving	Billy Kemp IV	2 rec, 30 yds

=== at Wisconsin ===
Nebraska Cornhuskers (5–5) at Wisconsin Badgers (5–5) – Game summary

Quarter	1	2	3	4	OT	Total
Nebraska	14	0	0	3	0	17
Wisconsin	0	10	7	0	7	24

at Camp Randall Stadium • Madison, Wisconsin

- Date: November 18, 2023
- Game time: 6:30 PM
- Game weather: Clear, 44 °F (7 °C), Wind W @ 6 mph (10 km/h)
- Game attendance: 72,237
- Referee: Chris Coyte
- TV announcers (NBC): Noah Eagle (play-by-play), Todd Blackledge (analyst), Kathryn Tappen (sidelines)
- Sources: huskers.com

Game information

First Quarter

- (11:33) NEB – Chubba Purdy 55-yard run, Tristan Alvano kick (6 plays, 75 yards, 3:27, Nebraska 7–0)
- (6:00) NEB – Jaylen Lloyd 58 yard pass from Chubba Purdy, Tristan Alvano kick (6 plays, 76 yards, 3:35, Nebraska 14–0)

Second Quarter

- (6:37) WIS – Jackson Acker 26 yard pass from Tanner Mordecai, Nathanial Vakos kick (9 plays, 66 yards, 3:47, Nebraska 14–7)
- (1:54) WIS – Nathanial Vakos 35-yard field goal (6 plays, 35 yards, 2:00, Nebraska 14–10)

Third Quarter

- (7:47) WIS – Braelon Allen 2-yard run, Nathanial Vakos kick (10 plays, 79 yards, 4:31, Wisconsin 17–14)

Fourth Quarter

- (0:04) Nebraska – Tristan Alvano 30-yard field goal (9 plays, 68 yards, 3:33, 17–17)

Overtime

- (0:00) WIS – Braelon Allen 3-yard run, Nathanial Vakos kick (8 plays, 25 yards, Wisconsin 24–17)

Statistics	NEB	WIS
First downs	19	19
Total yards	364	316
Rushes/yards	40/195	40/156
Passing yards	169	160
Passing: Comp–Att–Int	169	160
Time of possession	15–23–1	18–28–0

Team	Category	Player	Statistics
Nebraska	Passing	Chubba Purdy	15–23, 169 yds, 1 TD, 1 INT
Nebraska	Rushing	Chubba Purdy	14 car, 105 yds, 1 TD
Nebraska	Receiving	Jaylen Lloyd	1 rec, 58 yds, 1 TD
Wisconsin	Passing	Tanner Mordecai	18–28, 160 yds, 1 TD
Wisconsin	Rushing	Braelon Allen	22 car, 62 yds, 2 TD
Wisconsin	Receiving	Will Pauling	8 rec, 79 yds

=== No. 17 Iowa ===
No. 17 Iowa Hawkeyes (9–2) at Nebraska Cornhuskers (5–6) – Game summary

Quarter	1	2	3	4	Total
No. 17 Iowa	0	10	0	3	13
Nebraska	0	7	3	0	10

at Memorial Stadium • Lincoln, Nebraska

- Date: November 24, 2023
- Game time: 11:00 AM
- Game weather: Cloudy, 26 °F (−3 °C), Wind NE @ 13 mph (21 km/h)
- Game attendance: 86,183
- Referee: Gregory Blum
- TV announcers (CBS): Tom McCarthy (play-by-play), Ross Tucker (analyst), Tiffany Blackmon (sideline)
- Sources: huskers.com

Game information

Second Quarter

- (13:22) IA – Deacon Hill 1-yard run, Drew Stevens kick (7 plays, 51 yards, 2:52, Iowa 7–0)
- (5:12) IA – Drew Stevens 28-yard field goal (13 plays, 34 yards, 6:40, Iowa 10–0)
- (3:43) NEB – Jaylen Lloyd 66-yard pass from Chubba Purdy, Tristan Alvano kick (3 plays, 65 yards, 1:29, Iowa 10–7)

Third Quarter

- (6:18) NEB – Tristan Alvano 44-yard field goal (10 plays, 43 yards, 4:23, 10–10)

Fourth Quarter

- (0:00) IA – Marshall Meeder 38-yard field goal (3 plays, 17 yards, 0:15, Iowa 13–10)

Statistics	IA	NEB
First downs	14	10
Total yards	257	264
Rushes/yards	40/163	30/75
Passing yards	94	189
Passing: Comp–Att–Int	11–28–1	15–28–1
Time of possession	31:45	28:15

Team	Category	Player	Statistics
Iowa	Passing	Deacon Hill	11–28, 94 yds, 1 INT
Iowa	Rushing	Leshon Williams	16 car, 111 yds
Iowa	Receiving	Steven Stillanos	2 rec, 38 yds
Nebraska	Passing	Chubba Purdy	15–28, 189 yds, 1 TD, 1 INT
Nebraska	Rushing	Chubba Purdy	12 car, 42 yds
Nebraska	Receiving	Jaylen Lloyd	1 rec, 66 yds, 1 TD

== Big Ten awards ==
=== Player of the week honors ===
Weekly awards
Player	Award	Week awarded	Ref.
Quinton Newsome	Big Ten Special Teams Player of the Week	Week 9	

=== All-Conference awards ===
2023 Big Ten offense all-conference teams and awards

Coaches All-Big Ten
Position	Player	Team
LB	Luke Reimer	Third team
OT	Bryce Benhart	Honorable mention
S	Omar Brown	Honorable mention
CB	Isaac Gifford	Honorable mention
DB	Tommi Hill	Honorable mention
DT	Nash Hutmacher	Honorable mention
S	Quinton Newsome	Honorable mention
DE	Ty Robinson	Honorable mention
C	Ben Scott	Honorable mention

Media All-Big Ten
Position	Player	Team
OT	Bryce Benhart	Honorable mention
S	Omar Brown	Honorable mention
LB	Jimari Butler	Honorable mention
CB	Isaac Gifford	Honorable mention
DB	Tommi Hill	Honorable mention
DT	Nash Hutmacher	Honorable mention
S	Quinton Newsome	Honorable mention
LB	Luke Reimer	Honorable mention
DE	Ty Robinson	Honorable mention
C	Ben Scott	Honorable mention

== Rankings ==
Ranking movements Legend: — = Not ranked
	Week															
Poll	Pre	1	2	3	4	5	6	7	8	9	10	11	12	13	14	Final
AP	—	—	—	—	—	—	—	—	—	—	—	—	—			
Coaches	—	—	—	—	—	—	—	—	—	—	—	—	—			
CFP	Not released									—	—	—				Not released
