= 2022 Nebraska Cornhuskers football team =

American college football season

2022 Nebraska Cornhuskers football
- Conference: Big Ten Conference
- West
- Record: 4–8 (3–6 Big Ten)
- Head coach: Scott Frost (5th season; first three games); Mickey Joseph (interim; remainder of season)
- Offensive coordinator: Mark Whipple (1st season)
- Offensive scheme: Spread
- Defensive coordinator: Erik Chinander (5th season; first four games); Bill Busch (interim; remainder of season)
- Base defense: 4–3
- Home stadium: Memorial Stadium

Uniform
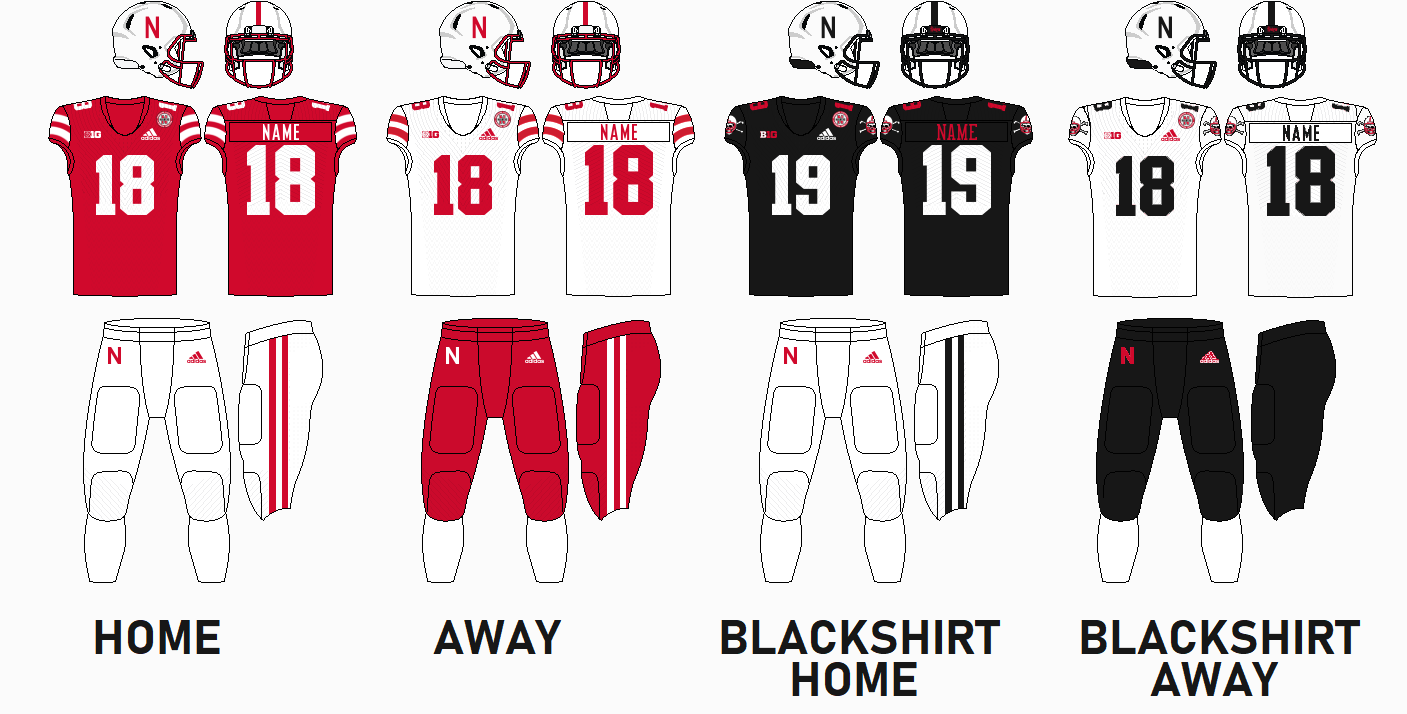

2022 Big Ten Conference football standings
	Conf.			Overall
Team	W		L	W		L
East Division
No. 3 Michigan xy$^	9	–	0	13	–	1
No. 4 Ohio State ^	8	–	1	11	–	2
No. 7 Penn State	7	–	2	11	–	2
Maryland	4	–	5	8	–	5
Indiana	2	–	7	4	–	8
Rutgers	1	–	8	4	–	8
Michigan State†	0	–	6	0	–	7
West Division
Purdue xy	6	–	3	8	–	6
Illinois	5	–	4	8	–	5
Iowa	5	–	4	8	–	5
Minnesota	5	–	4	9	–	4
Wisconsin	4	–	5	7	–	6
Nebraska	3	–	6	4	–	8
Northwestern	1	–	8	1	–	11
Championship: Michigan 43, Purdue 22
^ – College Football Playoff participant; $ – Conference champion; x – Division champion/co-champions; y – Championship game participant; † — NCAA vacated all wins for Michigan State (5–7, 3–6); Rankings from AP Poll

The 2022 Nebraska Cornhuskers football team represented the University of Nebraska as a member of the West Division of the Big Ten Conference during the 2022 NCAA Division I FBS football season. The team played their home games at Memorial Stadium in Lincoln, Nebraska.

After starting the season with two losses in their first three games, including a loss to Georgia Southern, head coach Scott Frost was fired on September 11; receivers coach and associate head coach Mickey Joseph was named interim head coach for the remainder of the season. The following week, after having given up nearly school record number of yards to opposing offenses in back-to-back weeks, Nebraska dismissed defensive coordinator Erik Chinander and promoted assistant Bill Busch to the position for the remainder of the season.

On November 26, 2022, Nebraska announced the hiring of Matt Rhule to become the 31st head coach of the Nebraska football program.

== Preseason ==
=== Award watch lists ===
Award	Player	Position	Year
Butkus Award	Luke Reimer	LB	JR
Bronko Nagurski Trophy	Ochaun Mathis	DE	SR
Lott IMPACT Trophy	Luke Reimer	LB	JR
Ray Guy Award	Brian Buschini	P	SO

=== Big Ten Media Days ===
==== Preseason Media Poll ====
The annual Cleveland.com Preseason Big Ten Media Poll.

East
Predicted finish	Team	Points (1st place votes)
1	Ohio State	252 (36)
2	Michigan	203
3	Penn State	169
4	Michigan State	162
5	Maryland	104
6	Rutgers	60
7	Indiana	58

West
Predicted finish	Team	Points (1st place votes)
1	Wisconsin	246 (31)
2	Iowa	198 (3)
3	Minnesota	162 (2)
4	Purdue	153
5	Nebraska	123
6	Illinois	65
7	Northwestern	61

Media poll (Big Ten Championship)
Rank	Team	Votes
1	Ohio State over Wisconsin	31
2	Ohio State over Iowa	3
3	Ohio State over Minnesota	2

== Schedule ==
Date	Time	Opponent	Site	TV	Result	Attendance
August 27	11:30 a.m.	vs. Northwestern	Aviva Stadium; Dublin, Ireland (Aer Lingus College Football Classic)	FOX	L 28–31	42,699
September 3	2:30 p.m.	North Dakota*	Memorial Stadium; Lincoln, NE	BTN	W 38–17	86,590
September 10	6:30 p.m.	Georgia Southern*	Memorial Stadium; Lincoln, NE	FS1	L 42–45	86,862
September 17	11:00 a.m.	No. 6 Oklahoma*	Memorial Stadium; Lincoln, NE (rivalry, Big Noon Kickoff)	FOX	L 14–49	87,161
October 1	6:30 p.m.	Indiana^{†}	Memorial Stadium; Lincoln, NE	BTN	W 35–21	86,804
October 7	6:00 p.m.	at Rutgers	SHI Stadium; Piscataway, NJ	FS1	W 14–13	53,752
October 15	6:30 p.m.	at Purdue	Ross–Ade Stadium; West Lafayette, IN	BTN	L 37–43	61,320
October 29	2:30 p.m.	No. 17 Illinois	Memorial Stadium; Lincoln, NE	ABC	L 9–26	86,691
November 5	11:00 a.m.	Minnesota	Memorial Stadium; Lincoln, NE (rivalry)	ESPN2	L 13–20	86,284
November 12	2:30 p.m.	at No. 3 Michigan	Michigan Stadium; Ann Arbor, MI	ABC	L 3–34	110,192
November 19	11:00 a.m.	Wisconsin	Memorial Stadium; Lincoln, NE (rivalry)	ESPN	L 14–15	86,068
November 25	3:00 p.m.	at Iowa	Kinnick Stadium; Iowa City, IA (rivalry)	BTN	W 24–17	69,250
*Non-conference game; ^{†}Homecoming; Rankings from AP Poll (and CFP Rankings,); All times are in Central time

== Personnel ==
=== Roster ===
2022 Nebraska Cornhuskers football team roster
Players
Coaches
Offense

Pos.	#	Name	Class
RB	0	Jaquez Yant	So
WR	1	Decoldest Crawford (injured)	Fr
WR/CB	2	Tommi Hill	So
QB	3	Cooper Hausmann	Fr
WR	3	Trey Palmer	Jr
WR	4	Alante Brown	So
WR	5	Omar Manning	GS
QB	6	Chubba Purdy	So
QB	7	Mikey Pauley	Fr
WR	7	Marcus Washington	Jr
QB	8	Logan Smothers	So
RB	9	Ajay Allen (injured)	Fr
RB	10	Anthony Grant	Jr
QB	10	Heinrich Haarberg	RFr
QB	11	Casey Thompson	Sr
WR	12	Janiran Bonner	Fr
WR	13	Kamonte Grimes	RFr
RB	14	Rahmir Johnson	Jr
QB	15	Richard Torres	Fr
QB	16	Jarrett Synek	RFr
WR	16	Zach Weinmaster	Jr
WR	17	Ty Hahn	So
QB	18	Matt Masker	Sr
WR	19	Barron Miles Jr.	So
RB	21	Emmett Johnson	Fr
RB	22	Gabe Ervin Jr.	RFr
TE	24	Thomas Fidone II (injured)	RFr
WR	26	Roman Mangini	Fr
RB	28	Matthew Schuster	RFr
RB	29	Cooper Jewett	Jr
WR	32	Brody Belt	Sr
RB	34	Beau Psencik	So
RB	35	Trevin Luben	So
WR	36	Taveon Thompson	RFr
RB	37	Isaiah Harris	So
WR	41	Elliott Brown	So
RB	44	Aiden Young	RFr
WR	45	Truitt Robinson	RFr
TE	46	John Goodwin	Jr
TE	47	Chase Androff	Fr
TE	48	Evan Meyersick	RFr
TE	49	Nate Boerkircher	So
OL	50	Sam Hoskinson	RFr
OL	51	Justin Evans-Jenkins	Fr
OL	53	Riley Moses	Jr
OL	54	Bryce Benhart	Jr
OL	57	Ethan Piper	Jr
OL	58	Ian Boerkircher	Sr
OL	59	Henry Lutovsky	RFr
OL	61	Dylan Parrott	Fr
OL	63	Nouredin Nouili (S)	Jr
OL	65	Teddy Prochazka (injured)	So
OL	66	Ezra Miller	Jr
OL	67	Joey Mancino	RFr
OL	69	Turner Corcoran	So
OL	70	Keegan Menning	So
OL	73	Broc Bando	GS
OL	74	Brant Banks	Jr
OL	75	Trent Hixson	GS
OL	76	Beau Schaller	RFr
OL	76	Eli Simonson	So
OL	77	Hunter Anthony	Sr
OL	77	Michael Lynn	Jr
OL	78	Kevin Williams Jr. (injured)	Sr
OL	79	Alex Conn	So
WR	80	Shawn Hardy II	RFr
TE	81	James Carnie	RFr
TE	82	Chancellor Brewington	Sr
TE	83	Travis Vokolek (C)	GS
WR	84	Alex Bullock	RFr
WR	85	Wyatt Liewer	Sr
TE	86	A. J. Rollins	RFr
TE	87	Chris Hickman	Jr
WR	88	Victor Jones	Fr
WR	89	Oliver Martin	GS
TE	99	Luke Lindenmeyer	Fr

Defense

Pos.	#	Name	Class
EDGE	0	Jake Appleget	Fr
S	1	Marques Buford Jr.	So
EDGE	2	Caleb Tannor (C)	Sr
LB	5	Eteva Mauga-Clements	Sr
CB	6	Quinton Newsome	Jr
CB	7	Tamon Lynum	So
S	8	Myles Farmer	Jr
S	9	DeShon Singleton	So
EDGE	10	Jimari Butler	So
CB	11	Braxton Clark	Sr
NB	12	Omar Brown	Jr
CB	13	Malcom Hartzog	Fr
LB	14	Mikai Gbayor	RFr
LB	15	Ernest Hausmann	Fr
CB	17	Tyreke Johnson	Sr
S	17	Jalil Martin	Fr
DB	18	Jaeden Gould	Fr
LB	19	Seth Malcom	RFr
S	19	Kaine Williams	RFr
S	21	Noa Pola-Gates	Jr
NB	23	Isaac Gifford	So
CB	24	Brandon Moore	GS
CB	25	Javier Morton	So
DB	26	Koby Bretz	RFr
LB	28	Luke Reimer	Jr
DB	29	Ashton Hausmann	So
LB	30	Randolph Kpai	RFr
LB	31	Chris Kolarevic	Sr
EDGE	32	Ochaun Mathis	Sr
NB	33	Javin Wright	Jr
EDGE	34	Simon Otte	Sr
DB	35	Derek Branch	RFr
NB	35	John Bullock	Jr
DB	36	Blake Closman	RFr
S	37	Phalen Sanford	Jr
DB	40	Darius Moore	Sr
DB	41	Christian Lilienkamp	RFr
LB	41	Garrett Snodgrass	Jr
LB	42	Nick Henrich (C)	Jr
DB	43	Michael Booker III	RFr
EDGE	44	Garrett Nelson (C)	Jr
DB	45	Blake Miller	Fr
NB	46	Grant Buda	RFr
NB	47	Gage Stenger	Fr
DL	50	Jailen Weaver	RFr
EDGE	51	Braden Klover	So
DL	52	Mosai Newsom	Jr
LB	53	Jake Archer	Sr
EDGE	54	Ryan Schommer	Sr
LB	56	Grant Tagge	So
DL	63	Ru'Quan Buckley	RFr
DL	72	Nash Hutmacher	So
DL	80	Jacob Herbek	Jr
DL	82	Colton Feist	Sr
DL	87	Brodie Tagaloa	Fr
DL	90	Stephon Wynn	Sr
DL	91	Devin Drew	Sr
DL	96	Marquis Black	So
EDGE	97	Blaise Gunnerson	So
DL	99	Ty Robinson	Jr

Special teams

Pos.	#	Name	Class
PK	24	Charlie Weinrich	Fr
PK	36	Chase Contreraz	Jr
PK	49	Timmy Bleekrode	So
LS	55	Brady Weas	Sr
PK	79	Spencer Pankratz	RFr
P	90	Jacob Hohl	So
LS	91	Cameron Pieper	Sr
PK	92	Brendan Franke	So
PK	93	Gabe Heins	Jr
LS	94	Cade Mueller	Sr
P	95	Brian Buschini	So
P	95	Grant Detlefsen	Jr
LS	96	Camden Witucki	So

Head coach

- Scott Frost
- Mickey Joseph – (Interim) Head Coach/wide receivers/passing game coordinator

Coordinators/assistant coaches

- Erik Chinander – Defensive coordinator
- Mark Whipple – Offensive coordinator/quarterbacks
- Bill Busch – Special teams coordinator/(Interim) defensive coordinator
- Joey Connors – (Interim) Special Teams Coordinator
- Donovan Raiola – Offensive line
- Sean Beckton – Tight ends
- Mike Dawson – Defensive line/Edge
- Travis Fisher – Defensive backs
- Bryan Applewhite – Running backs
- Barrett Ruud – Linebackers
- Steve Cooper – Senior offensive analyst and (Interim) quarterbacks coach
- Mike Cassano – Offensive analyst
- Zach Duval – Strength and conditioning coach

Legend

- (C) Team captain
- (S) Suspended
- (I) Ineligible
- Injured
- Redshirt

Roster
Last update: July 6, 2022

=== Depth chart ===
Defense

FS
Marques Buford
Phalen Sanford
⋅

NICKEL	LB	LB
Isaac Gifford	Ernest Hausmann Nick Henrich (injured)	Luke Reimer
Omar Brown	Chris Kolarevic	Eteva Mauga-Clements
⋅	⋅	⋅

SS
Myles Farmer
DeShon Singleton
⋅

CB
Quinton Newsome
Brandon Moore
⋅

DE	DT	DT	DE
Garrett Nelson	Ty Robinson	Colton Feist	SLB-Caleb Tannor Ochaun Mathis
Blasie Gunnerson	Nash Hutmacher	Stephon Wynn	Jimari Butler
⋅	⋅	⋅	⋅

CB
Malcolm Hartzog
Braxton Clark
⋅

Offense

WR
Trey Palmer
Brody Belt
⋅

WR
Alante Brown
Wyatt Liewer
⋅

LT	LG	C	RG	RT
Turner Corcoran	Ethan Piper	Trent Hixson	Broc Bando	Bryce Benhart
Brant Banks	Brant Banks	Ethan Piper	Henry Lutovsky	Hunter Anthony
⋅	⋅	⋅	⋅	⋅

TE
Travis Vokolek
Nate Boerkircher
Chancellor Brewington

WR
Marcus Washington
Oliver Martin
⋅

QB
Casey Thompson
Chubba Purdy
Logan Smothers

Key reserves
Season-ending injury Number of games played ()
RB Ajay Allen (4)
OT Teddy Prochazka (3)
OL Kevin Williams (4)
TE Thomas Fidone (0)
LB Nick Henrich (5)

Special teams
PK Timmy Bleekrode
P Brian Buschini
KR Tommi Hill
PR Oilver Martin
LS Cameron Piper

RB
Anthony Grant
Jaquez Yant
Gabe Ervin
Rahmir Johnson

== Game summaries ==
=== vs Northwestern (Ireland) ===
Northwestern Wildcats (0–0) vs Nebraska Cornhuskers (0–0) – Game summary

Quarter	1	2	3	4	Total
Wildcats	3	14	7	7	31
Cornhuskers	7	7	14	0	28

at Aviva Stadium • Dublin, Ireland

- Date: August 27, 2022
- Game time: 4:30 p.m. GMT
- Game weather: Sunny, 65 °F (18 °C)
- Game attendance: 42,699
- Referee: Mark Cannon
- TV announcers (FOX): Jason Benetti (play-by-play) and Brock Huard (analyst)
- Sources: huskers.com

Game information

First quarter

- (12:41) NEB – Isaiah Garcia-Castaneda 32-yard pass from Casey Thompson, Timmy Bleekrode kick (Drive: 8 plays, 75 yards, 2:19; Nebraska 7–0)
- (2:13) NW – Adam Stage 35-yard field goal (Drive: 9 plays, 35 yards, 4:28; Nebraska 7–3)

Second quarter

- (11:59) NEB – Casey Thompson 1-yard run, Timmy Bleekrode kick (Drive: 14 plays, 80 yards, 5:14; Nebraska 14–3)
- (10:58) NW – Raymond Niro III 41-yard pass from Ryan Hilinski, Adam Stage kick (Drive: 4 plays, 75 yards, 1:01; Nebraska 14–10)
- (0:25) NW – Donny Navarro III 6-yard pass from Ryan Hilinski, Adam Stage kick (Drive: 13 plays, 82 yards, 3:15; Northwestern 17–14)

Third quarter

- (9:37) NEB – Anthony Grant 3-yard run, Timmy Bleekrode kick (Drive: 8 plays, 88 yards, 3:24; Nebraska 21–17)
- (9:09) NEB – Anthony Grant 46-yard run, Timmy Bleekrode kick (Drive: 2 plays, 46 yards, 0:17; Nebraska 28–17)
- (7:53) NW – Cam Porter 3-yard run, Adam Stage kick (Drive: 5 plays, 44 yards, 1:16; Nebraska 28–24)

Fourth quarter

- (11:34) NW – Evan Hull 4-yard run, Adam Stage kick (Drive: 6 plays, 42 yards, 0:50; Northwestern 31–28)

Statistics	NW	NEB
First downs	25	23
Total yards	528	465
Rushes/yards	47–214	31–110
Passing yards	314	355
Passing: Comp–Att–Int	27–38–0	25–42–2
Time of possession	34:14	25:46

Team	Category	Player	Statistics
Northwestern	Passing	Ryan Hilinski	27/38, 314 yards, 2 TD
Northwestern	Rushing	Evan Hull	22 carries, 119 yards, TD
Northwestern	Receiving	Malik Washington	8 receptions, 97 yards
Nebraska	Passing	Casey Thompson	25/42, 355 yards, TD, INT
Nebraska	Rushing	Anthony Grant	19 carries, 101 yards, 2 TD
Nebraska	Receiving	Isaiah Garcia-Castaneda	4 receptions, 120 yards, TD

=== vs North Dakota (FCS) ===
North Dakota Fighting Hawks (0–0) vs Nebraska Cornhuskers (0–1) – Game summary

Quarter	1	2	3	4	Total
Fighting Hawks	0	7	10	0	17
Cornhuskers	7	0	17	14	38

at Memorial Stadium • Lincoln, NE

- Date: September 3, 2022
- Game time: 2:40 p.m.
- Game weather: Sunny, 79 °F (26 °C)
- Game attendance: 86,590
- Referee: Bryan Banks
- TV announcers (BTN): Brandon Gaudin (play-by-play), Joshua Perry (analyst), and Rick Pizzo (sideline)
- Sources: huskers.com

Game information

First quarter

- (6:46) NEB – Anthony Grant 19-yard run, Timmy Bleekrode kick (Drive: 8 plays, 87 yards, 2:02; Nebraska 7–0)

Second quarter

- (0:13) UND – Adam Zavalney 1-yard pass from Tommy Schuster, Brady Stevens kick (Drive: 16 plays, 80 yards, 6:51; Tied 7–7)

Third quarter

- (13:12) NEB – Nate Boerkircher 19-yard pass from Casey Thompson, Timmy Bleekrode kick (Drive: 6 plays, 75 yards, 1:48; Nebraska 14–7)
- (8:36) NEB – Timmy Bleekrode 46-yard field goal (Drive: 5 plays, 18 yards, 0:56; Nebraska 17–7)
- (5:52) UND – Brady Stevens 23-yard field goal (Drive: 6 plays, 69 yards, 2:44; Nebraska 17–10)
- (4:22) UND – Tyler Hoosman 5-yard run, Brady Stevens kick (Drive: 2 plays, 8 yards, 0:44; Tied 17–17)
- (2:30) NEB – Anthony Grant 46-yard run, Timmy Bleekrode kick (Drive: 5 plays, 75 yards, 1:48; Nebraska 24–17)

Fourth quarter

- (6:35) NEB – Ajay Allen 14-yard run, Timmy Bleekrode kick (Drive: 11 plays, 89 yards, 4:25; Nebraska 31–17)
- (2:07) NEB – Chancellor Brewington 5-yard pass Casey Thompson, Timmy Bleekrode kick (Drive: 6 plays, 33 yards, 3:31; Nebraska 38–17)

Statistics	UND	NEB
First downs	18	26
Total yards	306	437
Rushes/yards	33–175	41–224
Passing yards	131	193
Passing: Comp–Att–Int	24–37–0	14–21–1
Time of possession	36:01	23:59

Team	Category	Player	Statistics
North Dakota	Passing	Tommy Schuster	24/37, 131 yards, TD
North Dakota	Rushing	Isaiah Smith	10 carries, 104 yards
North Dakota	Receiving	Bo Belquist	6 receptions, 40 yards
Nebraska	Passing	Casey Thompson	14/21, 193 yards, 2 TD, INT
Nebraska	Rushing	Anthony Grant	23 carries, 189 yards, 2 TD
Nebraska	Receiving	Trey Palmer	4 receptions, 82 yards

=== vs Georgia Southern ===
Georgia Southern Eagles (1–0) vs Nebraska Cornhuskers (1–1) – Game summary

Quarter	1	2	3	4	Total
Eagles	14	14	7	10	45
Cornhuskers	7	21	7	7	42

at Memorial Stadium • Lincoln, NE

- Date: September 10, 2022
- Game time: 6:30 p.m.
- Game weather: Cloudy, 63 °F (17 °C)
- Game attendance: 86,862
- Referee: Jeffrey Servinski
- TV announcers (FS1): Noah Eagle (play-by-play) and Mark Helfrich (analyst)
- Sources: huskers.com

Game information

First quarter

- (8:02) GASO – Jalen White 2-yard run, Alex Raynor kick (Drive: 13 plays, 74 yards, 4:59; Georgia Southern 7–0)
- (4:17) NEB – Casey Thompson 8-yard run, Timmy Bleekrode kick (Drive: 9 plays, 75 yards, 3:45; Tied 7–7)
- (2:21) GASO – Jalen White 26-yard run, Alex Raynor kick (Drive: 8 plays, 75 yards, 1:56; Georgia Southern 14–7)

Second quarter

- (13:40) NEB – Brody Belt 21-yard pass from Casey Thompson, Timmy Bleekrode kick (Drive: 10 plays, 75 yards, 3:41; Tied 14–14)
- (8:25) NEB – Anthony Grant 4-yard run, Timmy Bleekrode kick (Drive: 10 plays, 76 yards, 4:33; Nebraska 21–14)
- (7:27) GASO – Gerald Green 1-yard run, Alex Raynor kick (Drive: 3 plays, 75 yards, 0:58; Tied 21–21)
- (4:00) GASO – Gerald Green 47-yard run, Alex Raynor kick (Drive: 5 plays, 80 yards, 1:54; Georgia Southern 28–21)
- (1:50) NEB – Casey Thompson 2-yard run, Timmy Bleekrode kick (Drive: 6 plays, 75 yards, 2:10; Tied 28–28)

Third quarter

- (12:12) GASO – Amare Jones 10-yard pass from Kyle Vantrease, Alex Raynor kick (Drive: 8 plays, 75 yards, 2:48; Georgia Southern 35–28)
- (3:18) NEB – Ajay Allen 7-yard run, Timmy Bleekrode kick (Drive: 13 plays, 84 yards, 4:59; Tied 35–35)

Fourth quarter

- (14:42) GASO – Alex Raynor 19-yard field goal (Drive: 10 plays, 77 yards, 3:29; Georgia Southern 38–35)
- (3:05) NEB – Casey Thompson 1-yard run, Timmy Bleekrode kick (Drive: 15 plays, 98 yards, 5:58; Nebraska 42–38)
- (0:36) GASO – Kyle Vantrease 8-yard run, Alex Raynor kick (Drive: 11 plays, 75 yards, 2:29; Georgia Southern 45–42)

Statistics	GASO	NEB
First downs	34	33
Total yards	642	575
Rushes/yards	30–233	47–257
Passing yards	409	318
Passing: Comp–Att–Int	37–56–2	23–34–0
Time of possession	28:04	31:56

Team	Category	Player	Statistics
Georgia Southern	Passing	Kyle Vantrease	37/56, 409 yards, TD, 2 INT
Georgia Southern	Rushing	Gerald Green	10 carries, 132 yards, 2 TD
Georgia Southern	Receiving	Derwin Burgess Jr.	12 receptions, 119 yards
Nebraska	Passing	Casey Thompson	23/34, 318 yards, TD
Nebraska	Rushing	Anthony Grant	27 carries, 138 yards, TD
Nebraska	Receiving	Marcus Washington	6 receptions, 123 yards

=== vs No. 6 Oklahoma ===
No. 6 Oklahoma Sooners (2–0) vs Nebraska Cornhuskers (1–2) – Game summary

Quarter	1	2	3	4	Total
No. 6 Sooners	14	21	14	6	55
Cornhuskers	7	0	0	7	14

at Memorial Stadium • Lincoln, NE

- Date: September 17, 2022
- Game time: 11:00 a.m.
- Game weather: Cloudy, 69 °F (21 °C)
- Game attendance: 87,161
- Referee: David Alvarez
- TV announcers (FOX): Gus Johnson (1st half)/Brady Quinn (2nd half) (play-by-play), Joel Klatt (analyst), and Jenny Taft (sideline)
- Sources: huskers.com

Game information

First quarter

- (11:19) NEB – Trey Palmer 32-yard pass from Casey Thompson, Timmy Bleekrode kick (Drive: 6 plays, 77 yards, 1:57; Nebraska 7–0)
- (9:30) OKLA – Dillon Gabriel 61-yard run, Zach Schmitt kick (Drive: 5 plays, 75 yards, 1:49; Tied 7–7)
- (1:57) OKLA – Jalil Farooq 25-yard pass from Dillon Gabriel, Zach Schmitt kick (Drive: 7 plays, 63 yards, 2:17; Oklahoma 14–7)

Second quarter

- (14:48) OKLA – Marcus Major 1-yard run, Zach Schmitt kick (Drive: 5 plays, 23 yards, 0:55; Oklahoma 21–7)
- (11:35) OKLA – Marcus Major 24-yard pass from Brayden Willis, Zach Schmitt kick (Drive: 6 plays, 63 yards, 1:55; Oklahoma 28–7)
- (1:44) OKLA – Eric Gray 16-yard run, Zach Schmitt kick (Drive: 5 plays, 65 yards, 1:10; Oklahoma 35–7)

Third quarter

- (13:13) OKLA – Eric Gray 21-yard run, Zach Schmitt kick (Drive: 7 plays, 46 yards, 1:41; Oklahoma 42–7)
- (8:59) OKLA – Theo Wease 15-yard pass from Dillon Gabriel, Zach Schmitt kick (Drive: 9 plays, 60 yards, 3:10; Oklahoma 49–7)

Fourth quarter

- (3:17) NEB – Chubba Purdy 8-yard run, Timmy Bleekrode kick (Drive: 13 plays, 82 yards, 5:04; Oklahoma 49–14)

Statistics	OKLA	NEB
First downs	31	21
Total yards	580	327
Rushes/yards	54–312	45–163
Passing yards	268	164
Passing: Comp–Att–Int	19–30–0	21–31–1
Time of possession	29:36	30:24

Team	Category	Player	Statistics
Oklahoma	Passing	Dillon Gabriel	16/27, 230 yards, 2 TD
Oklahoma	Rushing	Eric Gray	11 carries, 113 yards, 2 TD
Oklahoma	Receiving	Marvin Mims	4 receptions, 66 yards
Nebraska	Passing	Casey Thompson	14/20, 129 yards, TD
Nebraska	Rushing	Gabe Ervin Jr.	7 carries, 60 yards
Nebraska	Receiving	Trey Palmer	10 receptions, 92 yards, 1 TD

=== vs Indiana ===
Indiana Hoosiers (3–1) vs Nebraska Cornhuskers (1–3) – Game summary

Quarter	1	2	3	4	Total
Hoosiers	0	21	0	0	21
Cornhuskers	7	14	0	14	35

at Memorial Stadium • Lincoln, NE

- Date: October 1, 2022
- Game time: 6:30 p.m.
- Game weather: Sunny, 76 °F (24 °C)
- Game attendance: 86,804
- Referee: Reggie Smith
- TV announcers (BTN): Mark Followill (play-by-play), Matt Millen (analyst), and Meghan McKeown (sideline)
- Sources: huskers.com

Game information

First quarter

- (13:17) NEB – Oliver Martin 34-yard pass from Casey Thompson, Timmy Bleekrode kick (Drive: 3 plays, 72 yards, 0:47; Nebraska 7–0)

Second quarter

- (12:17) IU – Myles Jackson 0-yard fumble return, Charles Campbell kick (Drive: 3 plays, −9 yards, 1:09; Tied 7–7)
- (10:03) NEB – Malcolm Hertzog 30-yard blocked punt return, Timmy Bleekrode kick (Drive: 3 plays, 1 yard, 0:51; Nebraska 14–7)
- (5:54) NEB – Jaquez Yant 1-yard run, Timmy Bleekrode kick (Drive: 8 plays, 55 yards, 3:08; Nebraska 21–7)
- (3:09) IU – Emery Simmons 13-yard pass from Connor Bazelak, Charles Campbell kick (Drive: 7 plays, 75 yards, 2:45; Nebraska 21–14)
- (0:15) IU – Shaun Shivers 1-yard run, Charles Campbell kick (Drive: 6 plays, 70 yards, 1:53; Tied 21–21)

Third quarter

None'

Fourth quarter

- (13:43) NEB – Trey Palmer 71-yard pass from Casey Thompson, Timmy Bleekrode kick (Drive: 3 plays, 87 yards, 0:59; Nebraska 28–21)
- (6:53) NEB – Casey Thompson 1-yard run, Timmy Bleekrode kick (Drive: 12 plays, 54 yards, 6:05; Nebraska 35–21)

Statistics	IU	NEB
First downs	14	22
Total yards	290	385
Rushes/yards	23–67	51–115
Passing yards	223	270
Passing: Comp–Att–Int	22–44–1	18–27–1
Time of possession	25:09	34:51

Team	Category	Player	Statistics
Indiana	Passing	Connor Bazelak	22/44, 223 yards, TD, INT
Indiana	Rushing	Jaylin Lucas	3 carries, 39 yards
Indiana	Receiving	Emery Simmons	6 receptions, 57 yards, TD
Nebraska	Passing	Casey Thompson	18/27, 270 yards, 2 TD, INT
Nebraska	Rushing	Anthony Grant	32 carries, 136 yards
Nebraska	Receiving	Trey Palmer	8 receptions, 157 yards, 1 TD

=== at Rutgers ===
Nebraska Cornhuskers (2–3) at Rutgers Scarlet Knights (3–2) – Game summary

Quarter	1	2	3	4	Total
Cornhuskers	0	0	7	7	14
Scarlet Knights	10	3	0	0	13

at SHI Stadium • Piscataway, NJ

- Date: October 7, 2022
- Game time: 7:00 p.m. EST
- Game weather: Cloudy, 69 °F (21 °C)
- Game attendance: 53,752
- Referee: Mark Kluczynski
- TV announcers (FS1): Adam Alexander (play-by-play) and Devin Gardner (analyst)
- Sources: huskers.com

Game information

First quarter

- (12:22) RUTG – Noah Vedral 21-yard run, Jude McAtamney kick (Drive: 6 plays, 75 yards, 2:38; Rutgers 7–0)
- (2:29) RUTG – Jude McAtamney 25-yard field goal (Drive: 4 plays, 2 yards, 1:27; Rutgers 10–0)

Second quarter

- (6:30) RUTG – Jude McAtamney 40-yard field goal (Drive: 7 plays, 43 yards, 2:32; Rutgers 13–0)

Third quarter

- (10:35) NEB – Travis Vokolek 7-yard pass from Casey Thompson, Timmy Bleekrode kick (Drive: 9 plays, 70 yards, 4:25; Rutgers 13–7)

Fourth quarter

- (8:54) NEB – Trey Palmer 27-yard pass from Casey Thompson, Timmy Bleekrode kick (Drive: 1 play, 27 yards, 0:06; Nebraska 14–13)

Statistics	NEB	RUTG
First downs	18	14
Total yards	304	348
Rushes/yards	29–72	38–115
Passing yards	232	233
Passing: Comp–Att–Int	24–37–2	12–30–3
Time of possession	31:40	28:20

Team	Category	Player	Statistics
Nebraska	Passing	Casey Thompson	24/36, 232 yards, 2 TD, 2 INT
Nebraska	Rushing	Anthony Grant	19 carries, 47 yards
Nebraska	Receiving	Trey Palmer	4 receptions, 64 yards, 1 TD
Rutgers	Passing	Noah Vedral	6/15, 133 yards
Rutgers	Rushing	Samuel Brown V	16 carries, 63 yards
Rutgers	Receiving	Shameen Jones	2 receptions, 76 yards

=== at Purdue ===
Nebraska Cornhuskers (3–3) at Purdue Boilermakers (4–2) – Game summary

Quarter	1	2	3	4	Total
Cornhuskers	0	13	17	7	37
Boilermakers	10	17	7	9	43

at Ross-Ade Stadium • West Lafayette, IN

- Date: October 15, 2022
- Game time: 7:30 p.m. EST
- Game weather: Cloudy, 52 °F (11 °C)
- Game attendance: 61,320
- Referee: Michael Canon
- TV announcers (BTN): Cory Provus (play-by-play), Matt Millen (analyst), and Elise Menaker (sideline)
- Sources: huskers.com

Game information

First quarter

- (5:54) PUR – T. J. Sheffield 2-yard pass from Aidan O'Connell, Mitchell Fineran kick (Drive: 9 plays, 80 yards, 3:40; Purdue 7–0)
- (1:09) PUR – Mitchell Fineran 37-yard field goal (Drive: 9 plays, 38 yards, 3:00; Purdue 10–0)

Second quarter

- (13:16) NEB – Jaquez Yant 1-yard run, Timmy Bleekrode kick (Drive: 8 plays, 76 yards, 2:49; Purdue 10–7)
- (9:01) NEB – Timmy Bleekrode 36-yard field goal (Drive: 6 plays, 43 yards, 2:10; Tied 10–10)
- (5:49) PUR – Charlie Jones 31-yard pass from Aidan O'Connell, Mitchell Fineran kick (Drive: 7 plays, 75 yards, 3:12; Purdue 17–10)
- (4:44) PUR– Mitchell Fineran 37-yard field goal (Drive: 4 plays, 5 yards, 0:46; Purdue 20–10)
- (0:35) PUR – Devin Mockobee 1-yard run, Mitchell Fineran kick (Drive: 7 plays, 39 yards, 2:13; Purdue 27–10)
- (0:00) NEB – Timmy Bleekrode 43-yard field goal (Drive: 5 plays, 50 yards, 0:35; Purdue 27–13)

Third quarter

- (13:51) NEB – Trey Palmer 37-yard pass from Casey Thompson, Timmy Bleekrode kick (Drive: 4 plays, 71 yards, 1:04; Purdue 27–20)
- (5:17) NEB – Timmy Bleekrode 22-yard field goal (Drive: 6 plays, 72 yards, 1:05; Purdue 27–23)
- (2:18) PUR – T. J. Sheffield 28-yard pass from Aidan O'Connell, Mitchell Fineran kick (Drive: 6 plays, 75 yards, 2:59; Purdue 34–23)
- (1:46) NEB – Trey Palmer 72-yard pass from Casey Thompson, Timmy Bleekrode kick (Drive: 2 plays, 75 yards, 0:32; Purdue 34–30)

Fourth quarter

- (10:00) PUR – Mitchell Fineran 34-yard field goal (Drive: 15 plays, 72 yards, 6:41; Purdue 37–30)
- (6:55) PUR – Charlie Jones 2-yard from Aidan O'Connell (Drive: 6 plays, 62 yards, 2:08; Purdue 43–30)
- (5:55) NEB – Anthony Grant 1-yard run, Timmy Bleekrode kick (Drive: 3 plays, 70 yards, 0:55; Purdue 43–37)

Statistics	NEB	PUR
First downs	15	38
Total yards	476	608
Rushes/yards	23–122	47–217
Passing yards	354	391
Passing: Comp–Att–Int	16–29–2	35–54–1
Time of possession	17:18	42:42

Team	Category	Player	Statistics
Nebraska	Passing	Casey Thompson	16/29, 354 yards, 2 TD, 2 INT
Nebraska	Rushing	Trey Palmer	1 carry, 60 yards
Nebraska	Receiving	Trey Palmer	7 receptions, 237 yards, 2 TD
Purdue	Passing	Aidan O'Connell	35/54, 391 yards, 4 TD, INT
Purdue	Rushing	Devin Mockobee	30 carries, 178 yards, TD
Purdue	Receiving	Charlie Jones	12 receptions, 132 yards, 2 TD

=== vs No. 17 Illinois ===
No. 17 Illinois Fighting Illini (6–1) vs Nebraska Cornhuskers (3–4) – Game summary

Quarter	1	2	3	4	Total
No. 17 Fighting Illini	6	14	3	3	26
Cornhuskers	3	6	0	0	9

at Memorial Stadium • Lincoln, NE

- Date: October 29, 2022
- Game time: 2:30 p.m.
- Game weather: Sunny, 70 °F (21 °C)
- Game attendance: 86,691
- Referee: Greg Blum
- TV announcers (ABC): Dave Pasch (play-by-play), Dusty Dvoracek (analyst), and Tom Luginbill (sideline)
- Sources: huskers.com

Game information

First quarter

- (12:33) ILL – Isaiah Williams 46-yard pass from Tommy DeVito (Drive: 5 plays, 75 yards, 2:27; Illinois 6–0)
- (1:49) NEB – Timmy Bleekrode 26-yard field goal (Drive: 9 plays, 73 yards, 3:15; Illinois 6–3)

Second quarter

- (9:38) NEB – Travis Vokolek 56-yard pass from Casey Thompson (Drive: 5 plays, 93 yards, 2:24; Nebraska 9–6)
- (6:03) ILL – Chase Brown 1-yard run, Caleb Griffin kick (Drive: 2 plays, 11 yards, 0:28; Illinois 13–9)
- (0:23) ILL – Chase Brown 12-yard pass from Tommy DeVito, Caleb Griffin kick (Drive: 11 plays, 72 yards, 4:08; Illinois 20–9)

Third quarter

- (3:29) ILL – Caleb Griffin 36-yard field goal (Drive: 13 plays, 70 yards, 7:27; Illinois 23–9)

Fourth quarter

- (11:12) ILL – Caleb Griffin 41-yard field goal (Drive: 4 plays, 2 yards, 2:00; Illinois 26–9)

Statistics	ILL	NEB
First downs	18	9
Total yards	367	248
Rushes/yards	48–188	25–60
Passing yards	179	188
Passing: Comp–Att–Int	20–22–0	11–24–3
Time of possession	38:13	21:47

Team	Category	Player	Statistics
Illinois	Passing	Tommy DeVito	20/22, 179 yards, 2 TD
Illinois	Rushing	Chase Brown	32 carries, 149 yards, TD
Illinois	Receiving	Isaiah Williams	9 receptions, 93 yards, TD
Nebraska	Passing	Casey Thompson	7/15, 172 yards, TD, 2 INT
Nebraska	Rushing	Anthony Grant	12 carries, 61 yards
Nebraska	Receiving	Travis Vokolek	1 reception, 56 yards, TD

=== vs Minnesota ===
Minnesota Golden Gophers (5–3) vs Nebraska Cornhuskers (3–5) – Game summary

Quarter	1	2	3	4	Total
Golden Gophers	0	0	10	10	20
Cornhuskers	10	0	0	3	13

at Memorial Stadium • Lincoln, NE

- Date: November 5, 2022
- Game time: 11:00 a.m.
- Game weather: Sunny, 40 °F (4 °C)
- Game attendance: 86,284
- Referee: Mark Kluczynski
- TV announcers (ESPN2): Anish Shroff (play-by-play), Brock Osweiler (analyst), and Taylor McGregor (sideline)
- Sources: huskers.com

Game information

First quarter

- (10:46) NEB – Chubba Purdy 2-yard run, Timmy Bleekrode kick (Drive: 9 plays, 75 yards, 4:14; Nebraska 7–0)
- (4:18) NEB – Timmy Bleekrode 24-yard field goal (Drive: 11 plays, 50 yards, 4:31; Nebraska 10–0)

Second quarter

None

Third quarter

- (10:30) MINN – Matthew Trickett 47-yard field goal (Drive: 10 plays, 46 yards, 4:30; Nebraska 10–3)
- (3:20) MINN – Mohamed Ibrahim 3-yard run, Matthew Trickett kick (Drive: 6 plays, 86 yards, 3:01; Tied 10–10)

Fourth quarter

- (14:02) MINN – Matthew Trickett 49-yard field goal (Drive: 9 plays, 47 yards, 3:22; Minnesota 13–10)
- (9:22) MINN – Mohamed Ibrahim 3-yard run, Matthew Trickett kick (Drive: 7 plays, 33 yards, 3:48; Minnesota 20–10)
- (4:49) NEB – Timmy Bleekrode 26-yard field goal (Drive: 12 plays, 67 yards, 4:33; Minnesota 20–13)

Statistics	MINN	NEB
First downs	18	13
Total yards	300	267
Rushes/yards	45–125	35–146
Passing yards	175	121
Passing: Comp–Att–Int	12–20–0	11–26–1
Time of possession	34:41	25:19

Team	Category	Player	Statistics
Minnesota	Passing	Athan Kaliakmanis	6/12, 137 yards
Minnesota	Rushing	Mohamed Ibrahim	32 carries, 128 yards, 2 TD
Minnesota	Receiving	Daniel Jackson	5 receptions, 88 yards
Nebraska	Passing	Logan Smothers	5/10, 80 yards
Nebraska	Rushing	Anthony Grant	21 carries, 115 yards
Nebraska	Receiving	Marcus Washington	2 receptions, 63 yards

=== at No. 3 Michigan ===
Nebraska Cornhuskers (3–6) at No. 3 Michigan Wolverines (9–0) – Game summary

Quarter	1	2	3	4	Total
Cornhuskers	0	3	0	0	3
No. 3 Wolverines	7	10	7	10	34

at Michigan Stadium • Ann Arbor, MI

- Date: November 12, 2022
- Game time: 3:30 p.m. EST
- Game weather: Snowy, 40 °F (4 °C)
- Game attendance: 110,192
- Referee: Jerry McGinn
- TV announcers (ABC): Mark Jones (play-by-play), Robert Griffin III (analyst), and Quint Kessenich (sideline)
- Sources: huskers.com

Game information

First quarter

- (4:26) MICH – Blake Corum 2-yard run, Jake Moody kick (Drive: 12 plays, 80 yards, 6:48; Michigan 7–0)

Second quarter

- (8:46) MICH – Ronnie Bell 9-yard pass from J. J. McCarthy, Jake Moody kick (Drive: 6 plays, 66 yards, 3:24; Michigan 14–0)
- (4:10) NEB – Timmy Bleekrode 37-yard field goal (Drive: 11 plays, 56 yards, 4:36; Michigan 14–3)
- (0:01) MICH – Jake Moody 30-yard field goal (Drive: 12 plays, 55 yards, 4:09; Michigan 17–3)

Third quarter

- (0:57) MICH – J. J. McCarthy 3-yard run, Jake Moody kick (Drive: 10 plays, 65 yards, 5:58; Michigan 24–3)

Fourth quarter

- (9:39) MICH – Ronnie Bell 29-yard pass from J. J. McCarthy, recovered by Andrel Anthony, Jake Moody kick (Drive: 6 plays, 76 yards, 3:27; Michigan 31–3)
- (1:17) MICH – Jake Moody 43-yard field goal (Drive: 9 plays, 43 yards, 4:35; Michigan 34–3)

Statistics	NEB	MICH
First downs	8	27
Total yards	146	412
Rushes/yards	29–75	49–264
Passing yards	71	148
Passing: Comp–Att–Int	10–19–0	10–20–0
Time of possession	24:48	35:12

Team	Category	Player	Statistics
Nebraska	Passing	Chubba Purdy	6/11, 56 yards
Nebraska	Rushing	Chubba Purdy	5 carries, 39 yards
Nebraska	Receiving	Marcus Washington	2 receptions, 36 yards
Michigan	Passing	J. J. McCarthy	8/17, 129 yards, 2 TD
Michigan	Rushing	Blake Corum	28 carries, 162 yards, TD
Michigan	Receiving	Ronnie Bell	4 receptions, 72 yards, TD

=== vs Wisconsin ===
Wisconsin Badgers (5–5) vs Nebraska Cornhuskers (3–7) – Game summary

Quarter	1	2	3	4	Total
Badgers	0	0	3	12	15
Cornhuskers	0	7	7	0	14

at Memorial Stadium • Lincoln, NE

- Date: November 19, 2022
- Game time: 11:00 a.m.
- Game weather: Sunny, 28 °F (−2 °C)
- Game attendance: 86,068
- Referee: Reggie Smith
- TV announcers (ESPN): Mark Jones (play-by-play), Robert Griffin III (analyst), and Quint Kessenich (sideline)
- Sources: huskers.com

Game information

First quarter

None

Second quarter

- (6:40) NEB – Trey Palmer 11-yard pass from Casey Thompson, Timmy Bleekrode kick (Drive: 8 plays, 37 yards, 3:33; Nebraska 7–0)

Third quarter

- (4:50) WISC – Nate Van Zelst 25-yard field goal (Drive: 14 plays, 74 yards, 7:34; Nebraska 7–3)
- (0:34) NEB – Trey Palmer 19-yard pass from Casey Thompson, Timmy Bleekrode kick (Drive: 9 plays, 79 yards, 4:16; Nebraska 14–3)

Fourth quarter

- (10:07) WISC – Skyler Bell 10-yard pass from Graham Mertz (Drive: 10 plays, 75 yards, 5:27; Nebraska 14–9)
- (0:35) WISC – Graham Mertz 1-yard run (Drive: 7 plays, 50 yards, 2:36; Wisconsin 15–14)

Statistics	WISC	NEB
First downs	21	12
Total yards	318	171
Rushes/yards	52–235	29–65
Passing yards	83	106
Passing: Comp–Att–Int	8–18–1	12–20–0
Time of possession	36:57	23:03

Team	Category	Player	Statistics
Wisconsin	Passing	Graham Mertz	8/18, 83 yards, TD, INT
Wisconsin	Rushing	Chez Mellusi	21 carries, 98 yards
Wisconsin	Receiving	Keontez Lewis	3 receptions, 31 yards
Nebraska	Passing	Casey Thompson	12/20, 106 yards, 2 TD
Nebraska	Rushing	Casey Thompson	11 carries, 33 yards
Nebraska	Receiving	Trey Palmer	4 receptions, 47 yards, 2 TD

=== at Iowa ===
Nebraska Cornhuskers (3–8) at Iowa Hawkeyes (7–4) – Game summary

Quarter	1	2	3	4	Total
Cornhuskers	10	7	7	0	24
Hawkeyes	0	0	7	10	17

at Kinnick Stadium • Iowa City, IA

- Date: November 25, 2022
- Game time: 3:00 p.m.
- Game weather: Clear, 53 °F (12 °C)
- Game attendance: 69,250
- Referee: Ron Snodgrass
- TV announcers (BTN): Brandon Gaudin (play-by-play), Jake Butt (analyst), and Rick Pizzo (sideline)
- Sources: huskers.com

Game information

First quarter

- (8:45) NEB – Trey Palmer 87-yard pass from Casey Thompson, Timmy Bleekrode kick (Drive: 1 play, 87 yards, 0:12; Nebraska 7–0)
- (3:24) NEB – Timmy Bleekrode 21-yard field goal (Drive: 7 plays, 28 yards, 3:08; Nebraska 10–0)

Second quarter

- (10:51) NEB – Trey Palmer 18-yard pass from Casey Thompson, Timmy Bleekrode kick (Drive: 3 plays, 39 yards, 0:51; Nebraska 17–0)

Third quarter

- (12:15) NEB – Marcus Washington 14-yard pass from Casey Thompson, Timmy Bleekrode kick (Drive: 3 plays, 18 yards, 1:17; Nebraska 24–0)
- (8:32) IOWA – Kaleb Johnson 44-yard run, Drew Stevens kick (Drive: 7 plays, 75 yards, 3:43; Nebraska 24–7)

Fourth quarter

- (6:49) IOWA – Luke Lachey 14-yard pass from Alex Padilla, Drew Stevens kick (Drive: 9 plays, 90 yards, 2:45; Nebraska 24–14)
- (5:41) IOWA – Drew Stevens 45-yard field goal (Drive: 4 plays, 0 yards, 0:22; Nebraska 24–17)

Statistics	NEB	IOWA
First downs	17	18
Total yards	329	274
Rushes/yards	35–51	33–124
Passing yards	278	150
Passing: Comp–Att–Int	20–30–0	17–39–1
Time of possession	31:15	28:45

Team	Category	Player	Statistics
Nebraska	Passing	Casey Thompson	20/30, 278 yards, 3 TD
Nebraska	Rushing	Rahmir Johnson	12 carries, 52 yards
Nebraska	Receiving	Trey Palmer	9 receptions, 165 yards, 2 TD
Iowa	Passing	Alex Padilla	16/33, 141 yards, TD, INT
Iowa	Rushing	Kaleb Johnson	16 carries, 109 yards, TD
Iowa	Receiving	Luke Lachey	7 receptions, 89 yards, TD

== Big Ten awards ==
=== Player of the Week Honors ===
Weekly Awards
Player	Award	Week Awarded	Ref.
Anthony Grant	Big Ten Co-offensive Player of the Week	Week 1	
Malcolm Hartzog	Big Ten Freshman of the Week	Week 5	

=== All-Conference awards ===
2022 Big Ten Offense All-Conference Teams and Awards

Coaches All-Big Ten
Position	Player	Team
DL	Garrett Nelson	Second Team
WR	Trey Palmer	Third Team
RB	Anthony Grant	Honorable Mention
LB	Luke Reimer	Honorable Mention
DB	Quinton Newsome	Honorable Mention

Media All-Big Ten
Position	Player	Team
WR	Trey Palmer	Second Team
DL	Garrett Nelson	Second Team
RB	Anthony Grant	Honorable Mention
LB	Luke Reimer	Honorable Mention

== Rankings ==
Ranking movements Legend: ██ Increase in ranking ██ Decrease in ranking — = Not ranked RV = Received votes
	Week															
Poll	Pre	1	2	3	4	5	6	7	8	9	10	11	12	13	14	Final
AP	RV	—	—	—	—	—	—	—	—	—	—	—	—	—	—	—
Coaches	—	—	—	—	—	—	—	—	—	—	—	—	—	—	—	—
CFP	Not released									—	—	—	—	—	—	Not released

== Players drafted into the NFL ==
Round	Pick	Player	Position	NFL Club
6	189	Ochaun Mathis	DE	Los Angeles Rams
6	191	Trey Palmer	WR	Tampa Bay Buccaneers
