= Chubba Purdy =

American football player (born 2001)

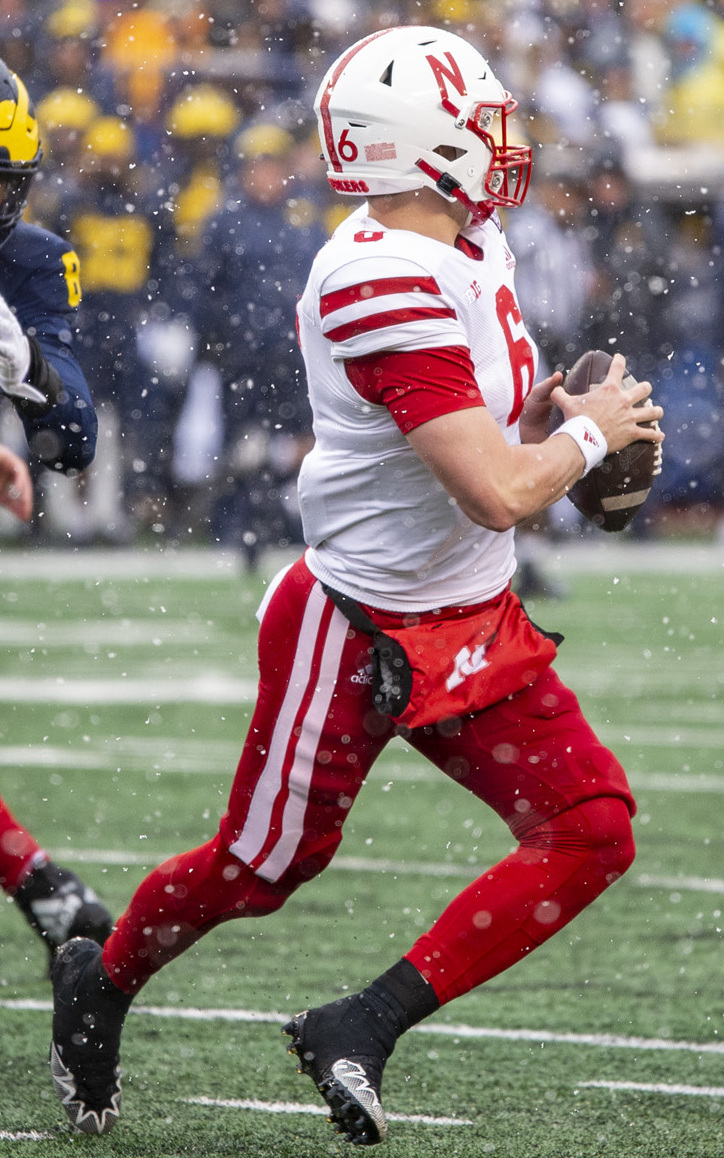
- Purdy in 2022

Personal information
- Born: July 30, 2001 (age 25); Queen Creek, Arizona, U.S.
- Listed height: 6 ft 1 in (1.85 m)
- Listed weight: 205 lb (93 kg)

Career information
- High school: Perry (Gilbert, Arizona)
- College: Florida State (2020–2021); Nebraska (2022–2023); Nevada (2024–2025)
- Stats at ESPN

Preston "Chubba" Purdy (born July 30, 2001) is an American college football quarterback. He originally committed to and played for Florida State before transferring to Nebraska and eventually the University of Nevada. He is the younger brother of San Francisco 49ers quarterback Brock Purdy.

== Early life ==
Purdy was born on July 30, 2001, in Queen Creek, Arizona. He attended and played football for Perry High School in Gilbert, Arizona. In his two years as a starter, he accounted for 9,000 yards and 111 touchdowns.

In Purdy's first two seasons, he sat behind his older brother Brock. As a junior, he threw for 3,425 yards and 36 touchdowns, while also rushing for 1,152 yards and 23 rushing touchdowns. He led Perry to an 11–3 record and a 6A state championship game appearance which ended in a 65–28 loss against Chandler.

As a senior in 2019, Purdy tallied 4,423 yards of total offense and 52 touchdowns. He was named as the Arizona Offensive Player of the Year. He helped lead Perry to the quarterfinals of the 6A state playoffs. The team would lose to Desert Vista 70–63.

College recruiting
Name	Hometown	School	Height	Weight	Commit date
Chubba Purdy; QB	Queen Creek, Arizona	Perry High School	6 ft 2 in (1.88 m)	204 lb (93 kg)	Dec 18, 2019
Chubba Purdy; QB	Recruit ratings: Scout: Rivals: 247Sports: ESPN:				
Overall recruit ranking: 247Sports: 192
Note: In many cases, Scout, Rivals, 247Sports, On3, and ESPN may conflict in their listings of height and weight.; In these cases, the average was taken. ESPN grades are on a 100-point scale.; Sources: "2020 Team Ranking". Rivals.com.

== College career ==
=== Florida State ===
On June 21, 2019, Purdy committed to play college football for Louisville but on December 18, 2019, he flipped his commitment to Florida State.

As a true freshman in 2020, Purdy appeared in three games and started once. He finished the season 27 of 53 for 219 yards and two touchdowns. He also added 57 yards rushing on nineteen attempts. He became just the fifth true freshman in Florida State history to start at quarterback. He made his college debut against Louisville, he gained eight yards on two carries. He made his first collegiate start against NC State, he went fifteen of 23 for 181 yards and two touchdowns while also adding 54 rushing yards on twelve attempts before being pulled in the second quarter for fellow freshman Tate Rodemaker. He threw his first career touchdown pass on a 69-yard throw to Ontaria Wilson. He also appeared against Pittsburgh after starter Jordan Travis left the game at halftime due to injury and after backup James Blackman struggled, he finished the game twelve of 21 for 38 yards. Purdy's 2020 season officially ended less than a week after he made his first career start, after undergoing surgery for his collarbone.

As a redshirt freshman in 2021, Purdy's only appearance was in the team's 59–3 win against UMass. He completed all five of his pass attempts for 98 yards and a career-high-tying two touchdown passes. On November 3, 2021, he entered the transfer portal.

=== Nebraska ===
On January 17, 2022, Purdy transferred to Nebraska. He made his debut for Nebraska against No. 6 Oklahoma. He led the team to one of its two touchdown drives as he went seven of eleven for 35 yards while also rushing five times for 29 yards, including an eight-yard score. He also played sparingly against Indiana and Rutgers before playing the entire second half against No. 17 Illinois. Against Illinois he completed three of eight passes for fifteen yards while injured. He made his first career start against Minnesota while starter Casey Thompson dealt with injury. In the first quarter he would account for 65 total yards of offense and a rushing touchdown for a 10-point first quarter. Purdy would start for the second consecutive week against No. 3 Michigan, finishing the game as the team's leading passer and runner despite being knocked out of the game with a season-ending ankle injury that required surgery.

Purdy entered the 2023 season third on Nebraska's quarterback depth chart behind Heinrich Haarberg and recent transfer Jeff Sims. Purdy was named the starter for Week 12 against Wisconsin after Haarberg sustained an ankle injury. Although Nebraska ultimately lost to Wisconsin 24–17 in overtime, Nebraska head coach Matt Rhule told media he "thought Chubba played really well."

On December 20, 2023, Purdy announced that he would be entering the transfer portal for the second time.

=== Nevada ===
On January 15, 2024, Purdy announced that he would transfer to San Jose State. However, San Jose State football coach Brent Brennan was hired by Arizona the next day and on January 22 Purdy announced that he would instead be committing to play football at Nevada.

On December 4, 2024, Purdy announced that he would enter the transfer portal for the third time. However, almost one week later on December 10, he announced that he would return to Nevada for the 2025 season and would withdraw from the transfer portal.

=== Statistics ===
Season	Team	Games			Passing								Rushing				Receiving			
Season	Team	GP	GS	Record (Note: Accounts for only GS as a QB. In 2025 Purdy started multiple at WR.)	Cmp	Att	Pct	Yds	Y/A	TD	Int	Rtg	Att	Yds	Avg	TD	Rec	Yds	Avg	TD
2020	Florida State	3	1	0–1	27	53	50.9	219	4.1	2	1	94.3	19	57	3.0	0				
2021	Florida State	1	0	—	5	5	100.0	98	19.6	2	0	396.6	1	5	5.0	0				
2022	Nebraska	6	2	0–2	22	48	45.8	147	3.1	0	3	59.1	24	73	3.0	2				
2023	Nebraska	6	2	0–2	31	57	54.4	382	6.7	2	3	111.7	29	180	6.2	1				
2024	Nevada	7	1	0–1	18	25	72.0	239	9.6	1	1	157.5	13	60	4.6	0	2	10	5.0	0
2025	Nevada	12	7	1–3	44	86	51.2	577	6.7	3	8	100.4	101	527	5.2	3	9	59	6.6	1
Career		35	13	1−9	147	274	53.6	1,662	6.1	10	16	105.0	187	902	4.8	6	11	69	6.3	1

== Personal life ==
Purdy is the son of Shawn and Carrie Purdy. His older brother, Brock Purdy, played quarterback for Iowa State before being drafted as Mr. Irrelevant in the 2022 NFL draft by the San Francisco 49ers of the National Football League (NFL). His older sister, Whittney, played softball for Southeastern. Purdy's father, Shawn, played baseball at the University of Miami and in the minor leagues.
