= Tommi Hill =

American football player (born 2002)

Jacksonville Sharks
- Position: Cornerback
- Roster status: Active

Personal information
- Born: March 21, 2002 (age 24); Orlando, Florida, U.S.
- Listed height: 6 ft 0 in (1.83 m)
- Listed weight: 215 lb (98 kg)

Career information
- High school: Maynard Evans (Orlando)
- College: Arizona State (2021); Nebraska (2022–2024)
- NFL draft: 2025: undrafted

Career history
- Birmingham Stallions (2025); Jacksonville Sharks (2026–present)

Tommi Hill (born March 21, 2002) is an American football cornerback for the Jacksonville Sharks of the Indoor Football League (IFL). He played college football for the Arizona State Sun Devils and Nebraska Cornhuskers.

== Early life ==
Hill was born on March 21, 2002. He grew up in Tarpon Springs, Florida; he lived with his mother and two sisters until 2015, when he moved in with his uncle after his mother was arrested for retail theft and child abuse. His father later died in a car crash in 2019.

Hill attended Maynard Evans High School in Orlando as a freshman, then transferred to Edgewater High School as a sophomore. He played three years on the football team at Edgewater as a two-way player, being a defensive back and wide receiver, helping them compile a record of 33–6 in his time there. Hill helped Edgewater reached the state championship game in 2020 and totaled 85 receptions for 1,586 yards and 14 touchdowns, along with 22 tackles and four interceptions in his last two years. He was ranked a four-star prospect, a top 200 recruit nationally and the 31st-best player in Florida by ESPN. He committed to play college football for the Arizona State Sun Devils over more than 30 other offers.

== College career ==
Hill appeared in 11 games for Arizona State in 2021, recording nine tackles. He transferred to the Nebraska Cornhuskers in 2022.

In his first year with the Cornhuskers, Hill began at cornerback before switching to wide receiver mid-season. He totaled 17 tackles and also served as a return specialist, recording 221 kickoff return yards. In 2023, he played in all 12 games, mainly on defense, and tied for the lead in the Big Ten Conference with 13 passes defended; he also recorded 26 tackles and four interceptions, being named honorable mention All-Big Ten. He returned as a senior in 2024.

=== Statistics ===
Year	Team	G	GS	Solo	Ast	Tot	Sacks	Int	PBU	PDEF	FF	FR
2021	Arizona State	11	1	7	2	9	0	0	0	0	0	0
2022	Nebraska	11	4	10	7	17	0	0	4	4	0	0
2023	Nebraska	12	8	17	9	26	0	4	9	13	0	0
2024	Nebraska	7	5	10	11	21	0	1	1	2	0	0

== Professional career ==
Pre-draft measurables
Height	Weight	Arm length	Hand span
6 ft 0 1/2 in (1.84 m)	213 lb (97 kg)	32 7/8 in (0.84 m)	9 in (0.23 m)
All values from NFL Combine

Hill was not selected in the 2025 NFL draft. The following week, he was invited to the Minnesota Vikings' rookie minicamp.

=== Birmingham Stallions ===
On May 19, 2025, Hill signed with the Birmingham Stallions of the United Football League (UFL).

=== Jacksonville Sharks ===
It was announced on September 9, 2026 that Hill had signed with the Jacksonville Sharks of the Indoor Football League (IFL).
