= Quinton Newsome =

American football player (born 2001)

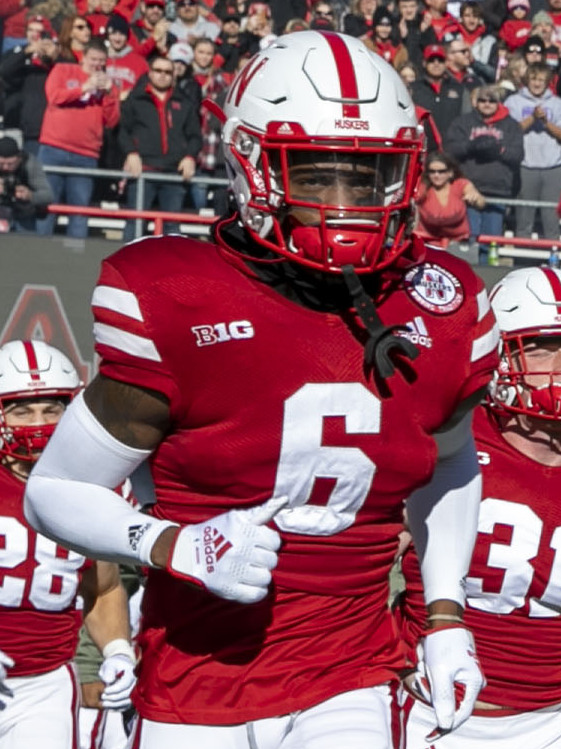
- Newsome with Nebraska in 2022

Profile
- Position: Cornerback

Personal information
- Born: July 11, 2001 (age 25); Suwanee, Georgia, U.S.
- Listed height: 6 ft 0 in (1.83 m)
- Listed weight: 185 lb (84 kg)

Career information
- High school: North Gwinnett (Suwanee)
- College: Nebraska (2019–2023)
- NFL draft: 2024: undrafted

Career history
- Denver Broncos (2024–2025)*; Houston Gamblers (2026); Arizona Cardinals (2026)*
- * Offseason or practice squad member only
- Stats at Pro Football Reference

Quinton Newsome (born July 11, 2001) is an American professional football cornerback. He played college football for the Nebraska Cornhuskers and was signed by the Denver Broncos as an undrafted free agent in 2024.

== Early life ==
Newsome attended high school at North Gwinnett. Coming out of high school, Newsome was rated as a three-star recruit where he decided to commit to play college football for the Nebraska Cornhuskers.

== College career ==
In week seven of the 2021 season against Michigan State he recorded seven tackles and a pass deflection. In Newsome's first two seasons in 2020 and 2021 he notched 66 tackles with two being for a loss, four pass deflections, and a forced fumble. During the 2022 season, Newsome posted 44 tackles, ten pass deflections, a forced fumble, and a fumble recovery. In week six of the 2023 season, Newsome recorded his first career interception off quarterback Luke Altmyer which he returned for 39 yards as he finished the game with the pick and five tackles. In week nine, Newsome recovered two fumbles, and returned a blocked field goal 68 yards for a touchdowns, as he helped the Cornhuskers beat Purdue. For his performance against the Boilermakers, Newsome was named the Big-Ten special teams player of the week. During the 2023 season, Newsome tallied 37 tackles, with one going for a loss, three pass deflections, an interception, and a fumble recovery. After the conclusion of the 2023 season, Newsome declared for the 2024 NFL draft.

=== Statistics ===
Year	Team	G	GS	Solo	Ast	Tot	Sacks	Int	PD	FF	FR
2019	Nebraska	10	0	0	0	0	0	0	0	0	0
2020	Nebraska	8	1	9	1	10	0	0	0	1	0
2021	Nebraska	12	12	38	19	57	1	0	4	0	0
2022	Nebraska	12	12	27	17	44	2	0	10	1	1
2023	Nebraska	11	10	20	17	37	0	1	4	0	1

== Professional career ==
Pre-draft measurables
Height	Weight	Arm length	Hand span	Wingspan	40-yard dash	10-yard split	20-yard split	20-yard shuttle	Three-cone drill	Vertical jump	Broad jump
6 ft 0 1/8 in (1.83 m)	185 lb (84 kg)	30 5/8 in (0.78 m)	8 3/8 in (0.21 m)	6 ft 2 7/8 in (1.90 m)	4.58 s	1.50 s	2.66 s	4.28 s	7.11 s	37.0 in (0.94 m)	10 ft 9 in (3.28 m)
All values from Pro Day

=== Denver Broncos ===
Newsome signed with the Denver Broncos as an undrafted free agent on May 13, 2024. On August 27, Newsome was waived by the Broncos. The next day, he was re-signed to the Broncos' practice squad. On October 8, Newsome was released by the Broncos. On October 14, Newsome signed to the Broncos' practice squad again. He signed a reserve/future contract on January 13, 2025.

On August 26, 2025, Newsome was waived by the Broncos. The next day, he was re-signed to the practice squad. On September 2, Newsome was released from the practice squad.

=== Houston Gamblers ===
On January 13, 2026, Newsome was selected by the Houston Gamblers in the 2026 UFL Draft.

=== Arizona Cardinals ===
On July 31, 2026, Newsome signed with the Arizona Cardinals. He was waived by the Cardinals on August 30.
