= Heinrich Haarberg =

American football player (born 2003)

Dallas Renegades
- Position: Tight end
- Roster status: Unsigned draft pick

Personal information
- Born: March 15, 2003 (age 23)
- Listed height: 6 ft 4 in (1.93 m)
- Listed weight: 237 lb (108 kg)

Career information
- High school: Kearney Catholic (Kearney, Nebraska)
- College: Nebraska (2021–2025)
- NFL draft: 2026: undrafted

Career history
- Carolina Panthers (2026)*; Dallas Renegades (2027–present)
- * Offseason or practice squad member only

Heinrich Haarberg (born March 15, 2003) is an American professional football tight end. He played college football for the Nebraska Cornhuskers as a quarterback and tight end.

== Early life ==
Haarberg grew up in Kearney, Nebraska and attended Kearney Catholic High School. As a senior, he passed for 1,857 yards and 19 touchdowns and also rushed for 556 yards and 10 touchdowns. Haarberg was rated a three-star recruit and committed to play college football at Nebraska over offers from Boston College, Vanderbilt, and NC State. He became the first in-state quarterback to sign a National Letter of Intent to play at Nebraska since 2001.

== College career ==
Haarberg joined the Nebraska Cornhuskers as an early enrollee in January 2021. He did not play in any games and redshirted his true freshman season in 2021. Haarberg also did not see any playing time as a redshirt freshman in 2022.

During 2023 spring practices, he began playing tight end in addition to quarterback. Haarberg made his collegiate debut in the 2023 season opener against Minnesota, lining up at tight end and catching one pass for ten yards. The following game against Colorado, he played the final 15 offensive snaps at quarterback following an injury to starter Jeff Sims and completed 2-of-6 pass attempts for 13 yards and a touchdown and rushed for 17 yards in a 36-14 loss. Haarberg was named the starter in place of Sims for the following game against Northern Illinois. In his first career start he completed 14 of 24 passes for 158 yards and two touchdowns while also leading the Cornhuskers with 98 rushing yards and scoring another touchdown on 21 carries in a 35-11 win. Haarberg remained the starter for most the rest of the 2023 season, accumulating 967 passing yards, 477 rushing yards, 5 rushing touchdowns, 7 passing touchdowns, and 7 interceptions.

For the 2024 season, Haarberg remained with the Huskers but the starting quarterback position was given to true freshman Dylan Raiola; Haarberg was announced as the primary backup quarterback but would also be a utility player featured in various packages and formations alongside Raiola, with his role being described as similar to the use of Taysom Hill by the New Orleans Saints. Late in 2024, it was announced that Haarberg had officially changed position to tight end.

=== Statistics ===
Season	Team	Games			Passing								Rushing				Receiving			
Season	Team	GP	GS	Record (Note: Accounts for only GS as a QB. In 2024, Haarberg started at TE.)	Cmp	Att	Pct	Yds	Y/A	TD	Int	Rtg	Att	Yds	Avg	TD	Rec	Yds	Avg	TD
2021	Nebraska	Redshirt (redshirt)																		
2022	Nebraska	DNP																		
2023	Nebraska	10	8	5–3	77	157	49.0	967	6.2	7	7	106.6	120	477	4.0	5	2	12	6.0	0
2024	Nebraska	12	1	—	10	18	55.6	101	5.6	0	1	91.6	25	102	4.1	1	2	16	8.0	0
2025	Nebraska	8	0	—	Did not record pass attempt								6	5	0.8	0	7	51	7.3	1
Career		30	9	5–3	87	175	49.7	1,068	6.1	7	8	105.0	151	584	3.9	6	11	79	7.2	1

== Professional career ==
Pre-draft measurables
Height	Weight	Arm length	Hand span	Wingspan	40-yard dash	10-yard split	20-yard split	20-yard shuttle	Three-cone drill	Vertical jump	Broad jump	Bench press
6 ft 4 1/4 in (1.94 m)	237 lb (108 kg)	31 1/4 in (0.79 m)	10 1/8 in (0.26 m)	6 ft 4 in (1.93 m)	4.56 s	1.62 s	2.59 s	4.21 s	6.95 s	38.0 in (0.97 m)	10 ft 8 in (3.25 m)	18 reps
All values from Pro Day

After going undrafted in the 2026 NFL draft, Haarberg signed with the Carolina Panthers on May 20, 2026, as a tight end. He was waived by the Panthers on June 8 and had tryouts with the Pittsburgh Steelers and Indianapolis Colts in late July and early August 2026, respectively. On November 19, 2026, Haarberg was drafted in the 15th round (113th overall) in the 2027 UFL draft by the Dallas Renegades.

== Personal life ==
Haarberg's father, Rod, played football at Nebraska as a fullback. His mother, Liz, ran track at Oklahoma State.
