= Kearney Catholic High School =

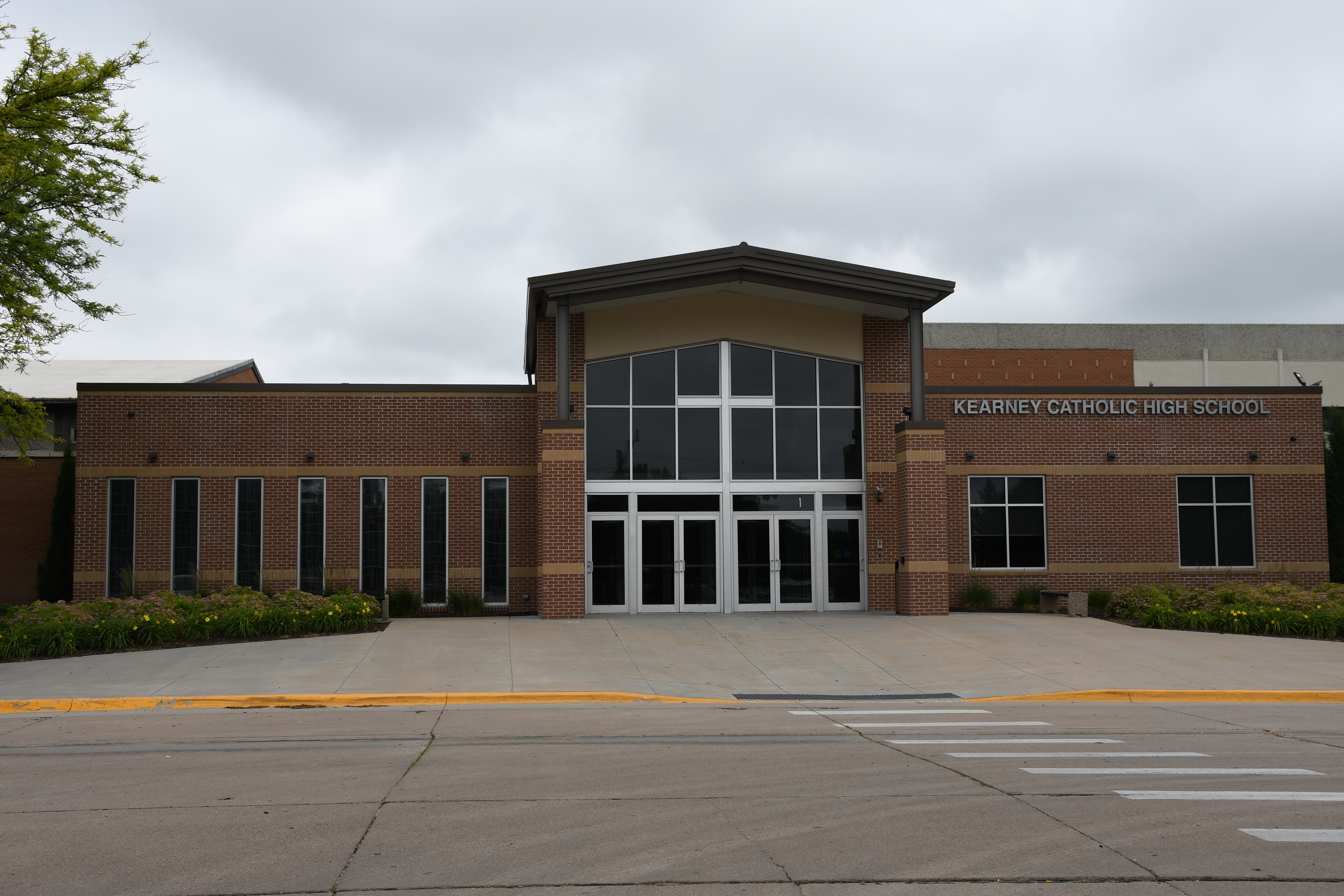

Location
- 110 East 35th Street; Kearney, (Buffalo County), Nebraska 68869; United States; 40°42′38″N 99°4′45″W

Information
- Type: Private, coeducational
- Religious affiliation: Roman Catholic
- Established: 1961
- Principal: Matthew Rogers
- Grades: 6–12
- Colors: Green and gold
- Team name: Stars
- Accreditation: North Central Association of Colleges and Schools
- Website: http://www.kearneycatholic.org

Kearney Catholic High School is a private, Roman Catholic high school in Kearney, Nebraska, United States. It is located in the Roman Catholic Diocese of Grand Island.

== Background ==
Kearney Catholic High School was founded in 1961, as the first Catholic high school in Kearney. The school was dedicated by Bishop John Paschang on October 18, 1961, at first offering grades 7–10. A grade was added each year following, with the first graduating class of 1964 consisting of 22 students. The school now offers classes in grades 6 to 12 and is a member of the Centennial Conference after leaving the Louplatte Conference in 2018. The school is accredited by the North Central Association of Colleges and Schools.

Financial support for the school comes from tuition, support from the St. James and Prince of Peace parishes, and the Kearney Catholic Foundation.

NSAA enrollment figures for grades 9-11 (used for activity classification):

| School year | 9-11 enrollment | Class avg. |
|---|---|---|
| 2001-2002 | 140 | 46.7 |
| 2002-2003 | 150 | 50 |
| 2003-2004 | 140 | 46.7 |
| 2004-2005 | 125 | 41.7 |
| 2005-2006 | 110 | 36.7 |
| 2006-2007 | 128 | 42.7 |
| 2007-2008 | 123 | 41 |
| 2008-2009 | 128 | 42.7 |
| 2009-2010 | 122 | 40.7 |
| 2010-2011 | 129 | 43 |
| 2011-2012 | 145 | 48.3 |
| 2012-2013 | 140 | 46.7 |
| 2013-2014 | 148 | 49.3 |
| 2014-2015 | 149 | 49.7 |
| 2015-2016 | 161 | 53.7 |
| 2016-2017 | 146 | 48.7 |
| 2017-2018 | 140 | 46.7 |
| 2018-2019 | 153 | 51 |
| 2019-2020 | 165 | 55 |

== Extracurricular activities ==
=== Athletics ===
Kearney Catholic athletic programs compete as a member of the Nebraska School Activities Association. Their mascot is the Stars. Various athletic programs have won the following NSAA state championships:

- Boys' football - none (runner-up - 2011)
- Girls' golf - 2008
- Boys' basketball - 2004
- Boys' cross country - 1998, 1999
- Girls' cross country - 2023
- Boys' track and field - 1986
- Girls' basketball - 1984, 1985, 2007, 2016 (runner-up - 2002, 2013, 2015, 2017)
- Girls' volleyball - 2012, 2013, 2014, 2015 (runner-up - 1985, 2010, 2011, 2023)
- Girls' tennis - 1978, 1979
- Girls' track and field - 1999, 2013, 2024, 2025
- Girls' cheerleading (runner-up - 2011)
- Boys' golf - 2023, 2024, 2025

Athletes competing in Baseball and Swimming and Diving compete in a co-op agreement with Kearney High School.
