= Ernest Hausmann =

American football player (born 2003)

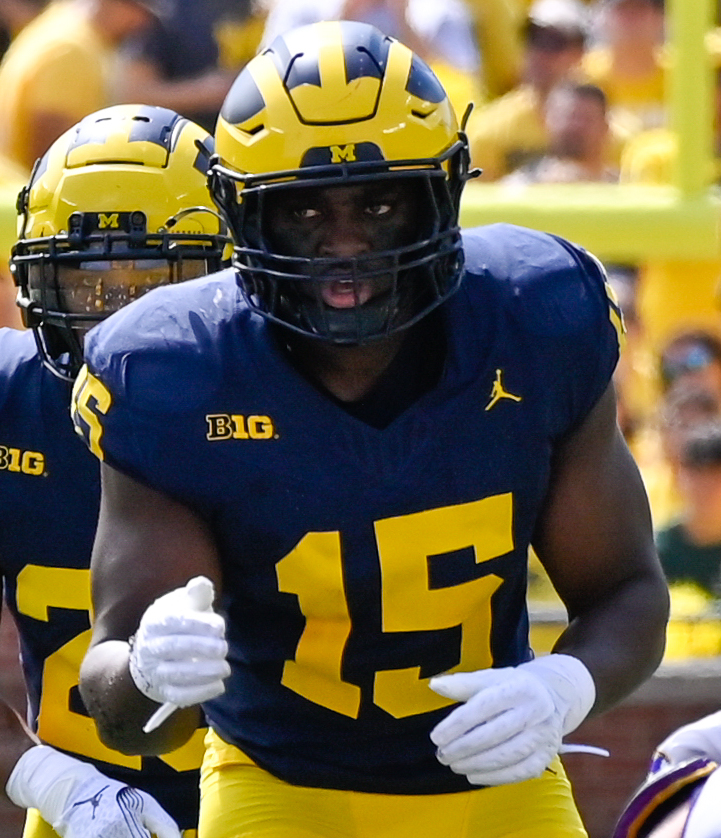
- Hausmann with the Michigan Wolverines in 2023

No. 15
- Position: Linebacker

Personal information
- Born: August 20, 2003 (age 23); Uganda
- Listed height: 6 ft 2 in (1.88 m)
- Listed weight: 235 lb (107 kg)

Career information
- High school: Columbus (Columbus, Nebraska, U.S.)
- College: Nebraska (2022); Michigan (2023–2025)

Awards and highlights
- CFP national champion (2023); Third-team All-Big Ten (2025)
- Stats at ESPN

Ernest Hausmann (born August 20, 2003) is a Ugandan former college football linebacker. He played for the Nebraska Cornhuskers in 2022, before transferring to play for the Michigan Wolverines from 2023 to 2025. In his first season with Michigan, he won a national championship.

== Early life ==
Hausmann was born in Uganda on August 20, 2003. His parents, Olive and Paul, were poor and had between 12 and 15 children. They decided to allow an American couple, Robert and Teresa Hausmann, to adopt Ernest. After a two-year adoption and immigration process, Ernest joined the Hausmanns in Nebraska at age five in 2008.

Hausmann grew up in Columbus, Nebraska, and attended Columbus High School. He played football on both offense, as a wide receiver, and on defense as a cornerback and linebacker. As a senior, he tallied 80 tackles and had 600 yards receiving with nine touchdowns. Hausmann was rated as a four star recruit, #294 overall, and the second best player in Nebraska by On3.com.

== College career ==
=== Nebraska ===
Hausmann received a scholarship offer from Nebraska in November 2020. He signed his commitment to Nebraska in December 2021.

Hausmann enrolled early at the University of Nebraska–Lincoln in January 2022 and received significant playing time as a true freshman for the team. He appeared in every game for Nebraska, including seven games as a starter. Against Michigan on November 12, he registered 10 tackles and his first college sack to push the Wolverines out of field goal range in the third quarter. The following week, on November 19, he had a career-high 12 tackles against Wisconsin. After the 2022 season, Hausmann entered the NCAA transfer portal where he was rated by 247Sports as the top player in the portal.

=== Michigan ===
==== 2023 ====
In late December 2022, Hausmann transferred to the University of Michigan. In his first season with the Wolverines, Hausmann appeared in all 15 games and won a national championship. Hausmann finished third on the team in tackles with 46, contributing at linebacker and on special teams. Hausmann earned Defensive Player of the Week in the Big Ten Championship game versus Iowa, after an 8 tackle performance.

==== 2024 ====
In 2024, Hausmann became a starting linebacker in his second season with Michigan. In week three versus Arkansas State, Hausmann led the team with seven tackles and recorded his first sack of the season. In week six versus Washington, Hausmann led the team with twelve tackles and recorded his first collegiate interception on a pass thrown by Will Rogers. He was an All-Big Ten honorable mention as a junior. In total, Hausmann started all 13 games for the Wolverines and led the team with 89 total tackles. He also had seven tackles for a loss, two sacks and an interception.

==== 2025 ====
In 2025, Hausmann was a third-team All-Big Ten selection. He missed the last three games of the season, before medically retiring after the year.

== See also ==
- Ugandan Americans
