= Omar Brown (safety) =

American football player (born 2000)

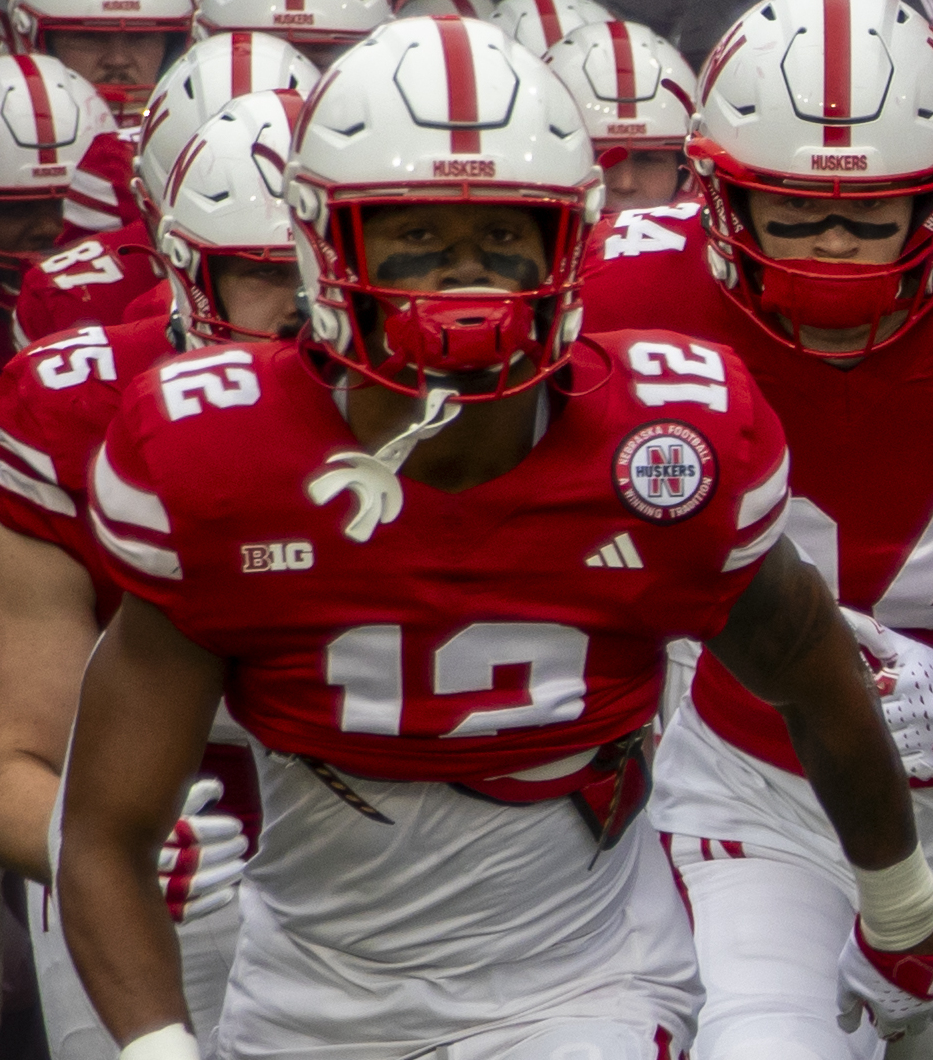
- Brown with Nebraska in 2023

Profile
- Position: Safety

Personal information
- Born: October 12, 2000 (age 26); Minneapolis, Minnesota, U.S.
- Listed height: 6 ft 1 in (1.85 m)
- Listed weight: 205 lb (93 kg)

Career information
- High school: Minneapolis North
- College: Northern Iowa (2019–2021); Nebraska (2022–2023)
- NFL draft: 2024: undrafted

Career history
- Denver Broncos (2024)*; Green Bay Packers (2024–2025); Miami Dolphins (2026)*
- * Offseason or practice squad member only

Awards and highlights
- 2× First-team All-MVFC (2019, 2021)

Career NFL statistics as of 2025
- Games played: 2
- Stats at Pro Football Reference

Omar Brown (born October 10, 2000) is an American professional football safety. He played college football for the Northern Iowa Panthers and Nebraska Cornhuskers and was signed by the Denver Broncos as an undrafted free agent in 2024. He has also played for the Green Bay Packers.

== Early life ==
Brown attended Minneapolis North High School in Minneapolis, Minnesota, and committed to play college football for the Northern Iowa Panthers.

== College career ==
=== Northern Iowa ===
In three years with the Panthers from 2019 to 2021, Brown appeared in 29 games, starting in all of them, where he notched 140 tackles and eight interceptions. He racked up multiple accolades, being named the 2019 FCS Defensive Freshman of the Year and an FCS All-American. After the conclusion of the 2021 season, Brown entered his name into the NCAA transfer portal.

=== Nebraska ===
Brown transferred to play for the Nebraska Cornhuskers. In two years at Nebraska in 2022 and 2023, he appeared in 23 games, where he totaled 56 tackles, three pass deflections, an interception, a fumble recovery, and two forced fumbles.

== Professional career ==
Pre-draft measurables
Height	Weight	Arm length	Hand span	Wingspan	40-yard dash	10-yard split	20-yard split	20-yard shuttle	Three-cone drill	Vertical jump	Broad jump	Bench press
6 ft 0 3/4 in (1.85 m)	205 lb (93 kg)	31 3/8 in (0.80 m)	9 1/4 in (0.23 m)	6 ft 4 7/8 in (1.95 m)	4.56 s	1.53 s	2.69 s	4.38 s	6.97 s	35.0 in (0.89 m)	10 ft 0 in (3.05 m)	11 reps
All values from Pro Day

=== Denver Broncos ===
After going unselected in the 2024 NFL draft, Brown signed with the Denver Broncos as an undrafted free agent. He was also drafted in the 10th and final round (76th overall) of the 2024 UFL draft by the DC Defenders. On August 26, 2024, he was waived by the Broncos.

=== Green Bay Packers ===
On August 29, 2024, Brown signed to the Green Bay Packers' practice squad. On December 23, he was elevated from the Packers' practice squad ahead of their week 16 matchup against the New Orleans Saints. Brown made his NFL debut later that same day, playing 14 total snaps in the 34–0 shutout victory. He was elevated again the next two weeks.

Brown signed a reserve/future contract with Green Bay on January 13, 2025. On August 26, 2025, he was placed on injured reserve; he was later released on September 5.

=== Miami Dolphins ===
On January 13, 2026, Brown signed a reserve/futures contract with the Miami Dolphins. On August 12, Brown was waived with an injury settlement.
