= Luke Reimer (American football) =

American football linebacker (born 2000)

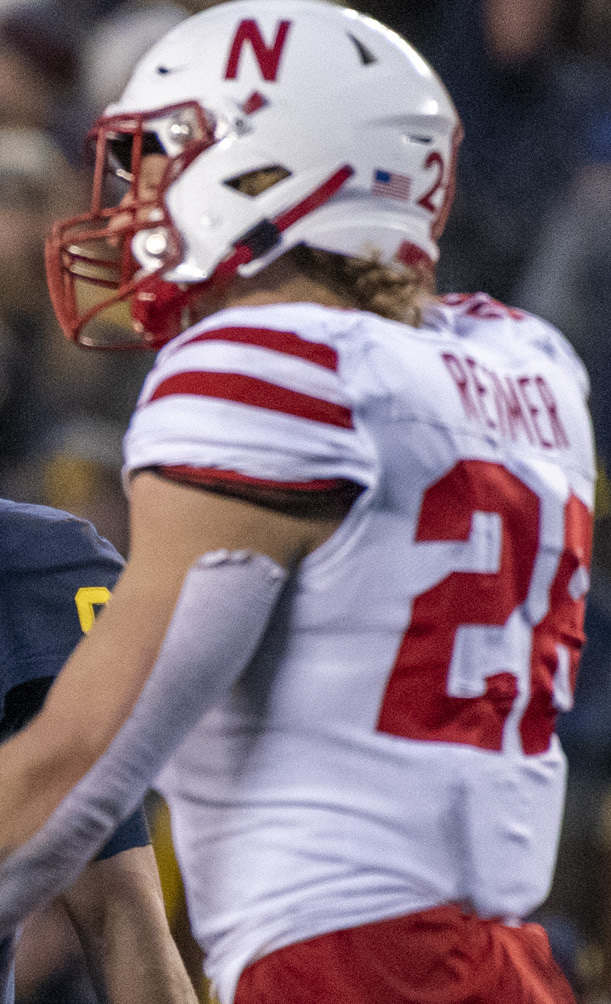
- Reimer with Nebraska in 2022

No. 4
- Position: Linebacker

Personal information
- Born: May 2, 2000 (age 26); Ashland, Kansas, U.S.
- Listed height: 6 ft 1 in (1.85 m)
- Listed weight: 225 lb (102 kg)

Career information
- High school: Lincoln North Star (Lincoln, Nebraska)
- College: Nebraska (2019–2023)

Awards and highlights
- Third-team All-Big Ten (2023)
- Stats at ESPN

Luke Reimer (born May 2, 2000) is an American professional football linebacker. He played college football for the Nebraska Cornhuskers.

== Early life ==
Reimer attended and played high school football at Lincoln North Star High School. As a senior, he had 397 rushing yards and 167 receiving yards, notching nine total touchdowns. Coming out of high school, Reimer committed to play college football for the Nebraska Cornhuskers.

== College career ==
Reimer made his collegiate debut in week two of the 2019 season, recovering a fumble versus Colorado. He finished the season with 11 tackles with one being for a loss and a fumble recovery. In week 2 of the 2020 season, Reimer tallied ten tackles and a sack against Northwestern. He finished the 2020 season tallying 40 tackles with five going for a loss, two sacks, and a forced fumble. In 2021, Reimer totaled 109 tackles with six being for a loss, a sack, six pass deflections, an interception, and three forced fumbles. In 2022 he notched 86 tackles with three and a half going for a loss, a sack, five pass deflections, and an interception. In week eight of the 2023 season, Reimer made six tackles and a sack in a win over Northwestern. Reimer finished the 2023 season with 48 tackles with seven and a being for a loss, and five sacks, earning third-team all-Big Ten honors.

== Professional career ==
Pre-draft measurables
Height	Weight	Arm length	Hand span	40-yard dash	10-yard split	20-yard split	20-yard shuttle	Three-cone drill	Vertical jump	Broad jump	Bench press
6 ft 0 1/8 in (1.83 m)	223 lb (101 kg)	30 5/8 in (0.78 m)	10 in (0.25 m)	4.71 s	1.60 s	2.70 s	4.34 s	7.20 s	38.0 in (0.97 m)	10 ft 3 in (3.12 m)	16 reps
All values from Pro Day
