= Nebraska Cornhuskers football yearly statistical leaders =

This list of Nebraska Cornhuskers football yearly statistical leaders shows the yearly individual passing, rushing, and receiving leaders of the Nebraska Cornhuskers football program. Nebraska began competing in intercollegiate football in 1890, but early records are often incomplete and inconsistent as they were reported and compiled by various newspapers or wire services, which often contradicted each other. The university generally excludes records prior to 1946. When available, this list includes statistical records from 1946 until the present day.

The NCAA did not include bowl game statistics in official records until 2002. For consistency, statistics from bowl games prior to 2002 are not included in these lists.

== Passing ==
Led country	Led conference	Program record

Year	Passing yards		Passing touchdowns	
Records prior to 1945 are inconsistent or incomplete
1946	Sam Vacanti	291	Sam Vacanti	5
1947	Del Wiegand	176	Not available (Note: Scoring statistics unavailable for several years in the 1940s and 1950s.)	
1948	Kenny Fischer	296	Not available	
1949	Fran Nagle	592	Not available	
1950	Fran Nagle	697	Fran Nagle	9
1951	John Bordogna	431	John Bordogna	4
1952	John Bordogna	532	Three tied	1
1953	John Bordogna	655	Bordogna / Fischer	1
1954	Don Erway	329	Don Erway	4
1955	Don Erway	312	Erway / Harshman	1
1956	Roy Stinnett	171	William Greenlaw	2
1957	Roy Stinnett	140	Larry Naviaux	1
1958	George Harshman	201	Harshman / Naviaux	2
1959	Harry Tolly	200	Harry Tolly	4
1960	Pat Fischer	161	Pat Fischer	1
1961	Dennis Claridge	464	Dennis Claridge	3
1962	Dennis Claridge	829	Dennis Claridge	4
1963	Dennis Claridge	440	Claridge / Woods	1
1964	Bob Churchich	893	Bob Churchich	7
1965	Fred Duda	632	Fred Duda	6
1966	Bob Churchich	1,136	Bob Churchich	4
1967	Frank Patrick	1,449	Frank Patrick	7
1968	Ernie Sigler	907	Ernie Sigler	5
1969	Jerry Tagge	1,302	Van Brownson	4
1970	Jerry Tagge	1,383	Jerry Tagge	12
1971	Jerry Tagge	2,019	Jerry Tagge	17
1972	David Humm	2,074	David Humm	17
1973	David Humm	1,526	David Humm	12
1974	David Humm	1,435	David Humm	12
1975	Vince Ferragamo	1,153	Vince Ferragamo	12
1976	Vince Ferragamo	2,071	Vince Ferragamo	20
1977	Randy Garcia	568	Randy Garcia	3
1978	Tom Sorley	1,571	Tom Sorley	12
1979	Tim Hager	680	Tim Hager	6
1980	Jeff Quinn	1,337	Jeff Quinn	14
1981	Turner Gill	619	Turner Gill	9
1982	Turner Gill	1,182	Turner Gill	11
1983	Turner Gill	1,516	Turner Gill	14
1984	Craig Sundberg	740	Sundberg / Turner	4
1985	McCathorn Clayton	602	Clayton / Turner	3
1986	Steve Taylor	808	Steve Taylor	6
1987	Steve Taylor	902	Steve Taylor	13
1988	Steve Taylor	1,067	Steve Taylor	11
1989	Gerry Gdowski	1,326	Gerry Gdowski	19
1990	Mickey Joseph	624	Mickey Joseph	11
1991	Keithen McCant	1,454	Keithen McCant	13
1992	Tommie Frazier	727	Tommie Frazier	10
1993	Tommie Frazier	1,159	Tommie Frazier	12
1994	Brook Berringer	1,295	Brook Berringer	10
1995	Tommie Frazier	1,362	Tommie Frazier	17
1996	Scott Frost	1,440	Scott Frost	13
1997	Scott Frost	1,237	Scott Frost	5
1998	Bobby Newcombe	712	Eric Crouch	4
1999	Eric Crouch	1,269	Eric Crouch	7
2000	Eric Crouch	1,101	Eric Crouch	11
2001	Eric Crouch	1,510	Eric Crouch	7
2002	Jammal Lord	1,362	Jammal Lord	12
2003	Jammal Lord	1,305	Jammal Lord	6
2004	Joe Dailey	2,025	Joe Dailey	17
2005	Zac Taylor	2,653	Zac Taylor	19
2006	Zac Taylor	3,197	Zac Taylor	26
2007	Sam Keller	2,422	Joe Ganz	16
2008	Joe Ganz	3,568	Joe Ganz	25
2009	Zac Lee	2,143	Zac Lee	14
2010	Taylor Martinez	1,631	Taylor Martinez	10
2011	Taylor Martinez	2,089	Taylor Martinez	13
2012	Taylor Martinez	2,871	Taylor Martinez	23
2013	Tommy Armstrong	966	Taylor Martinez	10
2014	Tommy Armstrong	2,695	Tommy Armstrong	22
2015	Tommy Armstrong	3,030	Tommy Armstrong	22
2016	Tommy Armstrong	2,180	Tommy Armstrong	14
2017	Tanner Lee	3,143	Tanner Lee	23
2018	Adrian Martinez	2,617	Adrian Martinez	17
2019	Adrian Martinez	1,956	Adrian Martinez	10
2020	Adrian Martinez	1,055	Adrian Martinez	4
2021	Adrian Martinez	2,863	Adrian Martinez	14
2022	Casey Thompson	2,407	Casey Thompson	17
2023	Heinrich Haarberg	967	Heinrich Haarberg	7
2024	Dylan Raiola	2,819	Dylan Raiola	13
2025	Dylan Raiola	2,000	Dylan Raiola	18

== Rushing ==
Led country	Led conference	Program record

Year	Rushing yards		Rushing touchdowns	
Records prior to 1945 are inconsistent or incomplete
1946	Dick Hutton	392	Not available	
1947	Dale Adams	249	Not available	
1948	Cletus Fischer	308	Not available	
1949	Bill Mueller	559	Fran Nagle	3
1950	Bobby Reynolds	1,342	Bobby Reynolds	19
1951	Bobby Reynolds	424	Not available	
1952	John Bordogna	576	John Bordogna	8
1953	Bob Smith	704	John Bordogna	6
1954	William Greenlaw	427	Dennis Korinek	4
1955	Rex Fischer	599	Don Erway	6
1956	Jerry Brown	690	Jerry Brown	5
1957	Jerry Brown	398	Roy Stinnett	3
1958	Larry Naviaux	261	Not available	
1959	Carroll Zaruba	463	Not available	
1960	Bill Thornton	422	Pat Fischer	5
1961	Bill Thornton	618	Bill Thornton	5
1962	Willie Ross	431	Dennis Claridge	10
1963	Rudy Johnson	573	Rudy Johnson	7
1964	Frank Solich	444	Kent McCloughan	8
1965	Harry Wilson	672	Charlie Winters	7
1966	Harry Wilson	635	Ben Gregory	6
1967	Dick Davis	717	Frank Patrick	3
1968	Joe Orduna	677	Joe Orduna	10
1969	Jeff Kinney	546	Jeff Kinney	9
1970	Joe Orduna	834	Joe Orduna	14
1971	Jeff Kinney	1,037	Jeff Kinney	16
1972	Gary Dixon	508	Gary Dixon	8
1973	Tony Davis	1,008	Tony Davis	12
1974	Monte Anthony	587	Monte Anthony	6
1975	Monte Anthony	723	Anthony / O'Leary	7
1976	Rick Berns	854	Rick Berns	9
1977	I. M. Hipp	1,301	I. M. Hipp	10
1978	I. M. Hipp	936	Rick Berns	10
1979	Jarvis Redwine	1,042	Jarvis Redwine	8
1980	Jarvis Redwine	1,119	Roger Craig	15
1981	Roger Craig	1,060	Phil Bates	7
1982	Mike Rozier	1,689	Mike Rozier	15
1983	Mike Rozier	2,148	Mike Rozier	29
1984	Doug DuBose	1,040	Travis Turner	10
1985	Doug DuBose	1,161	DuBose / Rathman	8
1986	Keith Jones	830	Keith Jones	14
1987	Keith Jones	1,232	Keith Jones	13
1988	Ken Clark	1,497	Steve Taylor	13
1989	Ken Clark	1,196	Gerry Gdowski	13
1990	Leodis Flowers	940	Mickey Joseph	10
1991	Derek Brown	1,313	Brown / Jones	14
1992	Calvin Jones	1,210	Calvin Jones	14
1993	Calvin Jones	1,043	Calvin Jones	12
1994	Lawrence Phillips	1,722	Lawrence Phillips	16
1995	Ahman Green	1,086	Tommie Frazier	14
1996	Ahman Green	917	DeAngelo Evans	14
1997	Ahman Green	1,877	Ahman Green	22
1998	Correll Buckhalter	799	Buckhalter / Newcombe	8
1999	Eric Crouch	889	Eric Crouch	16
2000	Dan Alexander	1,154	Eric Crouch	20
2001	Dahrran Diedrick	1,299	Eric Crouch	18
2002	Jammal Lord	1,412	Jammal Lord	8
2003	Jammal Lord	948	Jammal Lord	10
2004	Cory Ross	1,102	Jackson / Ross	6
2005	Cory Ross	882	Cory Ross	5
2006	Brandon Jackson	989	Glenn / Jackson	8
2007	Marlon Lucky	1,019	Marlon Lucky	9
2008	Roy Helu	803	Helu / Lucky	7
2009	Roy Helu	1,147	Roy Helu	10
2010	Roy Helu	1,245	Taylor Martinez	12
2011	Rex Burkhead	1,357	Rex Burkhead	15
2012	Ameer Abdullah	1,137	Taylor Martinez	10
2013	Ameer Abdullah	1,690	Imani Cross	10
2014	Ameer Abdullah	1,611	Ameer Abdullah	19
2015	Terrell Newby	765	Tommy Armstrong	7
2016	Terrell Newby	879	Tommy Armstrong	8
2017	Devine Ozigbo	493	Mikhale Wilbon	6
2018	Devine Ozigbo	1,082	Devine Ozigbo	12
2019	Dedrick Mills	745	Dedrick Mills	10
2020	Adrian Martinez	521	Adrian Martinez	7
2021	Adrian Martinez	525	Adrian Martinez	13
2022	Anthony Grant	915	Anthony Grant	6
2023	Heinrich Haarberg	477	Heinrich Haarberg	5
2024	Dante Dowdell	614	Dante Dowdell	12
2025	Emmett Johnson	1,451	Emmett Johnson	12

== Receiving ==
Led country	Led conference	Program record

Year	Receptions		Receiving yards		Receiving touchdowns	
Records prior to 1945 are inconsistent or incomplete
1946	William Moomey	8	Dick Hutton	228	Not available	
1947	Cochrane / Damkroger	6	Alex Cochrane	120	Not available	
1948	Dick Hutton	15	Dick Hutton	231	Not available	
1949	Frank Simon	7	Frank Simon	221	Not available	
1950	Frank Simon	12	Frank Simon	200	Bobby Reynolds	3
1951	Frank Simon	21	Frank Simon	339	Ray Novak	3
1952	Andy Loehr	8	Andy Loehr	206	Three tied	1
1953	Andy Loehr	16	Bill Schabacker	193	Korinek / Smith	1
1954	Loehr / Rolston	6	LeRoy Butherus	112	Seven tied	1
1955	Jon McWilliams	14	Jon McWilliams	239	Jon McWilliams	2
1956	Frank Nappi	13	Frank Nappi	139	Frank Nappi	2
1957	Douglas Thomas	6	Clarence Cook	80	Douglas Thomas	1
1958	Pat Fischer	7	Clay White	137	Four tied	1
1959	Clay White	7	Roger Brede	66	Carroll Zaruba	2
1960	Clay White	6	Clay White	72	Bennie Dillard	1
1961	Richard McDaniel	14	Donald Purcell	173	Three tied	1
1962	James Huge	11	James Huge	208	Six tied	1
1963	Jeter / Tomlinson	9	Richard Callahan	157	Jeter / Love	1
1964	Tony Jeter	18	Freeman White	338	Kent McCloughan	4
1965	Freeman White	28	Freeman White	458	Freeman White	6
1966	Tom Penney	24	Tom Penney	286	Dennis Morrison	2
1967	Dennis Richnafsky	36	Dennis Richnafsky	422	Dennis Richnafsky	3
1968	Tom Penney	25	Tom Penney	424	Jim McFarland	4
1969	Jeff Kinney	41	Jeff Kinney	433	Guy Ingles	3
1970	Johnny Rodgers	35	Johnny Rodgers	665	Guy Ingles	8
1971	Johnny Rodgers	53	Johnny Rodgers	872	Johnny Rodgers	11
1972	Johnny Rodgers	55	Johnny Rodgers	942	Johnny Rodgers	8
1973	Ritch Bahe	30	Frosty Anderson	504	Frosty Anderson	8
1974	Don Westbrook	33	Don Westbrook	508	Don Westbrook	7
1975	Bobby Thomas	24	Bobby Thomas	501	Bobby Thomas	7
1976	Three tied	30	Chuck Malito	615	Bobby Thomas	7
1977	Spaeth / Smith	23	Tim Smith	371	Ken Spaeth	2
1978	Junior Miller	30	Junior Miller	560	Junior Miller	5
1979	Tim Smith	30	Tim Smith	477	Junior Miller	7
1980	Todd Brown	28	Todd Brown	416	Todd Brown	5
1981	Jamie Williams	22	Jamie Williams	282	Jamie Williams	4
1982	Irving Fryar	24	Todd Brown	399	Todd Brown	4
1983	Irving Fryar	40	Irving Fryar	780	Irving Fryar	8
1984	Shane Swanson	16	Todd Frain	218	Brian Hiemer	4
1985	Robb Schnitzler	16	Robb Schnitzler	382	Three tied	2
1986	Dana Brinson	14	Todd Millikan	230	Todd Millikan	4
1987	Rod Smith	21	Rod Smith	329	Tom Banderas	6
1988	Morgan Gregory	20	Todd Millikan	308	Todd Millikan	7
1989	Morgan Gregory	19	Richard Bell	357	Jon Bostick	6
1990	Jon Bostick	19	Jon Bostick	375	Johnny Mitchell	7
1991	Johnny Mitchell	31	Johnny Mitchell	534	Bostick / Mitchell	5
1992	Bell / Jones	14	Corey Dixon	279	Gerald Armstrong	7
1993	Abdul Muhammad	25	Abdul Muhammad	383	Gerald Armstrong	5
1994	Abdul Muhammad	23	Abdul Muhammad	360	Eric Alford	4
1995	Clester Johnson	22	Clester Johnson	367	Jon Vedral	5
1996	Brendan Holbein	23	Brendan Holbein	335	Holbein / Jackson	4
1997	Cheatham / Green	14	Matt Davison	232	Sheldon Jackson	2
1998	Matt Davison	32	Matt Davison	394	Sheldon Jackson	4
1999	Matt Davison	29	Matt Davison	441	Bobby Newcombe	3
2000	Matt Davison	21	Matt Davison	389	Tracey Wistrom	5
2001	Wilson Thomas	37	Wilson Thomas	616	Wilson Thomas	3
2002	Wilson Thomas	30	Wilson Thomas	353	Matt Herian	4
2003	Herian / Pilkington	22	Matt Herian	484	Matt Herian	3
2004	Ross Pilkington	27	Ross Pilkington	337	Herian / Kriewald	3
2005	Nate Swift	45	Nate Swift	641	Nunn / Swift	7
2006	Terrence Nunn	42	Maurice Purify	630	Maurice Purify	7
2007	Marlon Lucky	75	Maurice Purify	814	Maurice Purify	9
2008	Nate Swift	63	Nate Swift	941	Nate Swift	10
2009	Niles Paul	40	Niles Paul	796	McNeill / Paul	4
2010	Brandon Kinnie	44	Niles Paul	516	Kyler Reed	8
2011	Kenny Bell	32	Kenny Bell	461	Kenny Bell	3
2012	Kenny Bell	50	Kenny Bell	863	Kenny Bell	8
2013	Kenny Bell	52	Quincy Enunwa	753	Quincy Enunwa	12
2014	Kenny Bell	47	Kenny Bell	788	Kenny Bell	6
2015	Jordan Westerkamp	65	Jordan Westerkamp	918	Jordan Westerkamp	7
2016	Jordan Westerkamp	38	Jordan Westerkamp	526	Jordan Westerkamp	5
2017	Stanley Morgan	61	Stanley Morgan	986	Stanley Morgan	10
2018	Stanley Morgan	70	Stanley Morgan	1,004	J. D. Spielman	8
2019	J. D. Spielman	49	J. D. Spielman	898	J. D. Spielman	5
2020	Wan'Dale Robinson	51	Wan'Dale Robinson	461	Five tied	1
2021	Samori Toure	46	Samori Toure	898	Samori Toure	5
2022	Trey Palmer	71	Trey Palmer	1,043	Trey Palmer	9
2023	Billy Kemp	35	Billy Kemp	310	Thomas Fidone	4
2024	Jacory Barney Jr.	55	Jahmal Banks	587	Isaiah Neyor	5
2025	Emmett Johnson	46	Nyziah Hunter	617	Jacory Barney Jr. Nyziah Hunter; Dane Key	5

== Pass rushing ==
Program record

Year	Tackles for loss (Note: Tackles for loss include sacks since 1981.)		Sacks	
Records prior to 1968 are inconsistent or incomplete
1968	Sherwin Jarmon	10	Not available (Note: Sacks were not tracked until 1981.)	
1969	Jarmon / Walline	15	Not available	
1970	Ed Periard	12	Not available	
1971	Willie Harper	18	Not available	
1972	Harper / Johnson	9	Not available	
1973	John Bell	9	Not available	
1974	John Lee	10	Not available	
1975	John Lee	14	Not available	
1976	Jeff Pullen	12	Not available	
1977	George Andrews	8	Not available	
1978	Kerry Weinmaster	16	Not available	
1979	Cole / Weinmaster	10	Not available	
1980	Derrie Nelson	21	Not available	
1981	Jimmy Williams	18	Jimmy Williams	10
1982	Tony Felici	10	Felici / Strasburger	6
1983	Mark Daum	9	Herrmann / Stuckey	5
1984	Three tied	12	Chris Spachman	7
1985	Jim Skow	25	Jim Skow	15
1986	Danny Noonan	12	Danny Noonan	7
1987	Tim Rother	13	Tim Rother	10
1988	Broderick Thomas	17	Broderick Thomas	10
1989	Kent Wells	12	Kent Wells	
1990	Kenny Walker	21	Kenny Walker	11
1991	Travis Hill	9.5	Trev Alberts	7
1992	Travis Hill	12	Travis Hill	6
1993	Trev Alberts	21	Trev Alberts	15
1994	Christian Peter	14	Christian Peter	7
1995	Grant Wistrom	15	Jared Tomich	10
1996	Grant Wistrom	20	Grant Wistrom	9.5
1997	Grant Wistrom	17	Grant Wistrom	8.5
1998	Chad Kelsay	14	Eric Johnson	6
1999	Steve Warren	15	Steve Warren	7
2000	Kyle Vanden Bosch	17	Stella / Vanden Bosch	5.5
2001	Chris Kelsay	17	Demoine Adams	5.5
2002	Chris Kelsay	13	Chris Kelsay	7
2003	Demorrio Williams	21	Demorrio Williams	11
2004	Barrett Ruud	18	Benard Thomas	4
2005	Corey McKeon	22	Adam Carriker	9.5
2006	Jay Moore	17	Adam Carriker	7
2007	Steve Octavien	15	Barry Turner	3
2008	Ndamukong Suh	19	Ndamukong Suh	7.5
2009	Ndamukong Suh	24	Ndamukong Suh	12
2010	Jared Crick	17	Jared Crick	9.5
2011	Lavonte David	13	Lavonte David	5.5
2012	Eric Martin	18	Eric Martin	8.5
2013	Randy Gregory	19	Randy Gregory	10.5
2014	Maliek Collins	14	Randy Gregory	7
2015	Ross Dzuris	9	Ross Dzuris	9
2016	Ross Dzuris	11	Ross Dzuris	5.5
2017	Ben Stille	10	Ben Stille	3.5
2018	Luke Gifford	11	Luke Gifford	5.5
2019	Khalil Davis	12	Khalil Davis	8
2020	Domann / Honas	6.5	Will Honas	3
2021	Garrett Nelson	11.5	Garrett Nelson	5
2022	Garrett Nelson	9	Garrett Nelson	5.5
2023	Jimari Butler	8.5	Jimari Butler	5.5
2024	Jimari Butler	7	Ty Robinson	7
2025	Javin Wright	9.0	Javin Wright	3.0

== Tackles ==
Program record

Year	Total tackles		Unassisted tackles	
Records prior to 1965 are inconsistent or incomplete
1965	Mike Kennedy	69	Mike Kennedy	30
1966	Lynn Senkbeil	82	Carel Stith	42
1967	Wayne Meylan	119	Wayne Meylan	59
1968	Jerry Murtaugh	99	Al Larson	52
1969	Jerry Murtaugh	111	Jerry Murtaugh	41
1970	Jerry Murtaugh	132	Jerry Murtaugh	71
1971	Bob Terrio	96	Rich Glover	46
1972	Rich Glover	100	Rich Glover	52
1973	John Bell	96	John Bell	50
1974	Tom Ruud	104	Lee / Ruud	38
1975	Clete Pillen	125	Clete Pillen	47
1976	Clete Pillen	129	Clete Pillen	65
1977	Lee Kunz	141	Lee Kunz	46
1978	Lee Kunz	120	Lee Kunz	63
1979	Kim Baker	78	Kim Baker	51
1980	Jimmy Williams	66	Jimmy Williams	48
1981	Steve Damkroger	116	Steve Damkroger	59
1982	Steve Damkroger	79	Steve McWhirter	53
1983	Mike Knox	125	Mike Knox	64
1984	Marc Munford	96	Marc Munford	58
1985	Marc Munford	67	Marc Munford	43
1986	Marc Munford	90	Marc Munford	49
1987	LeRoy Etienne	75	Broderick Thomas	41
1988	Broderick Thomas	98	Broderick Thomas	53
1989	Pat Tyrance	74	Reggie Cooper	38
1990	Pat Tyrance	98	Pat Tyrance	41
1991	Steve Carmer	87	Steve Carmer	35
1992	Travis Hill	82	Travis Hill	35
1993	Trev Alberts	96	Trev Alberts	47
1994	Ed Stewart	96	Moss / Stewart	41
1995	Terrell Farley	62	Farley / Minter	27
1996	Jamel Williams	97	Jamel Williams	36
1997	Mike Brown	77	Mike Brown	36
1998	Mike Brown	102	Mike Brown	37
1999	Mike Brown	96	Mike Brown	56
2000	Carlos Polk	90	Carlos Polk	40
2001	Jamie Burrow	84	Keyuo Craver	35
2002	Demorrio Williams	92	Philip Bland	44
2003	Barrett Ruud	149	Demorrio Williams	83
2004	Barrett Ruud	143	Barrett Ruud	86
2005	Corey McKeon	98	Corey McKeon	61
2006	Stewart Bradley	76	Andre Jones	52
2007	Steve Octavien	92	Steve Octavien	56
2008	Ndamukong Suh	76	Larry Asante	45
2009	Ndamukong Suh	85	Ndamukong Suh	52
2010	Lavonte David	152	Lavonte David	84
2011	Lavonte David	133	Lavonte David	65
2012	Will Compton	110	Daimion Stafford	51
2013	Corey Cooper	91	Corey Cooper	52
2014	Zaire Anderson	103	Nate Gerry	49
2015	Nate Gerry	79	Dedrick Young	36
2016	Josh Banderas	93	Joshua Kalu	48
2017	Chris Weber	95	Chris Weber	39
2018	Mohamed Barry	112	Mohamed Barry	55
2019	Mohamed Barry	89	Will Honas	43
2020	JoJo Domann	58	Deontai Williams	37
2021	Luke Reimer	108	Luke Reimer	60
2022	Luke Reimer	86	Isaac Gifford	43
2023	Isaac Gifford	51	Isaac Gifford	44
2024	Isaac Gifford	73	DeShon Singleton	45
2025	Javin Wright	86	DeShon Singleton	44

== Secondary ==
Program record

Year	Interceptions		Pass breakups	
Records prior to 1945 are inconsistent or incomplete
1946	Joe Partington	2	Not available (Note: Pass breakup statistics unavailable until 1965.)	
1947	Cochrane / Novak	2	Not available	
1948	Tom Novak	3	Not available	
1949	Tom Novak	5	Not available	
1950	Ron Clark	4	Not available	
1951	Bob Decker	5	Not available	
1952	Dan Brown	3	Not available	
1953	Novak / Smith	3	Not available	
1954	Ron Clark	3	Not available	
1955	Willie Greenlaw	4	Not available	
1956	Nappi / Naviaux	2	Not available	
1957	Hawkins / Sandage	2	Not available	
1958	Larry Naviaux	2	Not available	
1959	Harry Tolly	2	Not available	
1960	Clay White	2	Not available	
1961	Dennis Claridge	2	Not available	
1962	Dave Theisen	3	Not available	
1963	Kent McCloughan	3	Not available	
1964	Love / Vactor	2	Not available	
1965	Marv Mueller	5	Marv Mueller	8
1966	Larry Wachholtz	7	Larry Wachholtz	8
1967	Ken Geddes	3	Dana Stephenson	6
1968	Dana Stephenson	5	Dana Stephenson	6
1969	Dana Stephenson	7	Anderson / Stephenson	4
1970	Bill Kosch	7	Jim Anderson	8
1971	Dave Mason	6	Jim Anderson	6
1972	Joe Blahak	3	Joe Blahak	8
1973	Bob Thornton	4	Zaven Yaralian	8
1974	Jim Burrow	4	Ardell Johnson	4
1975	Dave Butterfield	3	Dave Butterfield	5
1976	Dave Butterfield	4	Larry Valasek	5
1977	Jim Pillen	4	Ted Harvey	7
1978	Andy Means	3	Gary / Means	8
1979	Mark LeRoy	4	Ric Lindquist	5
1980	Ric Lindquist	3	Rodney Lewis	5
1981	Jeff Krejci	4	Jeff Krejci	6
1982	Allen Lyday	3	Bret Clark	8
1983	Bret Clark	5	Mike Knox	6
1984	Bret Clark	6	Bret Clark	8
1985	Carr / Washington	3	Brian Davis	8
1986	Fryar / Siebler	3	Charles Fryar	8
1987	Mark Blazek	3	Steve Forch	8
1988	Fryar / Jackson	4	Tim Jackson	5
1989	Reggie Cooper	4	Tahaun Lewis	8
1990	Tyrone Byrd	5	Three tied	8
1991	Kenny Wilhite	6	Tyrone Legette	9
1992	Reece / Wilhite	3	Kenny Wilhite	7
1993	Toby Wright	3	John Reece	9
1994	Barron Miles	5	Barron Miles	13
1995	Booker / Farley	3	Michael Booker	9
1996	Mike Minter	5	Ralph Brown	12
1997	Five tied	2	Ralph Brown	9
1998	Finley / Walker	3	Ralph Brown	14
1999	Mike Brown	5	Ralph Brown	15
2000	Troy Watchorn	5	DeJuan Groce	16
2001	Willie Amos	4	DeJuan Groce	14
2002	Groce / Washington	4	Fabian Washington	13
2003	Josh Bullocks	10	Fabian Washington	10
2004	Daniel Bullocks	5	Fabian Washington	15
2005	Corey McKeon	3	Zack Bowman	11
2006	Andrew Shanle	4	Cortney Grixby	11
2007	Grixby / Ruud	2	Grixby / Murillo	7
2008	Three tied	2	Murillo / West	9
2009	Matt O'Hanlon	6	Prince Amukamara	11
2010	Eric Hagg	5	Prince Amukamara	13
2011	Cassidy / David	2	Daimion Stafford	10
2012	Daimion Stafford	4	Stanley Jean-Baptiste	9
2013	Evans / Jean-Baptiste	4	Stanley Jean-Baptiste	12
2014	Nate Gerry	5	Josh Mitchell	13
2015	Nate Gerry	4	Three tied	7
2016	Kieron Williams	5	Joshua Kalu	11
2017	Kalu / Williams	2	Joshua Kalu	6
2018	Three tied	2	Dicaprio Bootle	15
2019	Jackson / Taylor	3	Lamar Jackson	12
2020	Cam Taylor	2	Bootle / Domann	5
2021	Deontai Williams	4	Cam Taylor	11
2022	Malcolm Hartzog	3	Quinton Newsome	10
2023	Tommi Hill	4	Tommi Hill	9
2024	Malcolm Hartzog	4	Ceyair Wright	6
2025	DeShon Singleton	2	Donovan Jones; Ceyair Wright	5

== See also ==
- Nebraska Cornhuskers football statistical leaders
