= List of Nebraska Cornhuskers in the NFL draft =

This is a list of Nebraska Cornhuskers in the NFL draft, showing the players of the Nebraska Cornhuskers football program who have been drafted into the National Football League and other major leagues. A total of 374 former Cornhuskers have been selected in the NFL or AFL draft, including thirty-four first-round selections and two players taken first overall.

== Position key ==
B	Back	E	End	QB	Quarterback
C	Center	FB	Fullback	RB	Running back
CB	Cornerback	G	Guard	S	Safety
DB	Defensive back	K	Kicker	T	Offensive tackle
DE	Defensive end	LB	Linebacker	TE	Tight end
DT	Defensive tackle	P	Punter	WR	Wide receiver

== NFL draft ==
Pro Football Hall of Fame	First-team All-Pro	Pro Bowl

Year	Rd.	Ovr.	Player	Team	Pos.
1936	3	25	Bernie Scherer	Packers	E
1937	1	1	Sam Francis	Eagles	B
1937	1	7	Lloyd Cardwell	Lions	B
1937	1	8	Les McDonald	Lions	E
1938	5	32	Fred Shirey	Eagles	T
1938	6	49	Elmer Dohrmann	Redskins	E
1938	8	68	Ted Doyle	Giants	B
1938	9	77	John Howell	Packers	B
1939	3	24	Charley Brock	Packers	C
1939	9	77	Bill Callihan	Lions	B
1939	9	80	Bob Mills	Giants	T
1940	8	69	George Seeman	Packers	E
1941	3	20	Harry Hopp	Lions	B
1941	4	29	Butch Luther	Rams	B
1941	5	31	Royal Kahler	Eagles	T
1941	6	46	Herm Rohrig	Packers	B
1941	7	54	Ray Prochaska	Rams	E
1941	16	149	Warren Alfson	Dodgers	G
1942	5	37	Vike Francis	Dodgers	B
1942	16	150	George Abel	Bears	G
1942	17	159	Fred Preston	Packers	E
1943	10	83	Vic Schleich	Dodgers	T
1943	12	109	Allen Zikmund	Bears	B
1944	15	148	Bert Gissler	Packers	E
1944	25	263	Howard Debus	Yanks	B
1944	27	280	Al Grubaugh	Packers	T
1945	13	128	Wally Hopp	Lions	B
1945	18	186	Frank Hazard	Packers	G
1945	21	218	Sam Vacanti	Giants	QB
1947	10	83	Carl Samuelson	Rams	T
1948	23	210	John Pesek	Rams	E
1948	32	298	Tom Novak	Eagles	C
1949	23	226	Cletus Fischer	Giants	B
1950	4	48	Tom Novak	Bears	C
1950	26	338	Charlie Toogood	Browns	T
1951	3	35	Charlie Toogood	Rams	T
1951	4	43	Fran Nagle	Eagles	B
1952	14	166	Frank Simons	49ers	E
1953	4	40	Don Boll	Redskins	G
1953	7	84	Bobby Reynolds	Rams	B
1953	9	99	Ed Husmann	Cardinals	G
1954	3	33	Ted Connor	Eagles	T
1954	9	104	Jerry Minnick	Redskins	T
1954	14	169	Ray Novak	Lions	B
1955	5	52	Don Glantz	Redskins	T
1955	11	125	Ron Clark	Packers	B
1955	15	181	Bob Smith	Browns	B
1955	24	281	Charley Bryant	Packers	G
1957	18	208	Clarence Cook	Rams	E
1957	18	211	Laverne Torczon	Browns	G
1961	4	50	Ron McDole	Cardinals	T
1961	17	232	Pat Fischer	Cardinals	B
1963	3	39	Dennis Claridge	Packers	B
1963	5	58	Bill Thornton	Cardinals	B
1963	11	141	Dave Theisen	Rams	B
1964	1	2	Bob Brown	Eagles	T
1964	1	13	Lloyd Voss	Packers	T
1964	5	57	Rudy Johnson	49ers	B
1964	5	62	John Kirby	Vikings	LB
1964	9	121	Willie Ross	Cardinals	B
1964	15	202	Monte Kiffin	Vikings	T
1964	15	204	Larry Kramer	Colts	T
1964	18	242	Bob Jones	Redskins	G
1964	20	273	Bob Hohn	Rams	CB
1965	3	34	Kent McCloughan	Rams	B
1965	12	160	John Strohmeyer	Redskins	T
1965	19	263	Preston Love	Lions	B
1966	2	21	Walt Barnes	Redskins	DT
1966	3	44	Bob Pickens	Bears	T
1966	3	46	Tony Jeter	Packers	E
1966	9	132	Freeman White	Giants	WR
1966	12	183	Rich Czap	Browns	T
1966	13	196	Jim Brown	Cardinals	T
1966	16	242	Lynn Senkbeil	Bears	LB
1966	19	283	Dick Fitzgerald	Bears	T
1967	3	68	Harry Wilson	Eagles	RB
1967	4	86	Carel Stith	Oilers (AFL)	T
1967	9	229	Ron Kirkland	Colts	RB
1967	10	244	Pete Tatman	Vikings	RB
1967	13	326	Kaye Carstens	Bears	DB
1968	4	104	Wayne Meylan	Browns	LB
1968	5	114	Ben Gregory	Bills (AFL)	RB
1968	7	185	Bob Taucher	Cowboys	T
1969	7	177	James Hawkins	Rams	DB
1969	12	306	Dick Davis	Browns	RB
1970	7	164	Jim McFarland	Cardinals	TE
1970	7	175	Ken Geddes	Lions	LB
1970	8	183	Dana Stephenson	Bears	DB
1970	8	206	Mike Wynn	Raiders	DE
1970	10	251	Frank Patrick	Packers	TE
1970	15	390	Bob Liggett	Chiefs	DT
1970	16	406	Mike Green	Chargers	RB
1970	17	439	Glenn Patterson	Cowboys	C
1971	2	49	Joe Orduna	49ers	RB
1971	3	71	Bob Newton	Bears	T
1971	8	190	Paul Rogers	Steelers	K
1971	11	261	Dan Schneiss	Patriots	TE
1972	1	11	Jerry Tagge	Packers	QB
1972	1	23	Jeff Kinney	Chiefs	RB
1972	1	24	Larry Jacobson	Giants	DE
1972	5	112	Carl Johnson	Saints	T
1972	8	204	Van Brownson	Colts	QB
1972	10	242	Keith Wortman	Packers	G
1973	1	25	Johnny Rodgers	Chargers	WR
1973	2	41	Willie Harper	49ers	LB
1973	2	49	Monte Johnson	Raiders	LB
1973	3	61	Bill Olds	Colts	RB
1973	3	69	Rich Glover	Giants	DT
1973	5	108	Doug Dumler	Patriots	C
1973	8	183	Joe Blahak	Oilers	DB
1973	8	206	Bill Janssen	Steelers	T
1973	10	246	Dave Mason	Vikings	S
1973	11	283	Jerry List	Raiders	RB
1974	1	5	John Dutton	Colts	DE
1974	4	79	Steve Manstedt	Oilers	LB
1974	4	98	Darryl White	Bengals	G
1974	6	156	Bob Wolfe	Dolphins	T
1974	7	178	Maury Damkroger	Patriots	LB
1974	10	235	Frosty Anderson	Saints	WR
1974	13	329	Ralph Powell	Falcons	RB
1975	1	19	Tom Ruud	Bills	LB
1975	2	42	Bob Nelson	Bills	LB
1975	4	92	John Starkebaum	Saints	DB
1975	5	128	David Humm	Raiders	QB
1975	6	131	Don Westbrook	Colts	WR
1975	6	147	Mark Doak	Redskins	T
1975	6	153	Tom Alward	Jets	G
1975	6	156	Marvin Crenshaw	Steelers	T
1975	11	277	Ardell Johnson	Redskins	DB
1975	14	358	Ritch Bahe	Cardinals	WR
1975	16	412	Dennis Pavelka	Redskins	G
1975	17	442	Stan Hegener	Steelers	G
1976	3	84	Rik Bonness	Raiders	C
1976	4	106	Tony Davis	Bengals	RB
1976	4	112	Wonder Monds	Steelers	DB
1976	6	163	Bob Martin	Jets	LB
1976	8	218	Jim Burrow	Packers	DB
1976	11	308	Dean Gissler	Redskins	DE
1976	12	330	John O'Leary	Bears	RB
1976	13	348	Brad Jenkins	Buccaneers	TE
1976	13	351	John Lee	Chargers	DT
1976	14	402	Larry Mushinskie	Cowboys	TE
1976	16	458	Rick Costanzo	Cowboys	T
1977	2	34	Mike Fultz	Saints	DT
1977	4	91	Vince Ferragamo	Rams	QB
1977	5	133	Ray Phillips	Bengals	LB
1977	6	157	Ron Pruitt	Bills	DE
1977	7	189	Bob Lingenfelter	Browns	T
1977	11	307	Dave Butterfield	Jets	CB
1978	2	44	Brett Moritz	Buccaneers	G
1978	3	70	Stan Waldemore	Falcons	G
1978	4	88	Dodie Donnell	Jets	RB
1978	5	114	Ken Spaeth	Bills	TE
1978	6	140	Thomas Davis	Raiders	C
1978	7	187	Mark Dufresne	Steelers	TE
1978	8	218	Monte Anthony	Colts	RB
1978	10	253	Greg Jorgensen	Giants	G
1979	1	19	George Andrews	Rams	LB
1979	1	22	Kelvin Clark	Broncos	T
1979	3	59	Barney Cotton	Bengals	G
1979	3	80	Rick Berns	Buccaneers	RB
1979	6	162	Steve Lindquist	Dolphins	G
1979	7	174	Lee Kunz	Bears	LB
1979	10	264	Frank Lockett	Packers	WR
1979	11	287	Randy Poeschl	Browns	DE
1980	1	7	Junior Miller	Falcons	TE
1980	3	59	Rod Horn	Bengals	DT
1980	3	75	Bill Barnett	Dolphins	DE
1980	3	79	Tim Smith	Oilers	WR
1980	4	104	I. M. Hipp	Falcons	RB
1980	5	115	Dan Pensick	Chiefs	DT
1980	7	184	John Havekost	Broncos	G
1980	9	226	Kelly Saalfeld	Packers	C
1980	9	239	Mark Goodspeed	Dolphins	T
1980	10	258	Ken Brown	Vikings	WR
1981	2	29	Russell Gary	Saints	S
1981	2	52	Jarvis Redwine	Vikings	RB
1981	2	56	Andra Franklin	Dolphins	RB
1981	4	108	Derrie Nelson	Cowboys	LB
1981	9	235	John Noonan	Dolphins	WR
1981	9	244	Randy Schleusener	Browns	G
1981	12	309	Joe Adams	Cardinals	WR
1982	1	15	Jimmy Williams	Lions	LB
1982	3	58	Rodney Lewis	Saints	DB
1982	7	173	Henry Waechter	Bears	DT
1982	7	175	Phil Bates	Lions	RB
1982	12	330	Tom Carlstrom	Jets	G
1983	1	25	Dave Rimington	Bengals	C
1983	2	49	Roger Craig	49ers	RB
1983	3	63	Jamie Williams	Giants	TE
1983	6	154	Todd Brown	Lions	WR
1983	10	259	Jeff Merrill	49ers	DT
1983	10	265	Toby Williams	Patriots	DE
1983	10	272	Bruce Mathison	Chargers	QB
1984	1	1	Irving Fryar	Patriots	WR
1984	1	2	Dean Steinkuhler	Oilers	T
1984	6	144	Scott Raridon	Eagles	T
1985	2	29	Mark Traynowicz	Bills	G
1985	2	47	Mark Behning	Steelers	T
1985	7	191	Bret Clark	Raiders	S
1985	9	243	Scott Strasburger	Cowboys	LB
1985	10	267	Jeff Smith	Chiefs	RB
1985	12	315	Shane Swanson	Browns	WR
1986	3	56	Tom Rathman	49ers	RB
1986	3	58	Jim Skow	Bengals	DE
1986	7	181	Paul Miles	Seahawks	RB
1986	7	191	Bill Lewis	Raiders	C
1987	1	12	Danny Noonan	Cowboys	DT
1987	2	30	Brian Davis	Redskins	CB
1987	4	111	Marc Munford	Broncos	LB
1987	9	225	Stan Parker	Giants	G
1988	1	2	Neil Smith	Chiefs	DE
1988	4	90	Tim Rother	Raiders	DT
1988	6	147	Keith Jones	Rams	RB
1988	8	203	Keith Neubert	Jets	TE
1988	10	272	Brian Washington	Browns	S
1988	11	300	Hendley Hawkins	Browns	WR
1988	11	301	Stave Forch	Bears	LB
1989	1	6	Broderick Thomas	Buccaneers	LB
1989	5	115	Lawrence Pete	Lions	DT
1989	8	204	Dana Brinson	Chargers	WR
1989	9	224	Tim Jackson	Cowboys	S
1989	10	270	Todd Millikan	Bears	TE
1989	11	290	Willie Griffin	Buccaneers	DE
1989	12	323	Steve Taylor	Colts	QB
1990	3	57	Jeff Mills	Chargers	LB
1990	6	160	Kent Wells	Redskins	DT
1990	8	206	Ken Clark	Colts	RB
1990	8	207	Gerry Gdowski	Saints	QB
1990	12	319	Richard Bell	Steelers	RB
1991	1	3	Bruce Pickens	Falcons	CB
1991	1	4	Mike Croel	Broncos	LB
1991	8	200	Kenny Walker	Broncos	DE
1991	8	201	Pat Tyrance	Rams	LB
1991	9	247	Tahaun Lewis	Raiders	DB
1991	11	283	Joe Sims	Falcons	DT
1992	1	15	Johnny Mitchell	Jets	TE
1992	3	72	Tyrone Legette	Saints	CB
1992	6	167	Nate Turner	Bills	RB
1992	7	173	Curtis Cotton	Raiders	DB
1992	7	193	Jon Bostick	Broncos	WR
1992	11	288	Mike Petko	Patriots	LB
1992	12	316	Keithen McCant	Browns	QB
1993	2	55	John Parrella	Bills	DT
1993	3	74	Will Shields	Chiefs	G
1993	4	109	Derek Brown	Saints	RB
1993	5	137	Tyrone Hughes	Saints	CB
1993	7	180	Travis Hill	Browns	LB
1993	7	184	Lance Lewis	Colts	RB
1994	1	5	Trev Alberts	Colts	LB
1994	2	49	Toby Wright	Rams	S
1994	3	80	Calvin Jones	Raiders	RB
1994	4	113	John Reece	Cardinals	DB
1994	7	213	Lance Lundberg	Saints	T
1995	2	38	Zach Wiegert	Rams	T
1995	3	91	Brenden Stai	Steelers	G
1995	3	97	Troy Dumas	Chiefs	LB
1995	4	125	Donta Jones	Steelers	LB
1995	4	128	Rob Zatechka	Giants	G
1995	6	192	Cory Schlesinger	Lions	RB
1995	6	199	Barron Miles	Steelers	DB
1996	1	6	Lawrence Phillips	Rams	RB
1996	3	93	Tyrone Williams	Packers	CB
1996	4	112	Aaron Graham	Cardinals	C
1996	5	149	Christian Peter	Patriots	DT
1996	6	171	Doug Colman	Giants	LB
1996	6	181	Tony Veland	Broncos	DB
1997	1	11	Michael Booker	Falcons	CB
1997	2	39	Jared Tomich	Saints	DE
1997	2	56	Mike Minter	Panthers	S
1997	3	72	Adam Treu	Raiders	T
1997	4	106	Chris Dishman	Cardinals	G
1997	5	132	Jamel Williams	Redskins	S
1997	5	142	Eric Stokes	Seahawks	S
1997	7	221	Jon Hesse	Jaguars	LB
1998	1	6	Grant Wistrom	Rams	DE
1998	1	14	Jason Peter	Panthers	DT
1998	3	67	Scott Frost	Jets	S
1998	3	76	Ahman Green	Seahawks	RB
1998	7	190	Aaron Taylor	Colts	C
1998	7	216	Eric Warfield	Chiefs	CB
1999	2	38	Mike Rucker	Panthers	DE
1999	4	116	Joel Makovicka	Cardinals	FB
1999	4	123	Jason Wiltz	Jets	DT
1999	5	156	Jay Foreman	Bills	LB
1999	7	219	Chad Kelsay	Steelers	LB
1999	7	228	Kris Brown	Steelers	K
1999	7	230	Sheldon Jackson	Bills	TE
2000	2	39	Mike Brown	Bears	S
2000	3	74	Steve Warren	Packers	DT
2000	5	140	Ralph Brown	Giants	CB
2001	2	34	Kyle Vanden Bosch	Cardinals	DE
2001	2	50	Dominic Raiola	Lions	C
2001	4	112	Carlos Polk	Chargers	LB
2001	4	121	Correll Buckhalter	Eagles	RB
2001	5	151	Russ Hochstein	Buccaneers	G
2001	6	166	Bobby Newcombe	Cardinals	WR
2001	6	192	Dan Alexander	Titans	RB
2002	2	39	Toniu Fonoti	Chargers	G
2002	3	95	Eric Crouch	Rams	WR
2002	4	125	Keyuo Craver	Saints	DB
2002	7	250	Tracey Wistrom	Buccaneers	TE
2003	2	48	Chris Kelsay	Bills	DE
2003	4	107	DeJuan Groce	Rams	CB
2003	7	222	Josh Brown	Seahawks	K
2003	7	251	Scott Shanle	Rams	LB
2004	4	101	Demorrio Williams	Falcons	LB
2004	6	175	Jammal Lord	Texans	S
2004	6	190	Josh Sewell	Broncos	C
2004	7	204	Ryon Bingham	Chargers	DT
2004	7	234	Trevor Johnson	Jets	DE
2005	1	23	Fabian Washington	Raiders	CB
2005	2	36	Barrett Ruud	Buccaneers	LB
2005	2	40	Josh Bullocks	Saints	S
2005	3	81	Richie Incognito	Rams	C
2006	2	40	Daniel Bullocks	Lions	S
2006	6	203	Sam Koch	Ravens	P
2006	6	206	Le Kevin Smith	Patriots	DT
2006	7	220	Titus Adams	Jets	DT
2007	1	13	Adam Carriker	Rams	DE
2007	2	63	Brandon Jackson	Packers	RB
2007	3	87	Stewart Bradley	Eagles	LB
2007	4	104	Jay Moore	49ers	DE
2008	5	142	Zack Bowman	Bears	CB
2008	5	164	Carl Nicks	Saints	T
2008	6	197	Bo Ruud	Patriots	LB
2009	5	158	Cody Glenn	Redskins	RB
2009	6	193	Matt Slauson	Jets	G
2009	7	228	Lydon Murtha	Lions	T
2010	1	2	Ndamukong Suh	Lions	DT
2010	4	115	Phillip Dillard	Giants	LB
2010	5	160	Larry Asante	Browns	S
2011	1	19	Prince Amukamara	Giants	CB
2011	4	105	Roy Helu	Redskins	RB
2011	4	120	Alex Henery	Eagles	K
2011	5	146	DeJon Gomes	Redskins	S
2011	5	155	Niles Paul	Redskins	WR
2011	6	196	Keith Williams	Steelers	G
2011	7	248	Eric Hagg	Browns	S
2012	2	58	Lavonte David	Buccaneers	LB
2012	4	126	Jared Crick	Texans	DE
2012	7	224	Alfonzo Dennard	Patriots	CB
2012	7	234	Marcel Jones	Saints	T
2013	6	190	Rex Burkhead	Bengals	RB
2013	7	248	Daimion Stafford	Titans	S
2014	2	58	Stanley Jean-Baptiste	Saints	CB
2014	3	78	Spencer Long	Redskins	G
2014	6	209	Quincy Enunwa	Jets	WR
2015	2	54	Ameer Abdullah	Lions	RB
2015	2	60	Randy Gregory	Cowboys	LB
2015	5	162	Kenny Bell	Buccaneers	WR
2016	3	67	Maliek Collins	Cowboys	DT
2016	3	96	Vincent Valentine	Patriots	DT
2016	4	130	Alex Lewis	Ravens	T
2016	6	176	Andy Janovich	Broncos	FB
2017	5	184	Nate Gerry	Eagles	DB
2018	6	203	Tanner Lee	Jaguars	QB
2020	6	194	Khalil Davis	Buccaneers	DT
2020	7	232	Carlos Davis	Steelers	DT
2021	5	159	Brenden Jaimes	Chargers	T
2021	7	238	Matt Farniok	Cowboys	G
2022	2	51	Cam Jurgens	Eagles	C
2022	2	60	Cam Taylor-Britt	Bengals	CB
2022	7	258	Samori Toure	Packers	WR
2023	6	189	Ochaun Mathis	Rams	DE
2023	6	191	Trey Palmer	Buccaneers	WR
2025	4	111	Ty Robinson	Eagles	DT
2025	7	219	Thomas Fidone	Giants	TE
2026	5	161	Emmett Johnson	Chiefs	RB

=== Supplemental draft ===
No Nebraska player has been selected in a standalone supplemental draft since its inception in 1977. Three were drafted in the 1984 NFL supplemental draft of USFL and CFL players.

Year	Rd.	Ovr.	Player	NFL team	USFL/CFL team	Pos.
1984 USFL/CFL	1	2	Mike Rozier	Oilers	Maulers (USFL)	RB
1984 USFL/CFL	3	64	Turner Gill	Jets	Concordes (CFL)	QB
1984 USFL/CFL	3	80	Mark Schellen	49ers	Breakers (USFL)	RB

== AFL draft ==
Pro Football Hall of Fame	First-team All-Pro

Year (Note: From 1960 to 1966, the American Football League drafted competitively against the NFL, and some players were selected by both leagues. The leagues held a common draft from 1967 until the 1970 AFL–NFL merger.)	Rd.	Ovr.	Player	Team	Pos.
1960	N/A (Note: The inaugural AFL draft did not follow a traditional draft order. Instead, most selections were made by drawing names at random at each position until rosters were full.)		Carroll Zaruba	Texans	B
1961	4	25	Ron McDole	Broncos	DE
1961	27	209	Donald Olson	Broncos	B
1961	29	225	Archie Cobb	Broncos	T
1963	22	171	Bill Thornton	Jets	FB
1963	26	201	Dennis Claridge	Jets	QB
1963	26	208	Dave Theisen	Chiefs	B
1964	1	4	Bob Brown	Broncos	DT
1964	2	11	Lloyd Voss	Jets	DE
1964	2	16	John Kirby	Chargers	LB
1964	12	90	Willie Ross	Bills	FB
1964	12	91	Rudy Johnson	Jets	B
1964	17	133	Larry Kramer	Bills	T
1964	20	154	Bob Hohn	Chiefs	CB
1965	6	48	John Strohmeyer	Broncos	DE
1965	11	82	Kent McCloughan	Oilers	DB
1966	2	11	Freeman White	Broncos	TE
1966	3	23	Walt Barnes	Chiefs	DT
1966	10	89	Tony Jeter	Raiders	TE

=== Redshirt draft ===
Year	Rd.	Ovr.	Player	Team	Pos.
1966	2	15	Bob Pickens	Chiefs	T
1966	5	42	Lynn Senkbeil	Chiefs	LB
1966	5	45	Dick Czap	Bills	T
1966	10	86	Dick Fitzgerald	Jets	T

== Other drafts ==
=== CFL ===
Year (Note: The Canadian Football League is the only league to draft competitively against the NFL. It drafts twice each year – a standard draft and a global draft, which is reserved for players not of Canadian or American origin.)	Rd.	Ovr.	Player	Team	Pos.	Country
1989	7	51	Pete Buchanan	Tiger-Cats	LB	Canada
1992	4	26	Terris Chorney	Eskimos	C	Canada
2002	3	24	Dahrran Diedrick	Eskimos	RB	Canada (born: Jamaica)
2003	3	19	Patrick Kabongo	Renegades	DT	Canada (born: Zaire)
2018	3	21	David Knevel	Lions	T	Canada
2024 global	1	1	Eteva Mauga-Clements	Elks	LB	American Samoa
2024 global	2	18	Nouredin Nouili	Alouettes	G	Germany

=== UFL ===
Year	Rd.	Ovr.	Player	Team	Pos.
2024 (Note: The 2024 UFL draft consisted of players who were undrafted in the NFL.)	10	76	Omar Brown	Defenders	S
2027 (Note: The 2027 UFL draft consisted of players who were eligible for the 2023–2026 NFL drafts.)	15	114	Heinrich Haarberg	Renegades	TE/QB

== Notable undrafted players ==
Note: the first NFL draft was held in 1936

Pro Football Hall of Fame	First-team All-Pro	Pro Bowl

Debut	Player	Team	Pos.
1920	Guy Chamberlin	Staleys	E
1922	Link Lyman	(CAN) Bulldogs	T
1923	Bub Weller	All-Stars	T
1924	Joy Berquist	(KC) Cowboys	B
1924	Verne Lewellen	Packers	B
1924	Dave Noble	(CLE) Bulldogs	B
1925	Al Bloodgood	(KC) Cowboys	B
1926	Ed Weir	Yellow Jackets	T
1926	Joe Wostoupal	(KC) Cowboys	C
1928	Arnold Oehlrich	Yellow Jackets	B
1930	Ray Richards	Yellow Jackets	T
1931	Glenn Presnell	Spartans	B
1934	Bernie Masterson	Bears	QB
1954	Nick Adduci	Redskins	DB
1962	Mick Tingelhoff	Vikings	C
1963	Warren Powers	Raiders (AFL)	S
1963	Dennis Stuewe	Vikings	CB
1968	Jim McCord	Vikings	DE
1971	Jerry Patton	Vikings	DT
1971	Ted Vactor	Redskins	CB
1975	Bob Schmit	Giants	LB
1978	Ed Burns	Saints	QB
1979	Jeff Lee	Cardinals	WR
1980	Oudious Lee	Eagles	DT
1981	Jeff Finn	Steelers	TE
1984	Mitch Krenk	Bears	TE
1984	Allen Lyday	Oilers	DB
1985	Mark Daum	Browns	LB
1986	Todd Frain	Redskins	TE
1986	Mike Knox	Oilers	LB
1987	Brian Blankenship	Steelers	G
1987	Doug DuBose	49ers	RB
1993	David White	Patriots	LB
1995	Terry Connealy	Jets	DT
1998	Terrell Farley	Packers	CB
1999	Bill Lafleur	Saints	P
2001	Clint Finley	Cowboys	S
2002	Erwin Swiney	Packers	CB
2004	T. J. Hollowell	Giants	LB
2004	Patrick Kabongo	Lions	DT
2004	Kyle Larson	Bengals	P
2006	Cory Ross	Ravens	RB
2009	Zach Potter	Jets	TE
2009	Nate Swift	Broncos	TE
2012	Curenski Gilleylen	Packers	WR
2013	Will Compton	Redskins	LB
2014	Jeremiah Sirles	Chargers	G
2015	Brent Qvale	Jets	T
2017	Tommy Armstrong	Vikings	QB
2017	Cethan Carter	Bengals	TE
2018	Nick Gates	Giants	T
2018	Brett Maher	Cowboys	K
2019	Freedom Akinmoladun	Giants	DE
2019	Luke Gifford	Cowboys	LB
2020	Lamar Jackson	Jets	CB
2021	Jack Stoll	Eagles	TE
2022	Austin Allen	Giants	TE
2022	JoJo Domann	Colts	LB
2023	Garrett Nelson	Dolphins	LB
2023	Travis Vokolek	Ravens	TE
2024	Omar Brown	Broncos	S
2024	Quinton Newsome	Broncos	CB
2025	Jahmal Banks	Ravens	WR
2025	John Bullock	Buccaneers	LB
2025	Isaiah Neyor	Packers	WR
2026	Heinrich Haarberg	Panthers	TE
2026	Dane Key	Broncos	WR
2026	Henry Lutovsky	Buccaneers	G
2026	Dasan McCullough	Broncos	LB
2026	DeShon Singleton	Chiefs	S
2026	Ceyair Wright	Bengals	CB
2026	Javin Wright	Buccaneers	LB
