= Nebraska Cornhuskers football statistical leaders =

This list of Nebraska Cornhuskers football statistical leaders shows the individual career, season, and single-game leaders of the Nebraska Cornhuskers football program in passing, rushing, receiving, total offense, defensive stats, and kicking. Nebraska began competing in intercollegiate football in 1890, but early records are often incomplete and inconsistent as they were reported and compiled by various newspapers or wire services, which often contradicted each other. The university generally excludes records prior to 1946.

These lists are dominated by recent players for several reasons, including college football's progressively increasing season length, the NCAA forbidding freshmen from playing varsity football until 1972, and the exclusion of bowl game statistics in official records prior to 2002. For consistency, statistics from bowl games prior to 2002 are not included in these lists.

== Rushing ==
=== Yards ===
Career
Rank	Player	Yards	Years
1	Mike Rozier	4,780	1981–1983
2	Ameer Abdullah	4,588	2011–2014
3	Ahman Green	3,880	1995–1997
4	Eric Crouch	3,434	1998–2001
5	Roy Helu	3,404	2007–2010
6	Rex Burkhead	3,329	2009–2012
7	Calvin Jones	3,153	1991–1993
8	Ken Clark	3,037	1987–1989
9	Taylor Martinez	2,975	2010–2013
10	I. M. Hipp	2,814	1977–1979

Season
Rank	Player	Yards	Year
1	Mike Rozier	2,295	1983
2	Ahman Green	2,083	1997
3	Lawrence Phillips	1,826	1994
4	Mike Rozier	1,807	1982
5	Ameer Abdullah	1,690	2013
6	Ameer Abdullah	1,611	2014
7	Ken Clark	1,533	1988
8	Emmett Johnson	1,451	2025
9	Jammal Lord	1,412	2002
10	Rex Burkhead	1,357	2011

Game
Rank	Player	Yards	Year	Opponent
1	Roy Helu	307	2010	Missouri
2	Calvin Jones	294	1991	Kansas
3	Mike Rozier	285	1983	Kansas
4	Ken Clark	256	1988	Oklahoma State
5	Rick Berns	255	1978	Missouri
6	I. M. Hipp	254	1977	Indiana
7	Mike Rozier	251	1982	Oklahoma State
8	Keith Jones	248	1987	Colorado
9	Taylor Martinez	241	2010	Kansas State
10	Keith Jones	240	1987	Iowa State

=== Touchdowns ===
Career
Rank	Player	TDs	Years
1	Eric Crouch	59	1998–2001
2	Mike Rozier	49	1981–1983
3	Ahman Green	42	1995–1997
4	Calvin Jones	40	1991–1993
5	Ameer Abdullah	39	2011–2014
6	Tommie Frazier	36	1992–1995
7	Adrian Martinez	35	2018–2021
8	Keith Jones	32	1984–1997
8	Steve Taylor	32	1985–1988
10	Taylor Martinez	31	2010–2013

Season
Rank	Player	TDs	Year
1	Mike Rozier	29	1983
2	Ahman Green	22	1997
3	Eric Crouch	20	2000
4	Bobby Reynolds	19	1950
4	Scott Frost	19	1997
4	Ameer Abdullah	19	2014
7	Eric Crouch	18	2001
8	Jeff Kinney	16	1971
8	Lawrence Phillips	16	1994
8	Eric Crouch	16	1999

Game
Rank	Player	TDs	Year	Opponent
1	Calvin Jones	6	1991	Kansas
2	Rick Berns	4	1976	Hawaii
2	Mike Rozier	4	1982	Oklahoma State
2	Mike Rozier	4	1983	Iowa State
2	Mike Rozier	4	1983	Kansas
2	Lawrence Phillips	4	1995	Michigan State
2	Taylor Martinez	4	2010	Kansas State
2	Ameer Abdullah	4	2014	Northwestern
9	Many tied	3		

== Passing ==
=== Yards ===
Career
Rank	Player	Yards	Years
1	Tommy Armstrong	8,871	2013–2016
2	Adrian Martinez	8,491	2018–2021
3	Taylor Martinez	7,258	2010–2013
4	Zac Taylor	5,850	2005–2006
5	Joe Ganz	5,125	2006–2008
6	David Humm	5,035	1972–1974
7	Dylan Raiola	4,819	2024–2025
8	Jerry Tagge	4,704	1969–1971
9	Eric Crouch	4,481	1998–2001
10	Tommie Frazier	3,521	1992–1995

Season
Rank	Player	Yards	Year
1	Joe Ganz	3,568	2008
2	Zac Taylor	3,197	2006
3	Tanner Lee	3,143	2017
4	Tommy Armstrong	3,030	2015
5	Taylor Martinez	2,871	2012
6	Adrian Martinez	2,863	2021
7	Dylan Raiola	2,819	2024
8	Tommy Armstrong	2,695	2014
9	Zac Taylor	2,653	2005
10	Adrian Martinez	2,617	2018

Game
Rank	Player	Yards	Year	Opponent
1	Joe Ganz	510	2007	Kansas State
2	Joe Ganz	484	2007	Colorado
3	Sam Keller	438	2007	Ball State
4	Zac Taylor	431	2005	Iowa State
4	Tanner Lee	431	2017	Purdue
6	Ryker Fyfe	407	2015	Purdue
7	Joe Ganz	405	2007	Kansas
8	Tanner Lee	399	2017	Penn State
9	Zac Taylor	395	2006	Kansas
10	Zac Taylor	392	2005	Colorado

=== Touchdowns ===
Career
Rank	Player	TDs	Years
1	Tommy Armstrong	67	2013–2016
2	Taylor Martinez	56	2010–2013
3	Zac Taylor	45	2005–2006
3	Adrian Martinez	45	2018–2021
5	Joe Ganz	44	2006–2008
6	Tommie Frazier	43	1992–1995
7	David Humm	41	1972–1974
8	Turner Gill	34	1980–1983
9	Jerry Tagge	32	1969–1971
9	Vince Ferragamo	32	1975–1976

Season
Rank	Player	TDs	Year
1	Zac Taylor	26	2006
2	Joe Ganz	25	2008
3	Taylor Martinez	23	2012
3	Tanner Lee	23	2017
5	Tommy Armstrong	22	2014
5	Tommy Armstrong	22	2015
7	Vince Ferragamo	20	1976
8	Gerry Gdowski	19	1989
8	Zac Taylor	19	2005
10	Six tied	18	

Game
Rank	Player	TDs	Year	Opponent
1	Joe Ganz	7	2007	Kansas State
2	Steve Taylor	5	1987	UCLA
2	Eric Crouch	5	2000	Iowa
2	Joe Dailey	5	2004	Baylor
2	Taylor Martinez	5	2010	Oklahoma State
6	Many tied	4		

== Receiving ==
=== Receptions ===
Career
Rank	Player	Rec	Years
1	Stanley Morgan	189	2015–2018
2	Kenny Bell	181	2011–2014
3	J. D. Spielman	170	2017–2019
4	Jordan Westerkamp	167	2013–2016
5	Nate Swift	166	2005–2008
6	Johnny Rodgers	143	1970–1972
7	Terrence Nunn	136	2004–2007
8	Marlon Lucky	135	2005–2008
9	Quincy Enunwa	115	2010–2013
10	Todd Peterson	108	2005–2008

Season
Rank	Player	Rec	Year
1	Marlon Lucky	75	2007
2	Trey Palmer	71	2022
3	Stanley Morgan	70	2018
4	J. D. Spielman	66	2018
5	Jordan Westerkamp	65	2015
6	Nate Swift	63	2008
7	Todd Petersen	62	2008
8	Stanley Morgan	61	2017
9	Johnny Rodgers	58	1972
10	Maurice Purify	57	2007

Game
Rank	Player	Rec	Year	Opponent
1	Dennis Richnafsky	14	1967	Kansas State
2	Marlon Lucky	13	2007	Texas A&M
3	Marlon Lucky	11	2007	Ball State
3	Maurice Purify	11	2007	Colorado
3	Nate Swift	11	2008	Baylor
3	Jordan Westerkamp	11	2015	Southern Miss
3	J. D. Spielman	11	2017	Ohio State
3	Kwazi Gilmer	11	2026	Maryland
9	Five tied	10		

=== Yards ===
Career
Rank	Player	Yards	Years
1	Stanley Morgan	2,747	2015–2018
2	Kenny Bell	2,689	2011–2014
3	J. D. Spielman	2,546	2017–2019
4	Johnny Rodgers	2,479	1970–1972
5	Nate Swift	2,476	2005–2008
6	Jordan Westerkamp	2,474	2013–2016
7	Terrence Nunn	1,762	2004–2007
8	Todd Peterson	1,602	2005–2008
9	Niles Paul	1,532	2007–2010
10	Quincy Enunwa	1,526	2010–2013

Season
Rank	Player	Yards	Year
1	Trey Palmer	1,043	2022
2	Johnny Rodgers	1,013	1972
3	Stanley Morgan	1,004	2018
4	Stanley Morgan	986	2017
5	Johnny Rodgers	956	1971
6	Nate Swift	941	2008
7	Jordan Westerkamp	918	2015
8	J. D. Spielman	898	2019
8	Samori Toure	898	2021
10	Kenny Bell	863	2012

Game
Rank	Player	Yards	Year	Opponent
1	Trey Palmer	237	2022	Purdue
2	J. D. Spielman	209	2018	Wisconsin
3	J. D. Spielman	200	2017	Ohio State
4	Stanley Morgan	185	2017	Penn State
5	Matt Davison	167	1998	Texas A&M
6	Chuck Malito	166	1976	Hawaii
7	Trey Palmer	165	2022	Iowa
8	Guy Ingles	163	1969	Oklahoma State
8	Stanley Morgan	163	2018	Minnesota
10	J. D. Spielman	160	2019	Illinois

=== Touchdowns ===
Career
Rank	Player	TDs	Years
1	Johnny Rodgers	25	1970–1972
2	Nate Swift	22	2005–2008
2	Stanley Morgan	22	2015–2018
4	Kenny Bell	21	2011–2014
5	Clarence Swanson	18	1919–1921
5	Jordan Westerkamp	18	2013–2016
7	Maurice Purify	16	2006–2007
8	Jon Bostick	15	1989–1991
8	Quincy Enunwa	15	2010–2013
8	J. D. Spielman	15	2017–2019

Season
Rank	Player	TDs	Year
1	Quincy Enunwa	12	2013
2	Johnny Rodgers	11	1971
3	Nate Swift	10	2008
3	Stanley Morgan	10	2017
5	Clarence Swanson	9	1921
5	Maurice Purify	9	2007
5	Trey Palmer	9	2022
8	Six tied	8	

Game
Rank	Player	TDs	Year	Opponent
1	Clarence Swanson	3	1921	Colorado Agricultural
1	Johnny Rodgers	3	1971	Minnesota
1	Frosty Anderson	3	1973	Minnesota
1	Don Westbrook	3	1974	Kansas
1	Tom Banderas	3	1987	Missouri
1	Tracey Wistrom	3	2000	Iowa
1	Maurice Purify	3	2007	Kansas
1	Frantz Hardy	3	2007	Kansas State
1	Maurice Purify	3	2007	Colorado
1	Brandon Kinnie	3	2010	Oklahoma State

== Total offense ==
Total offense (for an individual player) is the sum of passing, rushing, and receiving yards.

Career
Rank	Player	Yards	Years
1	Adrian Martinez	10,792	2018–2021
2	Tommy Armstrong	10,690	2013–2016
3	Taylor Martinez	10,233	2010–2013
4	Eric Crouch	7,915	1998–2001
5	Zac Taylor	5,777	2005–2006
6	Tommie Frazier	5,476	1992–1995
7	Joe Ganz	5,466	2006–2008
8	Jammal Lord	5,421	2000–2003
9	Jerry Tagge	5,283	1969–1971
10	David Humm	5,027	1972–1974

Season
Rank	Player	Yards	Year
1	Taylor Martinez	3,890	2012
2	Joe Ganz	3,826	2008
3	Tommy Armstrong	3,430	2015
4	Tommy Armstrong	3,400	2014
5	Adrian Martinez	3,388	2021
6	Adrian Martinez	3,246	2018
7	Zac Taylor	3,165	2006
8	Tanner Lee	3,046	2017
9	Taylor Martinez	2,963	2011
10	Jammal Lord	2,774	2002

Game
Rank	Player	Yards	Year	Opponent
1	Joe Ganz	528	2007	Kansas State
2	Joe Ganz	521	2007	Colorado
3	Adrian Martinez	446	2019	Illinois
4	Adrian Martinez	441	2018	Wisconsin
5	Taylor Martinez	435	2010	Oklahoma State
6	Zac Taylor	433	2005	Iowa State
7	Tommy Armstrong	431	2015	Southern Miss
8	Sam Keller	423	2007	Ball State
9	Tommy Armstrong	422	2014	USC
10	Joe Ganz	416	2007	Kansas

== All-purpose yards ==
All-purpose yardage is the sum of rushing, receiving, kick return, and punt return yardage.

Career
Rank	Player	Yards	Years
1	Ameer Abdullah	7,186	2011–2014
2	Johnny Rodgers	5,586	1970–1972
3	Mike Rozier	5,445	1981–1983
4	Ahman Green	4,280	1995–1997
5	Marlon Lucky	4,214	2005–2008
6	Niles Paul	4,122	2007–2010
7	Kenny Bell	4,075	2011–2014
8	Rex Burkhead	3,953	2009–2012
9	Roy Helu	3,905	2007–2010
10	J. D. Spielman	3,725	2017–2019

Season
Rank	Player	Yards	Year
1	Mike Rozier	2,486	1983
2	Ameer Abdullah	2,272	2014
3	Johnny Rodgers	2,011	1972
4	Ameer Abdullah	1,999	2013
5	Johnny Rodgers	1,983	1971
6	Ahman Green	1,982	1997
7	Lawrence Phillips	1,894	1994
8	Ameer Abdullah	1,884	2012
9	Emmett Johnson	1,821	2025
10	Mike Rozier	1,790	1982

Game
Rank	Player	Yards	Year	Opponent
1	Ameer Abdullah	341	2014	Rutgers
2	Roy Helu	321	2010	Missouri
3	Ameer Abdullah	313	2014	Miami (FL)
4	Calvin Jones	298	1991	Kansas
5	Trey Palmer	297	2022	Purdue
6	J. D. Spielman	291	2017	Minnesota
7	Rick Berns	289	1978	Missouri
8	Mike Rozier	285	1983	Kansas
9	I. M. Hipp	284	1977	Indiana
10	Jeff Smith	273	1984	Minnesota

== Scoring ==
Career
Rank	Player	Points	Years
1	Alex Henery	397	2007–2010
2	Kris Brown	388	1995–1998
3	Eric Crouch	368	1998–2001
4	Drew Brown	355	2014–2017
5	Josh Brown	315	1999–2002
6	Mike Rozier	312	1981–1983
7	Ameer Abdullah	288	2011–2014
8	Ahman Green	270	1995–1997
9	Johnny Rodgers	264	1970–1972
10	Calvin Jones	252	1991–1993

Season
Rank	Player	Points	Year
1	Mike Rozier	174	1983
2	Bobby Reynolds	157	1950
3	Ahman Green	132	1997
3	Ameer Abdullah	132	2014
5	Eric Crouch	120	2000
6	Brett Maher	119	2012
7	Kris Brown	116	1997
7	Eric Crouch	116	2001
9	Scott Frost	114	1997
10	Alex Henery	110	Twice

== Defense ==
=== Tackles ===
Career
Rank	Player	Tackles	Years
1	Barrett Ruud	432	2001–2004
2	Jerry Murtaugh	342	1968–1970
3	Luke Reimer	293	2019–2023
4	Mike Brown	287	1996–1999
5	Lavonte David	285	2010–2011
6	Dedrick Young	284	2015–2018
7	Lee Kunz	276	1976–1978
8	Clete Pillen	273	1974–1976
8	Nathan Gerry	273	2013–2016
10	Steve Damkroger	269	1979–1982

Season
Rank	Player	Tackles	Year
1	Lavonte David	152	2010
2	Barrett Ruud	149	2003
3	Barrett Ruud	143	2004
4	Lee Kunz	141	1977
5	Lavonte David	133	2011
6	Jerry Murtaugh	132	1970
7	Clete Pillen	129	1976
8	Demorrio Williams	128	2003
9	Clete Pillen	125	1975
9	Mike Knox	125	1983

Game
Rank	Player	Tackles	Year	Opponent
1	Clete Pillen	30	1976	Oklahoma State
2	Clete Pillen	27	1975	Oklahoma
3	Jerry Murtaugh	25	1970	USC
4	Lee Kunz	23	1977	Oklahoma
5	Rich Glover	22	1971	Oklahoma
6	Ken Geddes	20	1968	Missouri
7	Eight tied	19		

(Note: Tackles includes the total of solo and assisted tackles)

=== Sacks ===
Career
Rank	Player	Sacks	Years
1	Trev Alberts	29.5	1991–1993
2	Grant Wistrom	26.5	1994–1997
3	Jim Skow	26.0	1983–1985
4	Danny Noonan	24.0	1984–1986
4	Ndamukong Suh	24.0	2005–2009
6	Broderick Thomas	22.5	1985–1988
7	Adam Carriker	20.5	2003–2006
8	Jared Crick	20.0	2008–2011
9	Randy Gregory	17.5	2013–2014
10	Barry Turner	17.0	2005–2009

Season
Rank	Player	Sacks	Year
1	Jim Skow	15.0	1985
1	Trev Alberts	15.0	1993
3	Danny Noonan	12.0	1986
3	Ndamukong Suh	12.0	2009
5	Danny Noonan	11.0	1985
5	Broderick Thomas	11.0	1986
5	Kenny Walker	11.0	1990
5	Demorrio Williams	11.0	2003
9	Randy Gregory	10.5	2013
10	Five tied	10.0	

Game
Rank	Player	Sacks	Year	Opponent
1	Jared Crick	5.0	2009	Baylor
2	Ndamukong Suh	4.5	2009	Texas
3	Jim Skow	4.0	1985	Missouri
3	Danny Noonan	4.0	1986	Florida State
3	Kenny Walker	4.0	1990	Oregon State
3	Trev Alberts	4.0	1993	Texas Tech
3	Mike Rucker	4.0	1996	Texas Tech

=== Tackles for loss ===
Career
Rank	Player	TFL	Years
1	Grant Wistrom	58.5	1994–1997
2	Ndamukong Suh	57	2005–2009
3	Barrett Ruud	50	2001–2004
4	Trev Alberts	45	1990–1993
5	Jim Skow	44	1982–1985
6	Willie Harper	41	1970–1972
6	Adam Carriker	41	2003–2006
8	Kerry Weinmaster	39	1976–1979
8	Broderick Thomas	39	1985–1988
10	Two tied	38	

Season
Rank	Player	TFL	Year
1	Jim Skow	25	1985
2	Ndamukong Suh	24	2009
3	Corey McKeon	22	2005
4	Derrie Nelson	21	1980
4	Kenny Walker	21	1990
4	Trev Alberts	21	1993
4	Demorrio Williams	21	2003
8	Grant Wistrom	20	1996
9	Ndamukong Suh	19	2008
9	Randy Gregory	19	2013

=== Interceptions ===
Career
Rank	Player	INTs	Years
1	Dana Stephenson	14	1967–1969
2	Josh Bullocks	13	2002–2004
2	Nathan Gerry	13	2013–2016
4	Bret Clark	12	1982–1984
5	Tom Novak	11	1946–1949
5	Larry Wachholtz	11	1964–1966
5	Tyrone Byrd	11	1989–1992
5	Ralph Brown	11	1996–1999
5	Fabian Washington	11	2002–2004
10	Two tied	10	

Season
Rank	Player	INTs	Year
1	Josh Bullocks	10	2003
2	Larry Wachholtz	7	1966
2	Dana Stephenson	7	1969
2	Bill Kosch	7	1970
5	Dave Mason	6	1971
5	Kenny Wilhite	6	1991
5	Matt O'Hanlon	6	2009
8	Sixteen tied	5	

=== Pass breakups ===
Career
Rank	Player	PBUs	Years
1	Ralph Brown	50	1996–1999
2	Keyuo Craver	41	1998–2001
2	DeJuan Groce	41	1999–2002
4	Erwin Swiney	38	1997–2001
4	Fabian Washington	38	2002–2004
6	Cortney Grixby	32	2004–2007
7	Prince Amukamara	27	2007–2010
7	Joshua Kalu	27	2014–2017
7	Dicaprio Bootle	27	2017–2020
10	Josh Mitchell	25	2011–2014

Season
Rank	Player	PBUs	Year
1	DeJuan Groce	17	2000
2	Ralph Brown	15	1999
2	Fabian Washington	15	2004
2	Dicaprio Bootle	15	2018
5	Ralph Brown	14	1998
5	DeJuan Groce	14	2001
5	Zack Bowman	14	2005
8	Seven tied	13	

Game
Rank	Player	PBUs	Year	Opponent
1	Ralph Brown	7	1996	Colorado
2	Fabian Washington	6	2004	Kansas
3	Joe Blahak	5	1972	Oklahoma State
3	DeJuan Groce	5	2000	Iowa State
3	DeJuan Groce	5	2001	Missouri
3	Erwin Swiney	5	2001	Baylor
3	Kellen Huston	5	2004	Pittsburgh
3	Zack Bowman	5	2005	Michigan
3	Stanley Jean-Baptiste	5	2012	Northwestern
3	Dicaprio Bootle	5	2018	Michigan

== Special teams ==
=== Kicking ===
Career pct. (min. two seasons)
Rank	Player	Pct.	Years
1	Alex Henery	0.895	2007–2010
2	Jordan Congdon	0.800	2005–2006
3	Brett Maher	0.780	2009–2012
4	Drew Brown	0.776	2014–2017
5	Gregg Barrios	0.743	1986–1990
6	Kris Brown	0.740	1995–1998
7	Connor Culp	0.704	2020–2021
8	Josh Brown	0.694	1999–2002
9	Dale Klein	0.659	1984–1986
10	Billy Todd	0.622	1977–1978

Season pct. (min. ten att.)
Rank	Player	Pct.	Year
1	Alex Henery	0.947	2010
2	Pat Smith	0.923	2013
3	Connor Culp	0.867	2020
4	Kris Brown	0.857	1997
4	Alex Henery	0.857	2008
4	Alex Henery	0.857	2009
4	Drew Brown	0.857	2016
4	Drew Brown	0.857	2017
9	Kyle Cunanan	0.842	2025
10	Jordan Congdon	0.826	2005
10	Brett Maher	0.826	2011

Longest field goal
Rank	Player	Yards	Year	Opponent
1	Alex Henery	57	2008	Colorado
2	Paul Rogers	55	1969	Kansas
2	Billy Todd	55	1977	Kansas
2	Chris Drennan	55	1989	Northern Illinois
2	Tristan Alvano	55	2023	Purdue
6	Rich Sanger	54	1972	Texas A&M
6	Brett Maher	54	2012	UCLA
6	John Hohl	54	2024	Ohio State
9	Alex Henery	53	2010	Oklahoma
10	Four tied	52		

=== Punting ===
Career avg. (min. fifty punts)
Rank	Player	Avg.	Years
1	Dan Hadenfeldt	44.5	1997–2000
2	Sam Koch	44.0	2002–2005
3	Kyle Larson	43.7	2001–2003
4	Brett Maher	43.2	2011–2012
5	Brian Buschini	43.1	2022–2024
6	Sam Foltz	42.6	2013–2015
7	William Przystup	42.5	2019–2021
8	Alex Henery	42.2	2007–2010
9	Jesse Kosch	41.9	1994–1997
10	Isaac Armstrong	41.8	2018–2019

Season avg. (min. thirty punts)
Rank	Player	Avg.	Year
1	Sam Koch	46.5	2005
2	Kyle Larson	45.1	2003
3	Dan Hadenfeldt	45.0	1999
4	Bill Lafleur	44.9	1998
5	Jesse Kosch	44.7	1996
5	Brian Buschini	44.7	2024
7	Brett Maher	44.5	2011
8	Sam Foltz	44.2	2015
9	Brian Buschini	44.0	2022
10	Dan Hadenfeldt	43.8	2000

Longest punt
Rank	Player	Yards	Year	Opponent
1	Mike Stigge	87	1992	Oklahoma State
2	Sam Koch	84	2005	Pittsburgh
2	William Przystup	84	2021	Northwestern
4	Kyle Larson	80	2003	Texas
5	Sam Koch	76	2005	Wake Forest
5	Alex Henery	76	2009	Virginia Tech
7	Jesse Kosch	74	1995	Arizona State
8	Darin Erstad	73	1994	Oklahoma
8	Dan Hadenfeldt	73	1999	California
8	Isaac Armstrong	73	2018	Bethune–Cookman

=== Kick returns ===
Career
Rank	Player	Yards	Years
1	Josh Davis	2,265	2000–2003
2	Niles Paul	1,887	2007–2010
3	Ameer Abdullah	1,592	2011–2014
4	Tyrone Hughes	1,443	1989–1992
5	Kenny Bell	1,277	2011–2014
6	Joe Walker	1,159	1997–2000
7	Dana Brinson	1,154	1985–1988
8	Cortney Grixby	1,094	2004–2007
9	Johnny Rodgers	847	1970–1972
10	J. D. Spielman	835	2017–2019

Season
Rank	Player	Yards	Year
1	Cortney Grixby	1,094	2007
2	Josh Davis	994	2002
3	Niles Paul	969	2008
4	Ameer Abdullah	763	2011
5	Josh Davis	675	2001
6	J. D. Spielman	669	2017
7	Kenny Bell	609	2013
8	Josh Davis	596	2003
9	Tyrone Hughes	523	1990
10	Dana Brinson	510	1988

Longest kick return
Rank	Player	Yards	Year	Opponent
1	Owen Frank	105	1911	Kansas State
2	Ron Clark	100	1949	Kansas State
2	Niles Paul	100	2010	Oklahoma State
2	Ameer Abdullah	100	2011	Fresno State
5	Tyrone Hughes	99	1990	Kansas State
5	Joe Walker	99	1998	Louisiana Tech
5	Kenny Bell	99	2013	Penn State
5	J. D. Spielman	99	2017	Arkansas State
9	Johnny Rodgers	98	1971	Texas A&M
9	Keith Jones	98	1985	Kansas

=== Punt returns ===
Career
Rank	Player	Yards	Years
1	Johnny Rodgers	1,515	1970–1972
2	DeJuan Groce	1,218	1999–2002
3	De'Mornay Pierson-El	904	2014–2017
4	Bobby Newcombe	829	1997–2000
5	Tyrone Hughes	817	1989–1992
6	Larry Wachholtz	788	1964–1966
7	Dana Brinson	767	1985–1988
8	Irving Fryar	708	1981–1983
9	Jeff Smith	665	1981–1984
10	Joe Walker	653	1997–2000

Season
Rank	Player	Yards	Year
1	DeJuan Groce	732	2002
2	Johnny Rodgers	618	1972
3	De'Mornay Pierson-El	596	2014
4	Johnny Rodgers	548	1971
5	DeJuan Groce	469	2001
6	Larry Wachholtz	452	1965
7	Niles Paul	407	2009
8	Johnny Rodgers	349	1970
9	Cortney Grixby	333	2005
10	Dana Brinson	330	1986

Longest punt return
Rank	Player	Yards	Year	Opponent
1	Eric Hagg	95	2010	Texas
2	Bobby Newcombe	94	2000	Missouri
3	Johnny Rodgers	92	1971	Oklahoma State
4	DeJuan Groce	89	2002	Missouri
5	Nate Swift	88	2008	Virginia Tech
6	Dave Butterfield	87	1976	TCU
7	De'Mornay Pierson-El	86	2014	Fresno State
8	Pat Fischer	84	1960	Oklahoma State
9	DeJuan Groce	83	2002	Troy State
10	Three tied	82		
