= Clarence Swanson =

American football player (1898–1970)

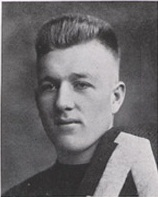

Profile
- Position: End

Personal information
- Born: March 15, 1898; Wakefield, Nebraska, U.S.
- Died: December 3, 1970 (aged 72); Lincoln, Nebraska, U.S.
- Listed height: 5 ft 10 in (1.78 m)
- Listed weight: 167 lb (76 kg)

Career information
- High school: Wakefield (Nebraska)
- College: Nebraska (1918–1921)

Awards and highlights
- Second-team All-American (1921); Third-team All-American (1920)
- College Football Hall of Fame (Class of 1973)

Clarence Emanuel Swanson (March 15, 1898 – December 3, 1970) was an American college football player for the Nebraska Cornhuskers. He was elected to the College Football Hall of Fame in 1973.

== Biography ==
Swanson was born in Wakefield, Nebraska, and attended high school there, where he played football, baseball, and basketball. He graduated in 1917 and enrolled at the University of Nebraska in Lincoln, Nebraska. He was a member of the Sigma Alpha Epsilon fraternity, and was in the Naval Training Corps during World War I.

Swanson played for the Nebraska Cornhuskers football team from 1918 to 1921, as an end during the one-platoon system era. As captain of the 1921 squad, he addressed a student crowd at the train station before departing for a game against the Pittsburgh Panthers, stating, "We are going into the game to win and will win. The east will recognize us as the 'Fighting Nebraskans'." Swanson had a touchdown reception as Nebraska prevailed, 10–0. The team finished with a record of 9–1, losing only to Notre Dame, and outscored opponents by a total of 283 to 17.

Swanson was the first Cornhusker to have three touchdown receptions in game, a mark he set in 1921 in his final collegiate game, which has been equalled several times but has yet to be surpassed. Swanson also set Nebraska records for most touchdown receptions in a season and in a career, which stood for over 50 years, but have since been surpassed. He earned a varsity letter with the Cornhuskers baseball team.

After graduating from Nebraska, Swanson served as a coach for the 1922 Cornhuskers. He also worked as a traveling sales representative, then joined a women's clothing firm in 1924. After 18 months, he became a partner in the firm, which was renamed Hovland-Swanson. (Note: Swanson was married to Helen Hovland.) The company, based in Lincoln, operated multiple department stores; Swanson became the firm's president in 1952. He was involved in various efforts to support businesses in Lincoln, including the chamber of commerce. He served on the university's board of regents from 1954 to 1966, with the Lincoln Journal Star opining that Swanson was "instrumental in laying the administrative groundwork for the rise to national prominence of the Nebraska Cornhusker team."

Swanson was a Scottish Rite Freemason and belonged to the Shriners and Lions. He died in Lincoln in December 1970 and was survived by his wife and two children.

Swanson was inducted to the College Football Hall of Fame in 1973, and to Nebraska's football hall of fame in 1974. Nebraska has bestowed the Clarence E. Swanson Memorial Award since 1972 "for outstanding contributions to the University of Nebraska and the Husker athletic department through personal service, personal support of athletic department programs and dedication to the Husker football program and intercollegiate athletics." He was inducted to the Nebraska High School Sports Hall of Fame in 2007. In 2017, Swanson's no. 1 jersey was retired by the Cornhuskers football program.

One of Swanson's great-grandsons, Barrett Ruud, played college football at Nebraska then professionally in the NFL, and has also coached at Nebraska and in the NFL.

== See also ==
- Nebraska Cornhuskers football statistical leaders
