= Phil Tabor =

American football player (born 1956)

No. 80
- Positions: Defensive end, defensive tackle

Personal information
- Born: November 30, 1956 (age 69); Little Rock, Arkansas, U.S.
- Listed height: 6 ft 4 in (1.93 m)
- Listed weight: 255 lb (116 kg)

Career information
- College: Oklahoma
- NFL draft: 1979: 4th round, 90th overall pick

Career history
- New York Giants (1979–1982)

Awards and highlights
- First-team All-Big Eight (1978); Second-team All-Big Eight (1977)

Career NFL statistics
- Sacks: 12.5
- Fumble recoveries: 2
- Stats at Pro Football Reference

Philip Martin Tabor (born November 30, 1956) is an American former professional football player who was a defensive lineman in the National Football League (NFL). He played college football for the Oklahoma Sooners. Tabor played four seasons in the NFL with the New York Giants. He is the identical twin brother of former NFL player Paul Tabor.
