= Keith "End Zone" Jones =

American football player (born 1966)

Keith Jones
No. 26
- Position: Running back

Personal information
- Born: February 5, 1966 (age 60); Omaha, Nebraska, U.S.
- Listed height: 5 ft 9 in (1.75 m)
- Listed weight: 190 lb (86 kg)

Career information
- High school: Omaha Central
- College: Nebraska
- NFL draft: 1988: 6th round, 147th overall pick

Career history
- Los Angeles Rams (1988); Cleveland Browns (1989); Dallas Cowboys (1990–1991)

Awards and highlights
- 2× First-team All-Big Eight (1986, 1987)

Career NFL statistics
- Rushing yards: 160
- Average: 3.7
- Touchdowns: 1
- Stats at Pro Football Reference

Keith "End Zone" Jones (born February 5, 1966) is an American former professional football player who was a running back in the National Football League (NFL). He played college football for the Nebraska Cornhuskers, twice earning first-team all-conference honors in the Big Eight. Jones was selected in the sixth round of the 1988 NFL draft by the Los Angeles Rams and played one season for the Cleveland Browns. He joined the Dallas Cowboys, but was sidelined the entire time by knee and back injuries.

== Early life ==
Jones was born in Omaha, Nebraska, where he grew up the youngest of seven children. They were raised by their single mother after their parents' marriage ended in 1966 and their father left Omaha. Jones chose to play high school football at Omaha Central High School instead of joining his brother Lee, who was a year older than him, on Omaha Benson's team. Benson offered Jones the chance to play as a sophomore, while Central's program was more restrictive and required players to workout with weights and prove themselves before being allowed to play.

Jones did not play football much until his junior year. Entering his senior year, he was nicknamed "End Zone" when he was being teased about his success. That season, he rushed for modern-day Metro Conference records of 1,710 yards and an average of 190.0 yards per game, drawing comparisons to Pro Football Hall of Fame running back and former Central star Gale Sayers. (Note: Some sources, including the Omaha World-Herald, say Jones broke Sayers' Central school record of 1,500 rushing yards in a season set in 1960. However, the Omaha World-Herald has also written that Jones broke the school record of 1,587 set by Terry Evans in 1980.) Jones averaged 9.1 yards per carry and scored 18 touchdowns, including 11 plays over 35 yards. He broke the conference single-season rushing record of 1,624 yards set by Victor Breakfield of Omaha Burke in 1981.

== College career ==
Jones chose to play college football locally for the Nebraska Cornhuskers over the Washington Huskies. He loved the mountains and waters around Seattle, but it was easier to have his family at games by attending the University of Nebraska–Lincoln, He joined his brother Lee, who was already playing for the Huskers.

Jones was not expecting to play on the varsity team as a freshman, feeling that he was not physically prepared after arriving at 5 feet 9 inches (1.75 m) and 176 pounds (80 kg). In two junior varsity games, he ran for 240 yards and four touchdowns and averaged 7.7 yards per carry. However, he lettered that season after being promoted to varsity following Paul Miles' season-ending separated shoulder injury against Syracuse. The No. 3 I-back behind Doug DuBose and Jeff Smith, Jones ran for 186 yards on 29 carries for a 6.4-yard average and two touchdowns.

Jones elected to play in 1985 instead of sitting out the season as a redshirt. He spent most of his sophomore season as the No. 3 I-back before supplanting Miles at No. 2 behind DuBose towards the end of the season. On November 16 against Kansas, Jones returned a kickoff 98 yards for a touchdown in the third quarter of a 56–6 win. It was Nebraska's first kickoff return for a touchdown since Mike Rozier's 93-yard return against Oklahoma State in 1981. Jones also added a then-career-high 84 yards rushing on eight attempts. In 10 games that year, he gained 240 yards on 38 carries (6.3-yard average) for three touchdowns.

As a junior in 1986, Jones became a starter after DuBose, who was coming off consecutive 1,000-yard seasons, injured his knee in the first scrimmage before the season. His brother Lee, a redshirt junior defensive tackle, also became a starter that season. In the second game of the season, Jones ran for 168 yards and two touchdowns. He ended the season with 830 yards and 14 touchdowns in 10 games, and led the Big Eight Conference with 83.0 yards rushing per game. He was second in the conference in rushing yards behind Darrell Wallace (872) of Missouri. Jones missed one game after ligament damage in a thumb required surgery, and played the last two games of the regular season with a special cast. He was voted a first-team All-Big Eight selection by the Associated Press (AP) and United Press International (UPI). Jones was limited in the 1987 Sugar Bowl by a deep thigh bruise suffered in the first half of the regular season finale against Oklahoma. With Tyreese Knox starting in his place, Jones had six rushes for 20 yards as a reserve in a 30–15 win over LSU.

In his senior year in 1987, Jones rushed for 1,232 yards and 13 touchdowns, including 582 yards in the final three regular-season games. He ran for 240 yards against Iowa State and two weeks later, in Nebraska's regular season finale against one of their rivals, Colorado, he carried 26 times for a career-high 248 yards and ran for touchdowns of 50 and 44 yards in a 24–7 win, earning him Big Eight offensive player of the week honors. The ninth Cornhusker to gain 1,000 or more yards rushing in a season, Jones ended his career ranked No. 3 at the time in school history with 2,488 career rushing yards, (Note: Through the 2022 season, Jones ranks No. 17 all-time.) passing Rick Berns (2,449) and Roger Craig (2,446) to finish behind Mike Rozier (4,780) and I. M. Hipp (2,814). Ranked eighth in the nation with 123.2 yards rushing per game, Jones received honorable mention from UPI for their All-America team, and again earned first-team All-Big Eight honors from the AP and UPI. In the 1988 Fiesta Bowl, he carried 15 times for 80 yards and a touchdown in a 31–28 loss to Florida State.

Jones was electronically timed at 4.33 seconds in the 40-yard dash in 1985, which broke the record for Cornhusker football players, previously held by Irving Fryar (4.43). Jones also competed in track, winning the 1985 Big Eight 60-yard dash indoor title at 6.23 seconds. He needed to alternate between adding bulk for football and being lean and sleek for track. Jones said that around his senior year, football coach Tom Osborne told him to quit track.

== Professional career ==
Jones was selected by the Los Angeles Rams in the sixth round of the 1988 NFL draft with the 147th overall pick. He joined a Rams team that had two 1,000-yard rushers, Charles White and Greg Bell, and first-round pick Gaston Green. Jones began his rookie season on injured reserve with an injured ankle. The Rams later released him before re-signing him after he cleared waivers. A few weeks later, he was again placed on injured reserve, spending the final 12 weeks of the season there with a minor ankle issue.

Jones signed with the Cleveland Browns as a Plan B free agent in 1989, receiving a $155,000 salary and $15,000 signing bonus. However, they later traded up and acquired running back Eric Metcalf in the first round of the draft. Jones started the first two games of the season but ended the season as a backup to Metcalf and Kevin Mack. Metcalf had been holding out for more money until Jones ran for 133 yards in the team's second preseason game. The fullback Mack began the season serving a suspension because of a drug conviction. Jones ended the season with 160 yards rushing and a touchdown along with 15 receptions. He played on special teams for the first time that season and became a leader on the kick coverage and return teams, placing second on the team with 21 special teams tackles. He blocked a punt against Indianapolis that Lawyer Tillman recovered in the end zone for a touchdown.

In 1990, Jones signed a two-year contract worth $800,000 with the Dallas Cowboys as a Plan B free agent and also received an $80,000 signing bonus. Cowboys coach Jimmy Johnson tagged him as a probable starter. Weeks later, the Cowboys traded for former first-round pick Terrence Flagler and traded again to move up in the draft to select Emmitt Smith in the first round. During the first week of training camp, Jones tore the anterior cruciate ligament in his right knee. He underwent major surgery and missed the season. Following a year of rebab, he underwent surgery in May 1991 for a ruptured disc in his back. Jones began the 1991 season on the physically unable to perform list. After he passed a physical in September, the Cowboys released him.

In 1993, Jones won an arbitration settlement of $200,000—one year's pay—from the Cowboys. He said that three months after his back surgery, Johnson told him to either play or be released. According to Jones, doctors said he needed eight months after his procedure before he could face full contact. NFL rules require a team to pay an injured player who is cut.

== See also ==
- Nebraska Cornhuskers football statistical leaders
