= 1978 All-Big Eight Conference football team =

American all-star college football team

The 1978 All-Big Eight Conference football team consists of American football players chosen by various organizations for All-Big Eight Conference teams for the 1978 NCAA Division I-A football season. The selectors for the 1978 season included the Associated Press (AP) and United Press International (UPI).

== Offensive selections ==
=== Quarterbacks ===
- Thomas Lott, Oklahoma (AP-1; UPI-1)
- Phil Bradley, Missouri (AP-2; UPI-1)

=== Running backs ===
- Billy Sims, Oklahoma (AP-1; UPI-1)
- Rick Berns, Nebraska (AP-1; UPI-1)
- Dexter Green, Iowa State (AP-1; UPI-2)
- James Mayberry, Colorado (AP-2; UPI-2)
- I. M. Hipp, Nebraska (AP-2; UPI-2)
- Kenny King, Oklahoma (AP-2)
- Kenny Brown, Nebraska (UPI-2)

=== Tight ends ===
- Junior Miller, Nebraska (AP-1; UPI-2)
- Kellen Winslow, Missouri (AP-2; UPI-1)

=== Centers ===
- Peter Allard, Missouri (AP-1; UPI-1)
- Jody Farthing, Oklahoma (AP-2; UPI-2)

=== Offensive guards ===
- Greg Roberts, Oklahoma (AP-1; UPI-1)
- Steve Lindquist, Nebraska (AP-1; UPI-1)
- Paul Tabor, Oklahoma (AP-2)
- Jim Clark, Oklahoma State (AP-2)
- Barney Cotton, Nebraska (UPI-2)
- Craig Simmons, Oklahoma State (UPI-2)

=== Offensive tackles ===
- Matt Miller, Colorado (AP-1; UPI-1)
- Kelvin Clark, Nebraska (AP-1; UPI-1)
- Dick Cuvelier, Iowa State (AP-2; UPI-2)
- Sam Claphan, Oklahoma (AP-2; UPI-2)

=== Wide receivers ===
- Charlie Green, Kansas State (AP-1; UPI-1)
- Eugene Goodlow, Kansas State (AP-2; UPI-2)

== Defensive selections ==
=== Defensive ends ===
- George Andrews, Nebraska (AP-1; UPI-1)
- Rick White, Iowa State (AP-2; UPI-1)
- Reggie Mathis, Oklahoma (AP-1)
- Stuart Walker, Colorado (AP-2; UPI-2)
- Jim Zidd, Kansas (UPI-2)

=== Defensive tackles ===
- Mike Stensrud, Iowa State (AP-1; UPI-1)
- Rod Horn, Nebraska (AP-2; UPI-1)
- Phil Tabor, Oklahoma (AP-1)
- Ruben Vaughan, Colorado (AP-2; UPI-2)
- Chris Boskey, Iowa State (UPI-2)

=== Nose guards ===
- Reggie Kinlaw, Oklahoma (AP-1; UPI-1)
- Kerry Weinmaster, Nebraska (AP-2)
- Laval Short, Colorado (UPI-2)

=== Linebackers ===
- Darryl Hunt, Oklahoma (AP-1; UPI-1)
- John Corker, Oklahoma State (AP-1; UPI-1)
- George Cumby, Oklahoma (AP-1; UPI-2)
- Lee Kunz, Nebraska (AP-2; UPI-2)
- Chris Garlich, Missouri (AP-2)
- Tom Boskey, Iowa State (AP-2)

=== Defensive backs ===
- Darrol Ray, Oklahoma (AP-1; UPI-1)
- Mark Haynes, Colorado (AP-1; UPI-1)
- Mike Schwartz, Iowa State (UPI-1; UPI-1)
- Jim Pillen, Nebraska (AP-1; UPI-2)
- Russ Calabrese, Missouri (AP-2; UPI-1)
- LeRoy Irvin, Kansas (AP-2; UPI-2)
- Mike Babb, Oklahoma (AP-2)
- Sam Owen, Kansas State (UPI-2)
- Gregg Johnson, Oklahoma State (UPI-2)

== Special teams ==
=== Place-kicker ===
- Uwe von Schamann, Oklahoma (AP-1; UPI-1)
- Billy Todd, Nebraska (UPI-2)

=== Punters ===
- Mike Hubach, Kansas (AP-1; UPI-1)
- Tim Smith, Nebraska (UPI-2)

== Key ==
AP = Associated Press

UPI = United Press International

== See also ==
- 1978 College Football All-America Team
