= Paul Tabor =

American football player (born 1956)

No. 53
- Positions: Center, guard

Personal information
- Born: November 30, 1956 (age 69); Little Rock, Arkansas, U.S.
- Listed height: 6 ft 4 in (1.93 m)
- Listed weight: 241 lb (109 kg)

Career information
- High school: Houston (TX) Spring Branch
- College: Oklahoma
- NFL draft: 1980: 5th round, 130th overall pick

Career history
- Chicago Bears (1980)

Awards and highlights
- First-team All-Big Eight (1979); Second-team All-Big Eight (1978)

Career NFL statistics
- Games played: 16
- Stats at Pro Football Reference

Paul Carrol Tabor (born November 30, 1956) is an American former professional football player who was a center and guard for the Chicago Bears of the National Football League (NFL) in 1980. He played college football for the Oklahoma Sooners. He is the identical twin brother of former NFL player Phil Tabor.
