= Chris Garlich =

American football player (born 1957)

No. 60, 61
- Position: Linebacker

Personal information
- Born: July 17, 1957 (age 69); St. Louis, Missouri, U.S.
- Listed height: 6 ft 1 in (1.85 m)
- Listed weight: 220 lb (100 kg)

Career information
- High school: Kansas City (MO) Rockhurst
- College: Missouri
- NFL draft: 1979: undrafted

Career history
- St. Louis Cardinals (1979)

Awards and highlights
- Second-team All-Big Eight (1978)
- Stats at Pro Football Reference

Christopher James Garlich (born July 17, 1957) is an American former professional football player who was a linebacker for the St. Louis Cardinals of the National Football League (NFL) in 1979. He played college football for the Missouri Tigers.

== Career ==
He played for Rockhurst HS as a fullback/linebacker and was also a high jumper. He became All-State in 1974 and All-Midlands team by Big Eight magazine. In November 1974 he sustained a knee injury and underwent surgery. He became again a 4A All-state offensive team and an All-American.

In February 1975 he committed to Missouri University. He lettered all his four years at Missouri. In September 1976 he became defensive player of the week in the Big Eight Conference. In 1978 he became co-captain of the Tigers together with center Pete Allard.

Garlich signed as an undrafted free agent in June 1979 with the St. Louis Cardinals. He was cut in August 1979 by the Cardinals. In October 1979 he signed again with the Cardinals. Garlich appeared in nine games for the Cardinals during the 1979 season. He retired after one season in the NFL.
