= 1977 All-Big Eight Conference football team =

American all-star college football team

The 1977 All-Big Eight Conference football team consists of American football players chosen by various organizations for All-Big Eight Conference teams for the 1977 NCAA Division I football season. The selectors for the 1977 season included the Associated Press (AP) and United Press International (UPI).

== Offensive selections ==
=== Quarterbacks ===
- Thomas Lott, Oklahoma (AP-1; UPI-1)
- Jeff Knapple, Colorado (AP-2)

=== Running backs ===
- Terry Miller, Oklahoma State (AP-1; UPI-1)
- Dexter Green, Iowa State (AP-1; UPI-1)
- I. M. Hipp, Nebraska (AP-1; UPI-1)
- James Mayberry, Colorado (AP-2)
- Rick Berns, Nebraska (AP-2)
- Elvis Peacock, Oklahoma (AP-2)

=== Tight ends ===
- Kellen Winslow, Missouri (AP-1; UPI-1)
- Ken Spaeth, Nebraska (AP-2)

=== Centers ===
- Tom Davis, Nebraska (AP-1; UPI-1)

=== Offensive guards ===
- Greg Jorgensen, Nebraska (AP-1; UPI-1)
- Greg Roberts, Oklahoma (AP-1)
- Jaime Melendez, Oklahoma (AP-2)
- Steve Lindquist, Nebraska (AP-2)

=== Offensive tackles ===
- Karl Baldischwiler, Oklahoma (AP-1; UPI-1)
- James Taylor, Missouri (AP-1; UPI-1)
- Kelvin Clark, Nebraska (AP-2)
- Lindsey Mason, Kansas (AP-2)

=== Wide receivers ===
- Joe Stewart, Missouri (AP-1; UPI-1)
- Charley Green, Kansas State (AP-2)

== Defensive selections ==
=== Defensive ends ===
- Randy Westendorf, Colorado (AP-1; UPI-1)
- Daria Butler, Oklahoma State (AP-1; UPI-1)
- Steve Hamilton, Missouri (AP-2)
- Tom Dinkel, Kansas (AP-2)

=== Defensive tackles ===
- Tom Randall, Iowa State (AP-1; UPI-1)
- Mike Stensrud, Iowa State (AP-1; UPI-1)
- Phil Tabor, Oklahoma (AP-2)
- Jim Matthews, Missouri (AP-2)

=== Nose guards ===
- Reggie Kinlaw, Oklahoma (AP-1; UPI-1)
- Ron McFarland, Iowa State (AP-2)

=== Linebackers ===
- Darryl Hunt, Oklahoma (AP-1; UPI-1)
- Gary Spani, Kansas State (AP-1)
- George Cumby, Oklahoma (AP-1)
- Tom Boskey, Iowa State (AP-2)
- Brian Cabral, Colorado (AP-2)
- Lee Kunz, Nebraska (AP-2)

=== Defensive backs ===
- Zac Henderson, Oklahoma (AP-1; UPI-1)
- Odis McKinney, Oklahoma (AP-1)
- Tom Fitch, Kansas (AP-1)
- Russ Calabrese, Missouri (AP-2; UPI-1)
- Kevin Hart, Iowa State (UPI-1)
- Ted Harvey, Nebraska (AP-2)
- Terry Peters, Oklahoma (AP-2)

== Special teams ==
=== Placekicker ===
- Uwe von Schamann, Oklahoma (UPI-1)

=== Punter ===
- Rick Blabolil, Iowa State (UPI-1)

=== Return specialist ===
- Fred Nixon, Oklahoma (UPI-1)

== Key ==
AP = Associated Press

UPI = United Press International

== See also ==
- 1977 College Football All-America Team
