= Kelvin Clark =

American football player (born 1956)

No. 73, 78
- Positions: Offensive tackle, guard

Personal information
- Born: January 30, 1956 (age 70); Odessa, Texas, U.S.
- Listed height: 6 ft 3 in (1.91 m)
- Listed weight: 260 lb (118 kg)

Career information
- High school: Odessa (TX)
- College: Nebraska
- NFL draft: 1979: 1st round, 22nd overall pick

Career history
- Denver Broncos (1979–1981); New Orleans Saints (1982–1985)

Awards and highlights
- Consensus All-American (1978); First-team All-Big Eight (1978); Second-team All-Big Eight (1977)

Career NFL statistics
- Games played: 88
- Games started: 25
- Fumble recoveries: 1
- Stats at Pro Football Reference

Kelvin Wayne Clark (born January 30, 1956) is an American former professional football player who was an offensive lineman in the National Football League (NFL) for seven seasons in the 1970s and 1980s. He played college football for the University of Nebraska–Lincoln, and was recognized as a consensus All-American. A first-round pick in the 1979 NFL draft, Clark played professionally for the Denver Broncos and New Orleans Saints of the NFL.

Clark was born in Odessa, Texas.
