= Carroll Zaruba =

American football player (1933–2001)

No. 46
- Position: Cornerback

Personal information
- Born: December 30, 1933; Fullerton, Nebraska, U.S.
- Died: May 20, 2001 (aged 67); Sterling, Colorado, U.S.
- Listed height: 5 ft 9 in (1.75 m)
- Listed weight: 210 lb (95 kg)

Career information
- High school: Fullerton
- College: Nebraska

Career history
- Dallas Texans (1960)
- Stats at Pro Football Reference

Carroll Robert Zaruba (December 30, 1933 – May 10, 2001) was an American professional football cornerback who played for the Dallas Texans of the American Football League (AFL). He played college football for the Nebraska Cornhuskers as a fullback.

== Early life ==
Carroll Robert Zaruba was born on December 30, 1933, in Fullerton, Nebraska. He grew up on a farm. He attended Fullerton High School.

== College career ==
Zaruba played one year at Doane College before serving in the United States Marine Corps in Korea. In 1956, he transferred to the University of Nebraska to play for the Cornhuskers. He had to sit out the 1956 season due to NCAA transfer rules and was then a three-year letterman from 1957 to 1959 as a fullback. Zaruba rushed for 132 yards in 1957, 164 yards in 1958, and a team-leading 463 yards in 1959. He never scored a rushing touchdown. He caught four career passes for 55 yards and two touchdowns, and led the team in receiving touchdown in 1959 with two.

== Professional career ==
Zaruba was selected by the Dallas Texans in the first selections portion of the 1960 American Football League draft. He played in seven games, all starts at cornerback, for the Texans during their inaugural 1960 season.

== Personal life ==
In 1972, Zaruba and his wife moved to Omaha, Nebraska, where he worked for Lowery Trucking. In 1978, they moved to Fullerton, where he owned Pappy's Station until 1993. He died on May 10, 2001, in Sterling, Colorado. Zaruba was working a truck driver at the time of his death.

== See also ==
- Nebraska Cornhuskers football yearly statistical leaders
