= Rod Horn =

American football player (born 1956)

No. 71
- Position: Defensive tackle

Personal information
- Born: November 23, 1956 (age 69); Fresno, California, U.S.
- Listed height: 6 ft 4 in (1.93 m)
- Listed weight: 268 lb (122 kg)

Career information
- High school: Herbert Hoover (Fresno)
- College: Nebraska
- NFL draft: 1980: 3rd round, 59th overall pick

Career history
- Cincinnati Bengals (1980-1981)

Awards and highlights
- 2× First-team All-Big Eight (1978, 1979)

Career NFL statistics
- Games played: 23
- Games started: 4
- Stats at Pro Football Reference

Rodney Lee Horn (born November 23, 1956) is an American former professional football player who was a defensive tackle in the National Football League (NFL). He was selected by the Cincinnati Bengals in the third round of the 1980 NFL draft. Horn played college football for the Nebraska Cornhuskers.
