= Carel Stith =

American football player (born 1945)

No. 70
- Positions: Defensive tackle, Defensive end

Personal information
- Born: May 24, 1945 (age 81); Lincoln, Nebraska, U.S.
- Listed height: 6 ft 5 in (1.96 m)
- Listed weight: 270 lb (122 kg)

Career information
- High school: Lincoln Southeast
- College: Nebraska (1963-1966)
- NFL draft: 1967: 4th round, 86th overall pick

Career history
- Houston Oilers (1967-1969)

Awards and highlights
- First-team All-Big Eight (1966)

Career AFL statistics
- Fumble recoveries: 1
- Sacks: 1
- Stats at Pro Football Reference

Carel Stith (born May 24, 1945) is an American former professional football player who was a defensive tackle and defensive end for the Houston Oilers of the American Football League (AFL) from 1967 to 1969. He played college football for the Nebraska Cornhuskers. Stith currently lives in Houston and is an attorney.
