= Jerry Murtaugh =

- Murtaugh in 1970

No. 42
- Position: Linebacker

Personal information
- Born: April 30, 1948 (age 78); Omaha, Nebraska, USA
- Listed height: 6 ft 3 in (1.91 m)
- Listed weight: 212 lb (96 kg)

Career information
- High school: Omaha North
- College: Nebraska

Awards and highlights
- National champion (1970); First-team All-American (1970); 2x All-Big Eight (1969), (1970)

Jerry "Rat" Murtaugh (born April 30, 1948) was an American college football linebacker for the Nebraska Cornhuskers who was named a first-team All-American in 1970.

Murtaugh was a co-captain of Nebraska's 1970 national championship team, which defeated LSU in the 1971 Orange Bowl to cap an 11–0–1 season.

== Biography ==
=== Early life ===
Jerry Murtaugh was born April 30, 1948, in Omaha, Nebraska.

Murtaugh attended Omaha North High School, where he was a star wrestler, winning a Nebraska state wrestling championship. He also was an outfielder on the school baseball team, and played fullback and linebacker for the North High football squad.

=== Collegiate career ===
Murtaugh started for the powerful Cornhuskers team as a sophomore in 1968 and garnered honors as a unanimous All Big-Eight selection during his 1969 junior season. As a junior he broke All-American Wayne Meylan's school record for tackles with 126.

He entered his 1970 senior season highly touted, being named to the Playboy magazine and Football News preseason All-America teams.

The 1970 Nebraska team was loaded with talent, including in addition to Murtaugh future Heisman Trophy winner Johnny Rodgers, running back Jeff Kinney, and quarterback Jerry Tagge, a 1972 first round draft pick of the Green Bay Packers. Ahead of the season co-captain Murtaugh attracted attention with a Joe Namath-like "guarantee" that the Cornhuskers would finish the 1970 season undefeated.

Murtaugh later recalled his September 1970 encounter with the 35 members of the press seeking flavorful news copy. "A bunch of reporters around, and they just asked me, bluntly: 'How do you think you're going to do?' And I just told them — I said, 'We're going to win it all — nobody's going to beat us.'"

The 1970 team ultimately put their money where Murtaugh's mouth was, running the table to finish 11–0–1 — culminating with a 17–15 win on New Year's Day over the LSU Tigers and a first national title for the scarlet-and-white.

=== Life after football ===
During the 2000s, Murtaugh assumed the unofficial role of coordinator of the Nebraska football program's alumni and fans of the team from around the country. Working with the school's outreach director and president of the booster club, Murtaugh constructed and maintained a database of former players and their contact information with a view to coordinating speaking engagements for the players and bringing them to closer connection with the university and its athletics program.

As of 2024, Murtaugh still stands as #2 on Nebraska's all-time tackles list, with 342, despite having had only three years of varsity football eligibility in accordance with NCAA rules of the day.
