= Fran Nagle =

American football player and coach (1924–2014)

Biographical details
- Born: July 1, 1924; Lynn, Massachusetts, U.S.
- Died: August 15, 2014 (aged 90); Madison, Wisconsin, U.S.

Playing career
- 1947–1948: Massachusetts State College–Fort Devens
- 1949–1950: Nebraska
- 1951: Philadelphia Eagles
- 1952: Montreal Alouettes
- Position: Quarterback

Coaching career (HC unless noted)
- 1953–1954: Doane

Head coaching record
- Overall: 6–10–2

Francis Joseph Nagle (July 1, 1924 – August 15, 2014) was an American football player, coach, and professor.

== Early life ==
Nagle graduated from high school in West Lynn, Massachusetts, and served in the United States Army Air Corps in World War II. A radio operator, Nagle's B-24 bomber was shot down on his first mission and he became a prisoner of war during the last three months of the conflict.

== Playing career ==
He initially attended Massachusetts State College–Fort Devens (a temporary two-year college and campus for military veterans) from 1947 to 1948 and became the school's starting quarterback despite never having playing football before. In 1949, Nagle followed his coach, Bob Davis, to the University of Nebraska–Lincoln. As a quarterback at Nebraska, Nagle was the statistical leader for passing yards from 1949 and 1950. He holds a career Nebraska top 25 passing record at 1,289 yards in 190 attempts with 41.6% completions and 13 touchdowns. Nagle was the 43rd pick in the fourth round National Football League draft pick as a back for the Philadelphia Eagles in 1951. In 1952, he was signed by the Montreal Alouettes of the Canadian Football League but a training camp injury ended his career.

=== Honors ===
In 1950, Nagle was chosen as a Big Seven Conference All-Conference selection. In 1951, Nagle played in the Senior Bowl, the College All-Star game, and the East-West Shrine Game. Nagle was inducted into the Nebraska Football Hall of Fame in 1992.

== Coaching career ==
Nagle was the 25th head football coach at Doane College in Crete, Nebraska, and he held that position for two seasons, from 1953 and 1954. His coaching record at Doane was 6–10–2.

=== Head coaching record ===
Year	Team	Overall	Conference	Standing	Bowl/playoffs
Doane Tigers (Nebraska College Conference) (1953–1954)
1953	Doane	4–3–2	3–2–2	T–4th	
1954	Doane	2–7	2–5	6th	
Doane:		6–10–2	5–7–2		
Total:		6–10–2			

== Later life ==
Nagle would go on to receive his PhD in physiology at the University of Oklahoma Health Sciences Center in 1966 and would teach physiology at the University of Wisconsin-Madison. Nagle died on August 15, 2014, at the age of 90.
