= Dave Theisen =

American gridiron football player (1941–2014)

David L. Theisen (September 9, 1941 – December 9, 2014) was a professional sportsman who played both American football and Canadian football, for the Los Angeles Rams, the Toronto Argonauts, and the Winnipeg Blue Bombers.
