= Clint Finley =

American football player (born 1977)

No. 38
- Position: Safety

Personal information
- Born: March 27, 1977 (age 49); Andrews, Texas, U.S.
- Listed height: 6 ft 0 in (1.83 m)
- Listed weight: 210 lb (95 kg)

Career information
- High school: Cuero (TX)
- College: Nebraska
- NFL draft: 2001: undrafted

Career history
- Dallas Cowboys (2001)*; Kansas City Chiefs (2002–2004); → Berlin Thunder (2003); Dallas Cowboys (2005)*
- * Offseason or practice squad member only

Awards and highlights
- National champion (1997)

Career NFL statistics
- Games played: 4
- Tackles: 1
- Stats at Pro Football Reference

Clint Cade Finley (born March 27, 1977) is an American former professional football player who was a safety for two seasons with the Kansas City Chiefs of the National Football League (NFL). He played college football for the Nebraska Cornhuskers.

== Early life ==
Finley was born on March 27, 1977, in Andrews, Texas, and attended Cuero High School.

== College career ==
Finley went to college at Nebraska, playing safety. In 1996 he was redshirted. In 1997 he played in 9 games and had 14 tackles. In 1998 he had 28 tackles and had 3 interceptions, one which he returned for a touchdown against Colorado. In 1999 he played in 12 games and had 27 tackles, he also had one interception. He played in 11 games in 2000 and had 22 tackles but no interceptions.

College Awards and Honors

- 1998 Honorable-Mention Academic All-Big 12
- Big 12 Commissioner's Spring Academic Honor Roll (1999)
- Big 12 Commissioner's Spring Academic Honor Roll (2001)

== Professional career ==
Dallas Cowboys

Clint was originally signed as an undrafted free agent by the Dallas Cowboys in 2001, but did not make the final roster.

Kansas City Chiefs

On February 20, 2002, Finley was signed by the Kansas City Chiefs and was released on September 1, 2002. The next day he was signed to the Chiefs practice squad. In 2002 he played in one game and had one tackle. On December 27, he signed a three-year contract. On February 5, he was sent to the Berlin Thunder where after the offseason with the thunder he was signed to the practice squad. He was promoted to the active roster two days later, released again a week later and signed to the practice squad again two days later. On October 8, he was released from the practice squad and was signed again on December 10. In 2003 he played in 3 games but did not make the roster in 2004.

Berlin Thunder

On February 5, 2003, he was sent to the Berlin Thunder of NFL Europe where he played in all ten games that season, recording 57 tackles.

Dallas Cowboys (second stint)

On April 7, 2005, he was signed by the Dallas Cowboys and was released in June. After being released he did not play another NFL game.

== Later life ==
From 2010 to 2015 Finley served as Athletic Director/Head Football Coach at Los Fresnos CISD. Finley’s team made the playoffs each of those years. He later served as Athletic Director/Head Football Coach at Big Spring ISD. Finley is currently serving as the Athletic Director/Head Football Coach for Sealy High School in South Texas.
