= Joe Walker (defensive back) =

American football player (born 1977)

No. 29, 20
- Position: Safety

Personal information
- Born: March 19, 1977 (age 49); Memphis, Tennessee, U.S.

Career information
- College: Nebraska
- NFL draft: 2001: undrafted

Career history
- Tennessee Titans (2001); Indianapolis Colts (2002)

Awards and highlights
- National champion (1997); Second-team All-Big 12 (1998)

Career NFL statistics
- Total tackles: 29
- Fumble recoveries: 1
- Stats at Pro Football Reference

Joe Walker (born March 19, 1977) is an American former professional football player who was a safety in the National Football League (NFL). He played college football for the Nebraska Cornhuskers. He played for the Tennessee Titans in 2001 and for the Indianapolis Colts in 2002.

A dangerous return man and two-year starter in the Husker secondary, Joe Walker owns the school record for most kickoff returns with 53 and ranks second all-time at Nebraska with 1,159 kickoff return yards, finishing 284 yards behind school record holder Tyrone Hughes (1,443 from 1989 to 1992). He tied the Nebraska record for most career interception returns for TDs with three (one each in 1997, 1998, and 2000), and tied an NCAA record for scoring on a kickoff, punt and interception return in the same season (1998). Walker also ranks eighth all-time at Nebraska with 653 punt return yards, giving him 1,972 return yards and five return TDs. Walker posted 132 career tackles, 14 tackles for loss, 12 career pass breakups and seven interceptions. Playing in 45 games, missing just three, Walker had 18 career starts, including 10 in 2000. As a senior, he recorded a career-high 44 tackles and broke up nine passes
