= Kenny Bell =

American football player (born 1992)

No. 80
- Position: Wide receiver

Personal information
- Born: February 25, 1992 (age 34); Boulder, Colorado, U.S.
- Listed height: 6 ft 1 in (1.85 m)
- Listed weight: 188 lb (85 kg)

Career information
- High school: Fairview (Boulder)
- College: Nebraska
- NFL draft: 2015: 5th round, 162nd overall pick

Career history
- Tampa Bay Buccaneers (2015); Baltimore Ravens (2016–2017)*; Denver Broncos (2018)*; Salt Lake Stallions (2019)
- * Offseason or practice squad member only

Awards and highlights
- First-team All-Big Ten (2014); Second-team All-Big Ten (2012)
- Stats at Pro Football Reference

Kenny Bell (born February 25, 1992) is an American former professional football player who was a wide receiver in the National Football League (NFL). He played college football for the Nebraska Cornhuskers and was selected by the Tampa Bay Buccaneers in the fifth round of the 2015 NFL draft.

== Early life ==
Bell attended Fairview High School in Boulder, Colorado, where he was a three-sport star in football, track and basketball. In football, Bell helped Fairview High to a 12–1 record and a state semi-final appearance in 2009. As a junior, Bell earned first-team All-Front Range League honors, playing wingback and rushing for 958 yards and 12 touchdowns. As a senior, Bell caught 18 passes for 328 yards and three touchdowns, and added an interception and kickoff return for a touchdown. He missed much of the season with an injury, but scored five touchdowns in his first five games back in action. Despite his limited action, Bell's impact was recognized, as he was a first-team All-Colorado selection and first-team Class 5A All-state pick by The Denver Post. In basketball, Bell helped his team to the state title game as a senior.

Also a standout track & field athlete, Bell was one of the state's top performers in both the sprinting and jumping events. In the long jump, he posted a personal-best leap of 7.62 meters (24–9), while in the high jump he had a best of 2.02 meters (6–7.25). He also ran the 100-meter dash in 10.8 seconds.

Bell was ranked among the top 10 players in the state of Colorado, and was rated as a three-star recruit by Rivals.com. Bell committed to play college football at Nebraska after also visiting Minnesota and Texas Tech. He also had offers from several other schools, including Colorado, Cal, Arizona and Arizona State.

== College career ==
Bell attended Nebraska from 2010 to 2014. As a freshman, he was redshirted. As a redshirt freshman in 2011, he played in all 13 games making 11 starts. He led the team with 32 receptions for 461 yards and three touchdowns. He became the second freshman in school history to lead the team in these categories. As a sophomore in 2012, Bell started all 14 games and again led the team with 50 receptions for 863 yards and eight touchdowns. As a junior, he played in all 13 games and for the third straight year led the team with 52 receptions for 577 yards and four touchdowns.

Bell set numerous Nebraska records his senior season in 2014. Against Rutgers he broke the career receptions record which had been held by Nate Swift. A few weeks later against Wisconsin he broke Johnny Rodgers career receiving yards record. He played in all 13 games that year and for the fourth straight season he led the team in receiving, becoming the first player in school history to do so all four years. Bell earned first-team All-Big Ten Conference honors after recording 47 receptions for 788 yards with six touchdowns. Bell started 49-of-53 games played at the University of Nebraska, finishing his career ranked first in school history in receptions (181) and receiving yards (2,689) as well as third in receiving touchdowns (21). He made the most starts on offense (49) in school history and posted 51 kickoff returns for 1,277 yards (25.0 avg.) with one touchdown during his career.

== Professional career ==
Pre-draft measurables
Height	Weight	Arm length	Hand span	40-yard dash	10-yard split	20-yard split	20-yard shuttle	Three-cone drill	Vertical jump	Broad jump	Bench press
6 ft 1 1/8 in (1.86 m)	197 lb (89 kg)	31 5/8 in (0.80 m)	9 1/4 in (0.23 m)	4.38 s	1.47 s	2.54 s	4.15 s	6.66 s	41.5 in (1.05 m)	10 ft 9 in (3.28 m)	7 reps
All values from NFL Combine except 40 yd dash from Nebraska Pro Day

=== Tampa Bay Buccaneers ===
The Tampa Bay Buccaneers selected Bell in the fifth round of the 2015 NFL draft at pick 162, using the pick they acquired from the Baltimore Ravens in exchange for Jeremy Zuttah. He spent the 2015 season on the Buccaneers' injured reserve list following a preseason hamstring injury; he did not have any catches in the first two preseason games. On September 3, 2016, he was released by the Buccaneers as part of final roster cuts.

=== Baltimore Ravens ===
On October 5, 2016, Bell was signed to the Ravens' practice squad. He signed a reserve/future contract with the Ravens on January 2, 2017.

On August 18, 2017, Bell was waived/injured by the Ravens and placed on injured reserve. He was released on August 20, 2017. He was re-signed to the Ravens' practice squad on October 24, 2017.

=== Denver Broncos ===
On January 17, 2018, Bell signed a reserve/future contract with the Denver Broncos. He was waived/injured on August 3, 2018, and was placed on injured reserve. He was released four days later.

=== Salt Lake Stallions ===
In October 2018, Bell joined the Salt Lake Stallions of the Alliance of American Football. The league ceased operations in April 2019.

== Personal life ==
His father, Ken Bell, played for the Broncos from 1986 to 1989, totaling more than 2,000 career yards in kickoff returns.

He is canonically included in the Better Call Saul series Season 6 Episode 10.
