= Terrence Nunn =

American gridiron football player (born 1986)

No. 83
- Position: Wide receiver

Personal information
- Born: July 25, 1986 (age 40); Houston, Texas, U.S.
- Listed height: 6 ft 0 in (1.83 m)
- Listed weight: 195 lb (88 kg)

Career information
- High school: Houston (TX) Cypress Falls
- College: Nebraska
- NFL draft: 2008: undrafted

Career history
- New England Patriots (2009)*; Tampa Bay Buccaneers (2009); Saskatchewan Roughriders (2011)
- * Offseason or practice squad member only

Terrence Nunn (born July 25, 1986) is an American former football wide receiver. He most recently played for the Saskatchewan Roughriders of the Canadian Football League (CFL). He was signed by the New England Patriots as a street free agent in 2009. He played college football at Nebraska.

Nunn has also played for the Tampa Bay Buccaneers.

== Early life ==
Nunn attended Cypress Falls High School in Harris County, Texas, where he played football and track and field. He was a two-time all-district selection, and the team's MVP in his 2003 senior season. He caught 27 passes for 623 yards as a junior and 34 passes for 471 yards as a senior.

== College career ==
After graduating high school, Nunn attended the University of Nebraska–Lincoln, where he played in 11 games as a true freshman, starting six. He finished the year with 16 catches for 218 yards. In 2005 Nunn started all 12 games, recording 43 receptions, a career-high, for 495 yards and seven touchdowns, also a career-high. He caught 42 balls in nine starts as a junior while also leading the team in punt returns. As a senior in 2007, Nunn started 10 of 12 games, picking up 452 yards on 35 catches. He ranks third all-time at Nebraska in career receiving yards (1,762) and career receptions (136).

== Professional career ==
=== New England Patriots ===
Nunn went undrafted in the 2008 NFL draft and spent the season out of football. He was signed by the New England Patriots on May 11, 2009, after a tryout. He had eight catches for 133 yards in the preseason, but was waived on September 5 during final cuts. He was re-signed to the team's practice squad the next day.

=== Tampa Bay Buccaneers ===
On November 23, 2009 Nunn was signed off the Patriots' practice squad by the Tampa Bay Buccaneers. However, he was waived on August 31, 2010.

=== Saskatchewan Roughriders ===
Nunn was signed by the Roughriders on March 8, 2011. Nunn had an unproductive and disappointing 2011 season, he was cut on Jan. 12, 2012.
