= Javin Wright =

American football player (born 2000)

No. 48 – Tampa Bay Buccaneers
- Position: Linebacker
- Roster status: Practice squad

Personal information
- Born: March 19, 2000 (age 26)
- Listed height: 6 ft 4 in (1.93 m)
- Listed weight: 232 lb (105 kg)

Career information
- High school: Hamilton (Chandler, Arizona)
- College: Nebraska (2019–2025)
- NFL draft: 2026: undrafted

Career history
- Tampa Bay Buccaneers (2026–present)*
- * Offseason or practice squad member only
- Stats at Pro Football Reference

Javin Wright (born March 19, 2000) is an American professional football linebacker for the Tampa Bay Buccaneers of the National Football League (NFL). He played college football for the Nebraska Cornhuskers.

== Early life ==
Wright attended Hamilton High School in Chandler, Arizona, and committed to play college football for the Nebraska Cornhuskers.

== College career ==
As a freshman in 2019 Wright was redshirted. He missed the entire 2020 season due to injury. In 2021, he played just one game before being diagnosed with blood clots, forcing him to miss the rest of the season. Wright returned for the 2022 season, playing in 10 games with one start. In week 12 of the 2023, season, he notched eight tackles, a forced fumble and an interception in a loss to Maryland. During the 2023 season, Wright recorded 51 tackles and two interceptions. In 2024, he tallied 34 tackles. In his final season in 2025, Wright totaled 86 tackles, three sacks, and an interception. After the season he declared for the NFL draft and accepted an invite to the 2026 American Bowl.

== Professional career ==
Pre-draft measurables
Height	Weight	Arm length	Hand span	Wingspan	40-yard dash	10-yard split	20-yard split	20-yard shuttle	Three-cone drill	Vertical jump	Broad jump	Bench press
6 ft 4 in (1.93 m)	232 lb (105 kg)	32 7/8 in (0.84 m)	10 in (0.25 m)	6 ft 8 1/4 in (2.04 m)	4.61 s	1.59 s	2.62 s	4.25 s	6.75 s	35.5 in (0.90 m)	10 ft 0 in (3.05 m)	12 reps
All values from Pro Day

After not being selected in the 2026 NFL draft, Wright signed with the Tampa Bay Buccaneers as an undrafted free agent. Wright was waived by the Buccaneers as a part of final roster cuts on August 30; he was re-signed to the team's practice squad the following day.

== Personal life ==
Wright is the son of former NFL safety Toby Wright. His uncle, Terry Wright, also played in the NFL for the Indianapolis Colts.
