= Quincy Enunwa =

American football player (born 1992)

No. 82, 81
- Position: Wide receiver

Personal information
- Born: May 31, 1992 (age 34); Moreno Valley, California, U.S.
- Listed height: 6 ft 2 in (1.88 m)
- Listed weight: 225 lb (102 kg)

Career information
- High school: Rancho Verde (Moreno Valley)
- College: Nebraska
- NFL draft: 2014: 6th round, 209th overall pick

Career history
- New York Jets (2014–2019)

Career NFL statistics
- Games played: 41
- Receptions: 119
- Receiving yards: 1,617
- Receiving touchdowns: 5
- Stats at Pro Football Reference

Onochie Quincy Enunwa (born May 31, 1992) is an American former professional football player who was a wide receiver in the National Football League (NFL). He played college football for the Nebraska Cornhuskers, and he was selected by the New York Jets in the sixth round of the 2014 NFL draft.

== Early life ==
Enunwa attended Rancho Verde High School in Moreno Valley, California. He was selected All-Inland Valley League first-team in high school. He played football and ran track. As a senior, he caught 40 passes for more than 600 yards and 15 touchdowns. He was selected and played in the Inland Empire All-Star Game while in high school.

In addition to football, he competed as a jumper on the school's track & field team. He finished sixth in the triple jump at the 2009 CIF-Southern Meet, setting a personal-best leap of 13.79 meters. He won the high jump at the 2010 Rancho Verde Relays of Champions, with a career-best jump of 2.06 meters.

== College career ==
Enunwa was named to the Nebraska Scholar-Athlete Honor Roll in his junior season. He was selected as the 2014 TaxSlayer.com Gator Bowl MVP and was also the Nebraska Offensive MVP in his senior season. In the 2013 season, Enunwa broke Heisman Trophy winner Johnny Rodgers's school record for most touchdown receptions in a season, catching 12 touchdowns in his senior year. At the 2014 TaxSlayer.com Gator Bowl, Enunwa broke the Nebraska school record for longest reception, by scoring a touchdown on a 99-yard reception from quarterback Tommy Armstrong Jr. in the third quarter. His 12 receiving touchdowns in 2013 led the Big Ten.

In his time with Nebraska, Enunwa recorded 115 receptions for 1,526 receiving yards and 15 receiving touchdowns in four years.

=== College statistics ===
Quincy Enunwa		Receiving				
Year	School	G	Rec	Yds	Avg	TD
2010	Nebraska	10	1	10	10.0	0
2011	Nebraska	13	21	293	14.0	2
2012	Nebraska	14	42	470	11.2	1
2013	Nebraska	12	51	753	14.8	12
Career	Nebraska	49	115	1,526	13.3	15

== Professional career ==
Pre-draft measurables
Height	Weight	Arm length	Hand span	40-yard dash	10-yard split	20-yard split	Bench press
6 ft 2 in (1.88 m)	225 lb (102 kg)	32 5/8 in (0.83 m)	9 1/2 in (0.24 m)	4.45 s	1.56 s	2.50 s	19 reps
All values from NFL Combine

The New York Jets selected Enunwa in the sixth round (209th overall) of the 2014 NFL draft on May 10, 2014.

On May 15, 2014, the New York Jets signed Enunwa to a four-year, $2.29 million contract that includes a signing bonus of $78,680.

He was released by the team on September 1, 2014 and signed to the team's practice squad a day later. Enunwa was promoted to the active roster on December 27. During his rookie year in 2014, Enunwa played in only one game, which was in Week 17 against the Miami Dolphins, and played mainly on special teams.

On October 19, 2015, Enunwa was suspended for four games of the 2015 season without pay due to violating the NFL player conduct policy. On November 21, Enunwa was re-activated from his suspension. During the 2015 season, he played in 12 games and recorded 315 receiving yards.

With the Jets being short-handed on tight ends in 2016, the team announced that Enunwa would be the slot receiver and an end-around sweep specialist. In 2016, Enunwa has had a breakout year filling in for the injured wide receiver Eric Decker, coming second in receptions, yards, and touchdown receptions on the team. Enunwa posted a quality performance on Thursday Night Football in Week 2 against the Buffalo Bills on September 15, 2016, when he had six receptions for 92 yards in the 37–31 victory. Enunwa had a great third season, having totals of 58 catches, 857 yards, and four touchdowns.

On August 7, 2017, Enunwa was placed on injured reserve with a neck injury. It was eventually revealed that Enunwa was diagnosed with bulging discs in his neck, and that aftermath of surgery could require from six to nine months to recover.

Enunwa returned healthy in 2018, recording 38 receptions for 449 yards and one touchdown. He was placed on injured reserve on December 29, 2018. On December 28, 2018, Enunwa signed a four-year, $36 million contract extension with the Jets through the 2022 season.

On September 11, 2019, it was announced that Enunwa would miss the remainder of the season after suffering a neck injury in the first quarter of the Jets' season-opening loss to the Buffalo Bills. On May 5, 2020, the Jets announced that Enunwa would miss the entire 2020 season and was placed on the reserve/physically unable to perform (PUP) list. He was released from the reserve/PUP list with a failed physical designation on August 3.

== Post-playing career ==
After retiring from football, Enunwa became a media analyst for the Jets.
