= Lee Kunz =

American football player (born 1957)

No. 57
- Position: Linebacker

Personal information
- Born: May 21, 1957 (age 69); Golden, Colorado, U.S.
- Listed height: 6 ft 2 in (1.88 m)
- Listed weight: 226 lb (103 kg)

Career information
- High school: Wheat Ridge (Wheat Ridge, Colorado)
- College: Nebraska
- NFL draft: 1979: 7th round, 174th overall pick

Career history
- Chicago Bears (1979–1981)

Awards and highlights
- 2× Second-team All-Big Eight (1977, 1978)

Career NFL statistics
- Games played: 48
- Stats at Pro Football Reference

Lee Roy Kunz (born April 21, 1957) is an American former professional football player who was a linebacker for three seasons with the Chicago Bears of the National Football League (NFL).

He played college football for the Nebraska Cornhuskers. He also competed for the Nebraska Cornhuskers track and field team as a discus thrower.

He played every game during his three seasons in the NFL.
