= Barrett Ruud =

American football player and coach (born 1983)

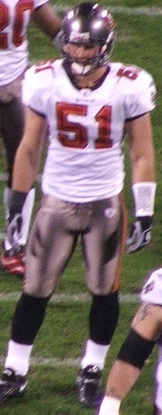
- Ruud with the Tampa Bay Buccaneers in 2006

Atlanta Falcons
- Title: Inside linebackers coach

Personal information
- Born: May 20, 1983 (age 43); Lincoln, Nebraska, U.S.
- Listed height: 6 ft 2 in (1.88 m)
- Listed weight: 241 lb (109 kg)

Career information
- Position: Linebacker (No. 51, 55, 54)
- High school: Lincoln Southeast
- College: Nebraska (2001–2004)
- NFL draft: 2005: 2nd round, 36th overall pick

Career history

Playing
- Tampa Bay Buccaneers (2005–2010); Tennessee Titans (2011); Seattle Seahawks (2012)*; New Orleans Saints (2012); Houston Texans (2012)
- * Offseason or practice squad member only

Coaching
- Nebraska (2018–2022) Inside linebackers coach; Atlanta Falcons (2024–present) Inside linebackers coach

Operations
- UCF (2016–2017) Quality control administrator

Awards and highlights
- Third-team All-American (2004); First-team All-Big 12 (2004)

Career NFL statistics
- Total tackles: 657
- Sacks: 6
- Forced fumbles: 7
- Fumble recoveries: 5
- Interceptions: 7
- Stats at Pro Football Reference

Barrett James Ruud (born May 20, 1983) is an American football coach who serves as inside linebackers coach for the Atlanta Falcons of the National Football League (NFL). He was selected by the Tampa Bay Buccaneers in the second round of the 2005 NFL draft and also played for the Tennessee Titans, New Orleans Saints, and Houston Texans. He played college football for the Nebraska Cornhuskers, where he was the inside linebackers coach from 2018 to 2022.

== Early life ==
Ruud attended high school at Lincoln Southeast High School in Lincoln, Nebraska. He was a four-year letterman and a two-time all-state honorable mention selection in basketball. He helped his team compile a 48–2 record and Class A state titles in 1998, 1999, and 2001. He was a two-time All-American by the Omaha World-Herald and earned All-American honors as a linebacker from Prep Star and Student Sport. Ruud also played halfback and set school career records with 2,988 rushing yards and 54 touchdowns. He also was a two-time super-state pick and was named offensive player of the year, defensive player of the year and prep athlete of the year by the Lincoln Journal Star.

Ruud's great-grandfather Clarence Swanson played college football for Nebraska from 1918 to 1921 and is an inductee of the College Football Hall of Fame.

== College career ==
Ruud played college football at the University of Nebraska–Lincoln becoming a third-generation Husker football player in the process. He earned numerous honors while there including 2004 Third-team All American, 2004 First-team All-Big 12, 2003 Second-team All-Big 12, and 2002 All-Big 12 honorable mention among others. He finished his career starting 37 of 50 games finishing with a school record 432 career tackles.

== Professional career ==
Pre-draft measurables
Height	Weight	Arm length	Hand span	40-yard dash	10-yard split	20-yard split	20-yard shuttle	Three-cone drill	Vertical jump	Broad jump	Bench press
6 ft 2 1/2 in (1.89 m)	241 lb (109 kg)	30 5/8 in (0.78 m)	9 1/4 in (0.23 m)	4.78 s	1.68 s	2.78 s	3.94 s	7.22 s	34.5 in (0.88 m)	9 ft 4 in (2.84 m)	25 reps
All values from NFL Combine

=== Tampa Bay Buccaneers ===
Ruud was selected by the Tampa Bay Buccaneers in the second round of the 2005 NFL draft. As a rookie, he played in all 16 games recording 17 tackles. In 2006, he started 5 of 16 games after injuries to Shelton Quarles and Ryan Nece and finished with 57 tackles.

In 2007 Ruud became a full-time starter after the team cut longtime starter Quarles. He finished the season starting all 15 games he played in, recording 114 tackles and two interceptions. He remained the Buccaneers starter through 2008 and ended the season totaling 137 tackles, three sacks and two interceptions.

=== Tennessee Titans ===
On July 30, 2011, Ruud signed with the Tennessee Titans. On December 13, 2011, Ruud was placed on injured reserve, ending his season.

=== Seattle Seahawks ===
In April 2012, Ruud signed with the Seattle Seahawks.

=== New Orleans Saints ===
On August 20, 2012, Ruud was traded to the New Orleans Saints in exchange for a conditional draft pick. On October 8, 2012, Ruud was cut by the Saints after the team went through a 1–4 start.

=== Houston Texans ===
On October 10, 2012, Ruud was signed by the Houston Texans, to provide depth at linebacker after the injury to defensive star Brian Cushing.

=== NFL statistics ===
Year	Team	GP	Tackles				Fumbles		Interceptions					
Year	Team	GP	Comb	Solo	Ast	Sack	FF	FR	Int	Yds	Avg	Lng	TD	PD
2005	TB	16	17	15	2	0.0	0	1	0	0	0.0	0	0	0
2006	TB	16	57	37	20	0.0	0	0	0	0	0.0	0	0	0
2007	TB	15	114	83	31	0.0	3	3	2	7	3.5	5	0	3
2008	TB	16	137	102	35	3.0	0	1	2	10	5.0	10	0	6
2009	TB	16	142	107	35	0.0	1	0	1	23	23.0	21	0	7
2010	TB	16	118	85	33	2.0	2	0	1	1	1.0	1	0	4
2011	TEN	9	57	40	17	0.0	0	0	1	4	4.0	4	0	3
2012	HOU	9	16	12	4	1.0	0	0	0	0	0.0	0	0	2
Career		113	658	481	177	6.0	6	5	7	45	6.4	21	0	25

== Coaching career ==
Prior to the 2024 season, Ruud was hired to serve as the inside linebackers coach for the Atlanta Falcons under head coach Raheem Morris. He was retained for the 2026 campaign following the hiring of Kevin Stefanski as head coach.

== Personal life ==
Ruud's father, Tom Ruud, played for the Cornhuskers in the early 1970s and later in the National Football League for the Buffalo Bills and Cincinnati Bengals. His younger brother Bo also attended Nebraska.

His mother Jaime Ruud died of a massive heart attack on June 30, 2006, while vacationing with family in northern Minnesota.

Barrett hosts an annual summer football camp at Warner University for children ages 7–18.
