= Calvin Jones (running back) =

American football player (1970–2025)

No. 27, 44
- Position: Halfback

Personal information
- Born: November 27, 1970; Omaha, Nebraska, U.S.
- Died: January 22, 2025 (aged 54); Omaha, Nebraska, U.S.
- Listed height: 5 ft 11 in (1.80 m)
- Listed weight: 205 lb (93 kg)

Career information
- High school: Omaha Central
- College: Nebraska
- NFL draft: 1994: 3rd round, 80th overall pick

Career history
- Los Angeles/Oakland Raiders (1994–1995); Green Bay Packers (1996); Omaha Beef (2000)

Awards and highlights
- Super Bowl champion (XXXI); Third-team All-American (1993); Big Eight Offensive Player of the Year (1992); 2× First-team All-Big Eight (1992, 1993); Second-team All-Big Eight (1991)

Career NFL statistics
- Rushing yards: 112
- Rushing average: 4.1
- Receptions: 2
- Receiving yards: 6
- Stats at Pro Football Reference

Calvin D'Wayne Jones (November 27, 1970 – January 22, 2025) was an American professional football player who was a running back in the National Football League (NFL). He played college football for the Nebraska Cornhuskers, earning third-team All-American honors in 1993. Jones was selected by the Raiders in the third round of the 1994 NFL draft. He played for the Los Angeles/Oakland Raiders and the Green Bay Packers. In his only season with the Packers, they won Super Bowl XXXI against the New England Patriots.

== College career ==
Jones rushed for 3,166 yards and scored 40 rushing touchdowns from 1990 to 1993 at the University of Nebraska–Lincoln. He played I-back under the direction of head coach Dr. Tom Osborne. Jones' single-season high was 1,210 rushing yards in 1992.

His best single-game performance came as a redshirt freshman on November 9, 1991, against Kansas when Jones ran the ball 27 times for 294 yards and six touchdowns, including a 69-yard scoring run. During the 1991 season, Jones led the nation with an incredible 8.3 yards per carry.

== Professional career ==
Pre-draft measurables
Height	Weight	Arm length	Hand span	40-yard dash	10-yard split	20-yard split	20-yard shuttle	Vertical jump
5 ft 11 1/8 in (1.81 m)	212 lb (96 kg)	32 3/4 in (0.83 m)	10 in (0.25 m)	4.58 s	1.61 s	2.61 s	4.09 s	30.5 in (0.77 m)

In the NFL, Jones played with the Raiders for two years. He ran for 112 yards on 27 carries in 2 seasons. He spent his final season with Green Bay.

Jones played with the Omaha Beef in 2000.

== Death ==
On January 22, 2025, Omaha Police Department officers responded to Jones' home to assist firefighters with a natural gas odor. Jones was found unresponsive in the basement, and was pronounced dead. He was using a generator in lieu of a malfunctioning furnace, and officials said the circumstances of his death were indicative of carbon monoxide poisoning. Jones was 54.

== Statistics ==
Jones' stats for the Nebraska Cornhuskers
	Rushing					Receiving				
YEAR	ATT	YDS	AVG	LNG	TD	NO.	YDS	AVG	LNG	TD
1990	Redshirt									
1991	108	900	8.3	69	14	3	25	8.3	17	0
1992	168	1,210	7.2	90	14	14	162	11.6	41	1
1993	185	1,056	5.6	64	12	7	117	16.7	55	1
Totals	461	3,166	6.9	90	40	24	304	12.7	55	2

Jones' rushing stats in the NFL
Year	Team	ATT	YDS	AVG	TD
1994	RAI	22	93	4.2	0
1995	OAK	5	19	3.8	0
1996	GNB	0	0	0.0	0
Totals	—	27	112	4.1	0
