= Jim Skow =

American football player (born 1963)

No. 70, 71, 91, 94, 98
- Position: Defensive end

Personal information
- Born: June 29, 1963 (age 63); Omaha, Nebraska, U.S.
- Listed height: 6 ft 3 in (1.91 m)
- Listed weight: 253 lb (115 kg)

Career information
- High school: Roncalli (Omaha)
- College: Nebraska
- NFL draft: 1986: 3rd round, 58th overall pick

Career history
- Cincinnati Bengals (1986–1989); Tampa Bay Buccaneers (1990); Seattle Seahawks (1991); Los Angeles Rams (1992); San Diego Chargers (1992)

Awards and highlights
- First-team All-American (1985); First-team All-Big Eight (1985)

Career NFL statistics
- Sacks: 24
- Fumble recoveries: 1
- Stats at Pro Football Reference

Jim Skow (born June 29, 1963) is an American former professional football player who was a defensive end for seven seasons in the National Football League (NFL). He played college football for the Nebraska Cornhuskers, earning first-team All-American honors in 1985. Skow was selected 58th overall by the Cincinnati Bengals in the third round of the 1986 NFL draft. He finished his career with 24 sacks and one fumble recovery. His best season was in 1988, recording 9.5 sacks and helping the Bengals reach Super Bowl XXIII, where he recorded several tackles and a fumble recovery. After retiring from the NFL, he attended law school and received his Juris Doctor from Stetson University in 1996. He currently is in private practice in Daytona Beach.
