= Nate Swift =

American football player (born 1985)

No. 83
- Position: Wide receiver

Personal information
- Born: August 24, 1985 (age 41); Hutchinson, Minnesota, U.S.
- Listed height: 6 ft 2 in (1.88 m)
- Listed weight: 202 lb (92 kg)

Career information
- High school: Hutchinson
- College: Nebraska
- NFL draft: 2009: undrafted

Career history
- Denver Broncos (2009)*; Jacksonville Jaguars (2009)*
- * Offseason or practice squad member only

Nate Swift (born August 24, 1985) is an American former professional football player was a wide receiver in the National Football League (NFL). Swift was born in Hutchinson, Minnesota, on August 24, 1985. He played college football for the Nebraska Cornhuskers, setting a school record for career receptions (166) and finished second in season receiving yardage (941 in 2008), career receiving yardage (2,476), and season receptions (63 in 2008). He was signed as an undrafted free agent by the Denver Broncos on April 27, 2009, after the 2009 NFL draft. Swift was released in September and signed with the Jacksonville Jaguars on November 17, 2009, to their practice squad.
