= I. M. Hipp =

American football player (born 1956)

I.M. Hipp
No. 20
- Position: Running back

Personal information
- Born: February 15, 1956 (age 70); Chapin, South Carolina, U.S.
- Listed height: 5 ft 11 in (1.80 m)
- Listed weight: 201 lb (91 kg)

Career information
- High school: Chapin
- College: Nebraska
- NFL draft: 1980: 4th round, 104th overall pick

Career history
- Atlanta Falcons (1980)*; Oakland Raiders (1980); Denver Broncos (1981)*; Philadelphia Eagles (1982)*
- * Offseason or practice squad member only

Awards and highlights
- Super Bowl champion (XV); Second-team All-American (1977); First-team All-Big Eight (1977); Second-team All-Big Eight (1978)
- Stats at Pro Football Reference

Isiah Moses Walter Hipp (born February 15, 1956) is an American former professional football player who was a running back for one season with the Oakland Raiders of the National Football League (NFL). He played college football for the Nebraska Cornhuskers.

== College career ==
Hipp joined the Cornhuskers as a walk-on from Chapin, South Carolina. He did not start until the third game of his sophomore season but still gained 1,353 rushing yards that year. He ran for over 200 rushing yards three times in his sophomore season and scored 10 touchdowns. He was named a second-team All-American by United Press International. Cited as a possible Heisman Trophy nominee for the 1978 season, he ended the season receiving honorable mention by the Associated Press for their All-America team. When he finished career at Nebraska, he was the team's all-time leader in rushing yards at 3,040.

== Professional career ==
Hipp was drafted in the fourth round in the 1980 NFL draft as the 104th overall pick. He was released by the Falcons, but was signed in October 1980 by the Oakland Raiders. He played one game in the NFL.
