= Rick Berns =

American football player (born 1956)

No. 36, 40
- Position: Running back

Personal information
- Born: February 3, 1956 (age 70); Kadena Air Base, Okinawa, Japan
- Listed height: 6 ft 2 in (1.88 m)
- Listed weight: 205 lb (93 kg)

Career information
- High school: Wichita Falls (TX)
- College: Nebraska
- NFL draft: 1979: 3rd round, 80th overall pick

Career history
- Tampa Bay Buccaneers (1979–1980); Los Angeles Raiders (1982–1983)

Awards and highlights
- Super Bowl champion (XVIII); First-team All-Big Eight (1978); Second-team All-Big Eight (1977)

Career NFL statistics
- Rushing yards: 255
- Average: 3.8
- Touchdowns: 0
- Stats at Pro Football Reference

Richard Rickey Berns (born February 5, 1956) is an American former professional football player who was a running back in the National Football League (NFL). He was selected by the Tampa Bay Buccaneers in the third round of the 1979 NFL draft and later played for the Los Angeles Raiders. In his final season in 1983, the Raiders won Super Bowl XVIII.

Born at Kadena Air Force Base in Japan, he played high school football in Texas at Wichita Falls and college football at Nebraska under head coach Tom Osborne.

After football, Berns returned to Texas and worked in construction management in San Antonio.
