= 2024 UTEP Miners football team =

American college football season

2024 UTEP Miners football
- Conference: Conference USA
- Record: 3–9 (3–5 C-USA)
- Head coach: Scotty Walden (1st season)
- Offensive coordinator: Jake Brown (1st season)
- Co-offensive coordinator: Ryan Stanchek (1st season)
- Offensive scheme: Spread
- Defensive coordinator: J. J. Clark (1st season)
- Co-defensive coordinator: Kelvin Sigler (1st season)
- Base defense: 3–3–5
- Home stadium: Sun Bowl

2024 Conference USA football standings
	Conf.			Overall
Team	W		L	W		L
Jacksonville State y$	7	–	1	9	–	5
Western Kentucky y	6	–	2	8	–	6
Sam Houston	6	–	2	10	–	3
Liberty	5	–	3	8	–	4
Louisiana Tech	4	–	4	5	–	8
UTEP	3	–	5	3	–	9
FIU	3	–	5	4	–	8
New Mexico State	2	–	6	3	–	9
Middle Tennessee	2	–	6	3	–	9
Kennesaw State*	2	–	6	2	–	10
Championship: Jacksonville State 52, Western Kentucky 12
$ – Conference champion; y – Championship game participant; * – Ineligible for postseason play due to FCS-to-FBS transition rules

The 2024 UTEP Miners football team represented the University of Texas at El Paso (UTEP) as a member of Conference USA (C-USA) during the 2024 NCAA Division I FBS football season. Led by first-year head coach Scotty Walden, the Miners compiled an overall record of 3–9 with a mark of 3–5 in conference play, tying for sixth place in C-USA. The team played home games at the Sun Bowl in El Paso, Texas.

== Schedule ==
Date	Time	Opponent	Site	TV	Result	Attendance
August 31	1:30 p.m.	at Nebraska*	Memorial Stadium; Lincoln, NE	FOX	L 7–40	86,072
September 7	7:00 p.m.	Southern Utah*	Sun Bowl; El Paso, TX	ESPN+	L 24–27 ^{OT}	41,609
September 14	4:00 p.m.	at Liberty	Williams Stadium; Lynchburg, VA	ESPN+	L 10–28	21,805
September 21	3:00 p.m.	at Colorado State*	Canvas Stadium; Fort Collins, CO	TruTV	L 17–27	29,151
October 3	7:00 p.m.	Sam Houston	Sun Bowl; El Paso, TX	CBSSN	L 21–41	14,454
October 10	6:00 p.m.	at Western Kentucky	Houchens Industries–L. T. Smith Stadium; Bowling Green, KY	ESPNU	L 17–44	12,723
October 16	7:00 p.m.	FIU	Sun Bowl; El Paso, TX	CBSSN	W 30–21	11,373
October 22	6:00 p.m.	at Louisiana Tech	Joe Aillet Stadium; Ruston, LA	CBSSN	L 10–14	15,168
November 2	1:30 p.m.	Middle Tennessee	Sun Bowl; El Paso, TX	CBSSN	L 13–20	14,775
November 9	2:00 p.m.	Kennesaw State^{†}	Sun Bowl; El Paso, TX	ESPN+	W 43–35 ^{OT}	14,728
November 23	11:00 a.m.	at No. 11 Tennessee*	Neyland Stadium; Knoxville, TN	SECN+, ESPN+	L 0–56	101,915
November 30	2:00 p.m.	at New Mexico State	Aggie Memorial Stadium; Las Cruces, NM (Battle of I-10)	ESPN+	W 42–35	15,358
*Non-conference game; ^{†}Homecoming; Rankings from AP Poll (and CFP Rankings, after November 1) - Released prior to game; All times are in Mountain time

== Preseason ==
=== C-USA media poll ===
The Conference USA preseason media poll was released on July 19. The Miners were predicted to finish ninth.

== Game summaries ==
=== at Nebraska ===
Game One – UTEP Miners (0-0) at Nebraska Cornhuskers (0-0) – Game summary

Quarter	1	2	3	4	Total
Miners	7	0	0	0	7
Cornhuskers	7	23	7	3	40

at Memorial Stadium • Lincoln, Nebraska

- Date: August 31
- Game time: 2:30 PM
- Game weather: Sunny, 86 degrees, Wind: SW @ 8 mph
- Game attendance: 86,072
- Referee: Chris Coyte
- TV announcers (FOX): Jason Benetti (play-by-play), Brock Huard (analyst) and Allison Williams (sideline reporter)

Game information

First quarter

- (9:00) NEB – Dante Dowdell 5-yard run, Tristan Alvano kick (Drive: 12 plays, 72 yards, 5:54, Nebraska 7-0)
- (2:24) UTEP - Kam Thomas 38-yard pass from Skyler Locklear, Buzz Flabiano kick (Drive: 3 plays, 63 yards, 0:42, 7-7)

Second quarter

- (10:29) NEB - Ty Robinson Safety (Drive: 2 plays, -3 yards, 0:19, Nebraska 9-7)
- (10:04) NEB - Isaiah Neyor 59-yard pass from Dylan Raiola, Tristan Alvano kick (Drive: 2 plays, 59 yards, 0:18, Nebraska 16-7)
- (5:34) NEB - Gabe Ervin Jr. 3-yard run, Tristan Alvano kick (Drive: 8 plays, 63 yards, 3:45, Nebraska 23-7)
- (0:02) NEB - Jahmal Banks 21-yard pass from Dylan Raiola, Tristan Alvano kick (Drive: 9 plays, 59 yards, 2:03, Nebraska 30-7)

Third quarter

- (5:34) NEB – Gabe Ervin Jr. 1-yard run, Tristan Alvano kick (Drive: 11 plays, 73 yards, 5:04, Nebraska 37-7)

Fourth quarter

- (9:22) NEB – Tristan Alvano 20-yard field goal (Drive: 17 plays, 87 yards, 9:26, Nebraska 40-7)

Statistics	UTEP	NEB
First downs	12	30
Total yards	205	507
Rushes/yards	24/56	47/223
Passing yards	149	284
Passing: Comp–Att–Int	16–26–2	25–36–0
Time of possession	21:28	38:32

Team	Category	Player	Statistics
UTEP	Passing	Skyler Locklear	11/17, 115 yards, TD, INT
UTEP	Rushing	Jevon Jackson	10 carries, 32 yards
UTEP	Receiving	Kam Thomas	7 receptions, 71 yards, TD
Nebraska	Passing	Dylan Raiola	19/28, 238 yards, 2 TD
Nebraska	Rushing	Emmett Johnson	8 carries, 71 yards
Nebraska	Receiving	Isaiah Neyor	6 receptions, 121 yards, TD

=== vs. Southern Utah (FCS) ===
Game Two – Southern Utah Thunderbirds (FCS) (0–1) vs UTEP Miners (0–1) – Game summary

Quarter	1	2	3	4	OT	Total
Thunderbirds (FCS)	6	0	8	10	3	27
Miners	14	3	0	7	0	24

at Sun Bowl • El Paso, TX

- Date: Saturday September 7, 2024
- Game time: 7:00 p.m.
- Game weather: Sunny, 82 degrees
- Game attendance: 41,609
- Referee: Rory Bernard
- TV announcers (ESPN+): Andy Morgan, Ed Stansbury

Game information

First quarter

- (10:33) UTEP - Jevon Jackson 5-yard pass from Skyler Locklear, Buzz Flabiano kick (Drive: 9 plays, 75 yards, 4:27, UTEP 7-0)
- (6:09) SUU - Zach Mitchell 40-yard pass from Bronson Barron, two-point run conversion failed (Drive: 8 plays, 75 yards, 4:24, UTEP 7-6)
- (1:35) UTEP - Skyler Locklear 5-yard run, Buzz Flabiano kick (Drive: 11 plays, 75 yards, 4:34, UTEP 14-6)

Second quarter

- (2:57) UTEP - Buzz Flabiano 43-yard field goal (Drive: 7 plays, 50 yards, 2:59, UTEP 17-6)

Third quarter

- (6:31) SUU - Targhee Lambson 20-yard run, Mark Bails run for two-point conversion (Drive: 6 plays, 50 yards, 2:53, UTEP 17-14)

Fourth quarter

- (13:15) SUU - Targhee Lambson 46-yard run, Daniel King kick (Drive: 4 plays, 60 yards, 1:37, SUU 21-17)
- (2:39) SUU - Daniel King 38-yard field goal (Drive: 11 plays, 59 yards, 5:37, SUU 24-17)
- (0:00) UTEP - Skyler Locklear 4-yard pass from Jaden Smith, Buzz Flabiano kick (Drive: 9 plays, 77 yards, 2:34, 24-24)

Overtime

- (6:09) SUU - Daniel King 33-yard field goal (Drive: 7 plays, 9 yards SUU 27-24)

Statistics	SUU	UTEP
First downs	21	17
Total yards	383	423
Rushing yards	268	124
Passing yards	115	299
Passing: Comp–Att–Int	11-18-0	23-30-0
Time of possession	31:24	28:36

Team	Category	Player	Statistics
Southern Utah	Passing	Jackson Berry	10/17, 75 yards
Southern Utah	Rushing	Targhee Lambson	20 carries, 183 yards, 2 TD
Southern Utah	Receiving	Zach Mitchell	3 receptions, 62 yards, 1 TD
UTEP	Passing	Skyler Locklear	22/29, 295 yards, 1 TD
UTEP	Rushing	Jevon Jackson	20 carries, 80 yards
UTEP	Receiving	Kam Thomas	5 receptions, 99 yards

=== at Liberty ===
Game Three – UTEP Miners (0–2) at Liberty Flames (2–0) – Game summary

Quarter	1	2	3	4	Total
Miners	3	0	7	0	10
Flames	7	7	7	7	28

at Williams Stadium • Lynchburg, Virginia

- Date: September 14, 2024
- Game time: 4:00 p.m.
- Game weather: Sunny • Temperature: 78 °F (26 °C) • Wind: NE 7 miles per hour (11 km/h)
- Game attendance: 21,805
- Referee: Garrett Dickerson
- TV announcers (ESPN+): Matt Warner (play-by-play), Joe Jauch (analyst) and Emily Austen (sideline)

Game information

First quarter

- (9:40) UTEP – Buzz Flabiano 25-yard field goal (Drive: 8 plays, 37 yards, 3:26; UTEP 3–0)
- (4:34) LIB – Billy Lucas 12-yard run, Colin Karhu kick (Drive: 10 plays, 84 yards, 5:00; Liberty 7–3)

Second quarter

- (14:35) LIB – Billy Lucas 1-yard run, Colin Karhu kick (Drive: 2 plays, 24 yards, 0:13; Liberty 14–3)

Third quarter

- (12:26) UTEP – Kenny Odom 60-yard pass from Skyler Locklear, Buzz Flabiano kick (Drive: 4 plays, 71 yards, 1:11; Liberty 14–10)
- (2:07) LIB – Billy Lucas 2-yard run, Colin Karhu kick (Drive: 7 plays, 81 yards, 3:11; Liberty 21–10)

Fourth quarter

- (6:51) LIB – Tyson Mobley 13-yard pass from Kaidon Salter, Colin Karhu kick (Drive: 7 plays, 87 yards, 3:47; Liberty 28–10)

Statistics	UTEP	LIB
First downs	18	19
Total yards	335	415
Rushing yards	91	187
Passing yards	244	228
Passing: Comp–Att–Int	26–43–2	15–19–0
Time of possession	29:14	30:46

Team	Category	Player	Statistics
UTEP	Passing	Skyler Locklear	26/43, 244 yards, TD, 2 INT
UTEP	Rushing	Jevon Jackson	15 carries, 67 yards
UTEP	Receiving	Kam Thomas	8 receptions, 68 yards
Liberty	Passing	Kaidon Salter	15/19, 228 yards, TD
Liberty	Rushing	Billy Lucas	21 carries, 104 yards, 3 TD
Liberty	Receiving	Treon Sibley	4 receptions, 77 yards

=== at Colorado State ===
Game Four – UTEP Miners (0–3) vs Colorado State Rams (1–2) – Game summary

Quarter	1	2	3	4	Total
Miners	0	3	7	7	17
Rams	7	7	10	3	27

at Canvas Stadium • Fort Collins, CO

- Date: September 21, 2024
- Game time: 3:00 p.m.
- Game weather: Sunny, 70 °F (21 °C)
- Game attendance: 29,151
- Referee: Douglas Mercer
- TV announcers (TruTV): J. B. Long (play-by-play) and Mike Golic Jr. (analyst)

Game information

First quarter

- CSU – Avery Morrow 2-yard run (Jordan Noyes kick), 8:52. Rams 7–0. Drive: 12 plays, 75 yards, 6:08.

Second quarter

- UTEP – Buzz Flabiano 45-yard field goal, 6:12. Rams 7–3. Drive: 4 plays, 1 yard, 1:28.
- CSU – Avery Morrow 73-yard run (Jordan Noyes kick), 5:24. Rams 14–3. Drive: 2 plays, 80 yards, 0:44.

Third quarter

- CSU – Armani Winfield 5-yard pass from Brayden Fowler-Nicolosi (Jordan Noyes kick), 11:54. Rams 21–3. Drive: 3 plays, 7 yards, 0:53.
- CSU – Jordan Noyes 37-yard field goal, 7:32. Rams 24–3. Drive: 8 plays, 42 yards, 3:40.
- UTEP – Kenny Odom 28-yard pass from Cade McConnell (Buzz Flabiano kick), 4:26. Rams 24–10. Drive: 7 plays, 75 yards, 3:06.

Fourth quarter

- UTEP – Kenny Odom 55-yard pass from Cade McConnell (Buzz Flabiano kick), 14:51. Rams 24–17. Drive: 9 plays, 92 yards, 2:49.
- CSU – Jordan Noyes 39-yard field goal, 1:32. Rams 27–17. Drive: 10 plays, 28 yards, 5:43.

Statistics	UTEP	CSU
First downs	15	14
Total yards	324	356
Rushing yards	48	224
Passing yards	276	132
Passing: Comp–Att–Int	26–44–1	14–22–1
Time of possession	26:42	33:18

Team	Category	Player	Statistics
UTEP	Passing	Cade McConnell	19/29, 220 yards, 2 TD
UTEP	Rushing	Jevon Jackson	10 carries, 35 yards
UTEP	Receiving	Kenny Odom	7 receptions, 128 yards, 2 TD
Colorado State	Passing	Brayden Fowler-Nicolosi	14/22, 132 yards, TD, INT
Colorado State	Rushing	Avery Morrow	21 carries, 156 yards, 2 TD
Colorado State	Receiving	Jordan Ross	1 reception, 36 yards

=== vs. Sam Houston ===
Game Five – Sam Houston Bearkats (4–1) vs. UTEP Miners (0–4) – Game summary

Quarter	1	2	3	4	Total
Bearkats	7	10	21	3	41
Miners	0	7	7	7	21

at Sun Bowl, El Paso, Texas

- Date: October 3, 2024
- Game time: 7:00 p.m.
- Game weather: Sunny • Temperature: 83 °F (28 °C) • Wind: NE 3 miles per hour (4.8 km/h)
- Game attendance: 14,454
- Referee: Douglas Mercer
- TV announcers (CBSSN): Alex Del Barrio (play-by-play) and Taylor McHargue (analyst)

Game information

First quarter

- (12:45) SAM – Jay Ducker 39-yard run, Christian Pavon kick (Drive: 5 plays, 75 yards, 2:15; Sam Houston 7–0)

Second quarter

- (4:24) SAM – DJ McKinney 23-yard run, Christian Pavon kick (Drive: 10 plays, 81 yards, 3:19; Sam Houston 14–0)
- (3:12) UTEP – Kory Chapman 0-yard fumble recovery, Buzz Flabiano kick (Sam Houston 14–7)
- (0:17) SAM – Christian Pavon 19-yard field goal (Drive: 13 plays, 73 yards, 2:55; Sam Houston 17–7)

Third quarter

- (13:23) SAM – Qua'Vez Humphreys 33-yard pass from Hunter Watson, Christian Pavon kick (Drive: 2 plays, 62 yards, 0:38; Sam Houston 24–7)
- (5:48) SAM – Michael Phoenix II 34-yard pass from Hunter Watson, Christian Pavon kick (Drive: 11 plays, 90 yards, 5:06; Sam Houston 31–7)
- (3:03) SAM – DJ McKinney 59-yard run, Christian Pavon kick (Drive: 3 plays, 68 yards, 0:53; Sam Houston 38–7)
- (0:23) UTEP – Marcus Vinson 52-yard pass from Cade McConnell, Buzz Flabiano kick (Drive: 6 plays, 75 yards, 2:40; Sam Houston 38–14)

Fourth quarter

- (9:25) UTEP – Ezell Jolly 4-yard run, Buzz Flabiano kick (Drive: 3 plays, 40 yards, 0:41; Sam Houston 38–21)
- (2:07) SAM – Christian Pavon 42-yard field goal (Drive: 13 plays, 50 yards, 7:12; Sam Houston 41–21)

Statistics	SHSU	UTEP
First downs	26	15
Total yards	517	323
Rushing yards	293	119
Passing yards	224	204
Turnovers	1	4
Time of possession	35:17	24:43

Team	Category	Player	Statistics
Sam Houston	Passing	Hunter Watson	19/29, 224 yards, 2 TD
Sam Houston	Rushing	DJ McKinney	14 carries, 138 yards, 2 TD
Sam Houston	Receiving	Qua'Vez Humphreys	2 receptions, 47 yards, TD
UTEP	Passing	Cade McConnell	15/28, 204 yards, TD, INT
UTEP	Rushing	Ezell Jolly	17 carries, 76 yards, TD
UTEP	Receiving	Kenny Odom	4 receptions, 70 yards

=== at Western Kentucky ===
Game Six – UTEP Miners (0–5) at Western Kentucky Hilltoppers (3–2) – Game summary

Quarter	1	2	3	4	Total
Miners	7	0	10	0	17
Hilltoppers	14	13	7	10	44

at Houchens Industries–L. T. Smith Stadium, Bowling Green, Kentucky

- Date: October 10, 2024
- Game time: 6:00 p.m.
- Game weather: Sunny
- Game attendance: 12,723
- Referee: Reed Brotherton
- TV announcers (ESPNU): Mike Corey (play-by-play) and Rene Ingoglia (analyst)

Game information

First quarter

- (7:40) WKU – Dalvin Smith 30-yard pass from Caden Veltkamp, Lucas Carneiro kick (Drive: 4 plays, 74 yards, 1:38; Western Kentucky 7–0)
- (7:02) UTEP – Kenny Odom 76-yard pass from Cade McConnell, Buzz Flabiano kick (Drive: 2 plays, 80 yards, 0:33; Tied 7–7)
- (2:18) WKU – Michael Mathison 12-yard run, Lucas Carneiro kick (Drive: 1 play, 12 yards, 0:05; Western Kentucky 14–7)

Second quarter

- (10:55) WKU – Lucas Carneiro 25-yard field goal (Drive: 9 plays, 51 yards, 4:34; Western Kentucky 17–7)
- (5:32) WKU – Caden Veltkamp 2-yard run, Lucas Carneiro kick (Drive: 10 plays, 43 yards, 3:43; Western Kentucky 24–7)
- (0:00) WKU – Lucas Carneiro 42-yard field goal (Drive: 12 plays, 23 yards, 2:53; Western Kentucky 27–7)

Third quarter

- (14:47) UTEP – Corey Wren 100-yard kickoff return, Buzz Flabiano kick (Western Kentucky 27–14)
- (5:29) UTEP – Buzz Flabiano 42-yard field goal (Drive: 11 plays, 57 yards, 5:36; Western Kentucky 27–17)
- (4:32) WKU – Michael Mathison 14-yard pass from Caden Veltkamp, Lucas Carneiro kick (Drive: 3 plays, 75 yards, 0:57; Western Kentucky 34–17)

Fourth quarter

- (12:27) WKU – Michael Mathison 3-yard pass from Caden Veltkamp, Lucas Carneiro kick (Drive: 6 plays, 52 yards, 2:33; Western Kentucky 41–17)
- (4:49) WKU – Lucas Carneiro 54-yard field goal (Drive: 7 plays, 30 yards, 3:32; Western Kentucky 44–17)

Statistics	UTEP	WKU
First downs	18	20
Total yards	330	482
Rushing yards	152	218
Passing yards	178	264
Passing: Comp–Att–Int	14–24–1	18–27–1
Time of possession	30:23	29:37

Team	Category	Player	Statistics
UTEP	Passing	Cade McConnell	3/7, 96 yards, TD, INT
UTEP	Rushing	Ezell Jolly	27 carries, 119 yards
UTEP	Receiving	Kenny Odom	1 reception, 76 yards, TD
Western Kentucky	Passing	Caden Veltkamp	18/27, 264 yards, 3 TD, INT
Western Kentucky	Rushing	Elijah Young	16 carries, 60 yards
Western Kentucky	Receiving	Easton Messer	6 receptions, 106 yards

=== vs. FIU ===
Game Seven – FIU Panthers (2–4) vs. UTEP Miners (0–6) – Game summary

Quarter	1	2	3	4	Total
Panthers	7	7	7	0	21
Miners	3	14	3	10	30

at Sun Bowl, El Paso, Texas

- Date: October 16, 2024
- Game time: 7:00 p.m.
- Game weather: Sunny, 72 degrees, Wind: NW @ 18 mph
- Game attendance: 11,373
- Referee: Ron Hudson
- TV announcers (CBSSN): Dave Ryan (play-by-play) and Brock Vereen (analyst)

Game information

First quarter

- (11:49) FIU - Dean Patterson 16-yard pass from Keyone Jenkins, Alejandro Prado kick (Drive: 3 plays, 30 yards, 1:18, FIU 7-0)
- (10:31) UTEP - Buzz Flabiano 27-yard field goal (Drive: 5 plays, 65 yards, 1:18, FIU 7-3)

Second quarter

- (14:29) UTEP - Skyler Locklear 3-yard run, Buzz Flabiano kick (Drive: 2 plays, 10 yards, 1:03, UTEP 10-7)
- (6:17) FIU - Eric Rivers 33-yard pass from Amari Jones, Alejandro Prado kick (Drive: 6 plays, 67 yards, 2:46, FIU 14-10)
- (0:25) UTEP - Jevon Jackson 22-yard pass from Skyler Locklear, Buzz Flabiano kick (Drive: 4 plays, 42 yards, 1:11, UTEP 17-14)

Third quarter

- (10:00) UTEP - Buzz Flabiano 44-yard field goal (Drive: 5 plays, 22 yards, 1:14, UTEP 20-14)
- (0:38) FIU - Kejon Owens 8-yard run, Alejandro Prado kick (Drive: 1 play, 8 yards, 0:05, FIU 21-20)

Fourth quarter

- (11:29) UTEP - Jevon Jackson 1-yard run, Buzz Flabiano kick (Drive: 10 plays, 76 yards, 4:03, UTEP 27-21)
- (2:30) UTEP - Buzz Flabiano 39-yard field goal (Drive: 6 plays, 16 yards, 2:26, UTEP 30-21)

Statistics	FIU	UTEP
First downs	14	20
Total yards	287	372
Rushing yards	85	211
Passing yards	202	161
Turnovers	4	2
Time of possession	29:56	30:04

Team	Category	Player	Statistics
FIU	Passing	Amari Jones	6/11, 92 yards, TD, INT
FIU	Rushing	Kejon Owens	9 carries, 36 yards, TD
FIU	Receiving	Eric Rivers	5 receptions, 91 yards, TD
UTEP	Passing	Skyler Locklear	14/23, 161 yards, TD, INT
UTEP	Rushing	Jevon Jackson	26 carries, 148 yards, TD
UTEP	Receiving	Kenny Odom	3 receptions, 75 yards

=== at Louisiana Tech ===
Game Eight – UTEP Miners (1–6) at Louisiana Tech Bulldogs (2–4) – Game summary

Quarter	1	2	3	4	Total
Miners	7	0	3	0	10
Bulldogs	0	7	0	7	14

at Joe Aillet Stadium, Ruston, Louisiana

- Date: October 22, 2024
- Game time: 6:00 p.m. MDT
- Game weather: Sunny, 74 °F (23 °C)
- Game attendance: 15,168
- Referee: Rory Bernard
- TV announcers (CBSSN): Alex Del Barrio (play-by-play) and Donte Whitner (analyst)

Game information

First quarter

- UTEP – Kam Thomas 47-yard pass from Skyler Locklear (Buzz Flabiano kick), 8:59. Miners 7–0. Drive: 8 plays, 94 yards, 3:02.

Second quarter

- LT – Solo Lewis 48-yard pass from Evan Bullock (Buck Buchanan kick), 5:49. Tied 7–7. Drive: 4 plays, 73 yards, 1:58.

Third quarter

- UTEP – Buzz Flabiano 44-yard field goal, 2:02. Miners 10–7. Drive: 8 plays, 53 yards, 3:43.

Fourth quarter

- LT – Amani Givens 1-yard run (Buck Buchanan kick), 6:28. Bulldogs 14–10. Drive: 11 plays, 97 yards, 5:27.

Statistics	UTEP	LT
First downs	14	12
Total yards	251	255
Rushing yards	166	7
Passing yards	85	248
Turnovers	0	0
Time of possession	28:48	31:12

Team	Category	Player	Statistics
UTEP	Passing	Skyler Locklear	7/11, 76 yards, TD
UTEP	Rushing	Jevon Jackson	22 carries, 112 yards
UTEP	Receiving	Kam Thomas	5 receptions, 67 yards, TD
Louisiana Tech	Passing	Evan Bullock	22/30, 248 yards, TD
Louisiana Tech	Rushing	Jimmy Holiday	6 carries, 18 yards
Louisiana Tech	Receiving	Jimmy Holiday	6 receptions, 93 yards

=== Middle Tennessee ===
Game Nine – Middle Tennessee Blue Raiders (2–6) at UTEP Miners (1–7) – Game summary

Quarter	1	2	3	4	Total
Blue Raiders	3	7	3	7	20
Miners	3	7	3	0	13

at Sun Bowl, El Paso, Texas

- Date: November 2, 2024
- Game time: 1:30 p.m. MDT
- Game weather: Sunny, 72 degrees
- Game attendance: 14,775
- Referee: Reed Brotherton
- TV announcers (CBSSN): Alex Del Barrio (play-by-play) and Adam Breneman (analyst)

Game information

First quarter

- (7:29) MTSU - Zeke Rankin 21-yard field goal (Drive: 7 plays, 34 yards, 3:43, MTSU 3-0)
- (2:23) UTEP - Buzz Flabiano 32-yard field goal (Drive: 7 plays, 40 yards, 2:08, 3-3)

Second quarter

- (7:31) UTEP - JP Pickles 17-yard run, Buzz Flabiano kick (Drive: 4 plays, 51 yards, 1:04, UTEP 10-3)
- (3:40) MTSU - Myles Butler 61-yard pass from Nicholas Vattiato, Zeke Rankin kick (Drive: 1 plays, 61 yards, 0:11, 10-10)

Third quarter

- (13:34) UTEP - Buzz Flabiano 29-yard field goal (Drive: 4 plays, 4 yards, 1:20, UTEP 13-10)
- (2:42) MTSU - Zeke Rankin 27-yard field goal (Drive: 10 plays, 57 yards, 4:38, 13-13)

Fourth quarter

- (1:53) MTSU - Nicholas Vattiato 1-yard run (Drive: 9 plays, 47 yards, 5:03, MTSU 20-13)

Statistics	MTSU	UTEP
First downs	17	20
Total yards	333	305
Rushing yards	94	160
Passing yards	239	145
Turnovers	3	1
Time of possession	31:26	28:34

Team	Category	Player	Statistics
Middle Tennessee	Passing	Nicholas Vattiato	21/35, 239 yards, TD, 2 INT
Middle Tennessee	Rushing	Jaiden Credle	10 carries, 40 yards
Middle Tennessee	Receiving	Myles Butler	5 receptions, 101 yards, TD
UTEP	Passing	JP Pickles	18/33, 145 yards, INT
UTEP	Rushing	Jevon Jackson	21 carries, 83 yards
UTEP	Receiving	Jevon Jackson	5 receptions, 33 yards

=== Kennesaw State ===
Game Ten – Kennesaw State Owls (1–7) at UTEP Miners (1–8) – Game summary

Quarter	1	2	3	4	OT	2OT	Total
Owls	7	0	14	7	7	0	35
Miners	7	7	7	7	7	8	43

at Sun Bowl, El Paso, Texas

- Date: November 9, 2024
- Game time: 2:00 p.m. MDT
- Game weather: Sunny, 62 °F (17 °C)
- Game attendance: 14,728
- Referee: Ron Hudson
- TV announcers (ESPN+): Andy Morgan (play-by-play) and Ed Stansbury (analyst)

Game information

First quarter

- (7:00) UTEP – Kenny Odom 32 yard pass from Skyler Locklear, Buzz Flabiano kick (Drive: 8 plays, 89 yards, 3:55; UTEP 7–0)
- (6:47) KENN – Qua Ashley 97 yard kickoff return, Austin Welch kick (TIE 7–7)

Second quarter

- (1:56) UTEP – Marcus Vinson 11 yard pass from Skyler Locklear, Buzz Flabiano kick (Drive: 3 plays, 14 yards, 0:49; UTEP 14–7)

Third quarter

- (14:12) KENN – Christian Moss 60 yard pass from Davis Bryson (Drive: 2 plays, 62 yards, 0:42; UTEP 14–13)
- (11:23) UTEP – Jevon Jackson 1 yard run, Buzz Flabiano kick (Drive: 8 plays, 75 yards, 2:49; UTEP 21–13)
- (0:25) KENN – Michael Benefield 5 yard run, Davis Bryson pass to Carson Kent for two-point conversion (Drive: 4 plays, 22 yards, 2:00; TIE 21–21)

Fourth quarter

- (11:10) UTEP – Shay Smith 3 yard run, Buzz Flabiano kick (Drive: 8 plays, 75 yards, 4:15; UTEP 28–21)
- (2:43) KENN – Davis Bryson 14 yard run, Austin Welch kick (Drive: 2 plays, 18 yards, 0:39; TIE 28–28)

First overtime

- KENN – Qua Ashley 25 yard pass from Davis Bryson, Austin Welch kick (Drive: 1 play, 25 yards; KENN 35–28)
- UTEP – Kenny Odom 2 yard pass from Skyler Locklear, Buzz Flabiano kick (Drive: 3 plays, 25 yards; TIE 35–35)

Second overtime

- UTEP – Kenny Odom 16 yard pass from Skyler, Skyler Locklear pass to Jevon Jackson for two-point conversion (Drive: 4 plays, 25 yards; UTEP 43–35)

Statistics	KENN	UTEP
First downs	14	22
Total yards	300	453
Rushing yards	117	120
Passing yards	183	333
Passing: Comp–Att–Int	14–25–2	29–34–0
Time of possession	27:18	32:42

Team	Category	Player	Statistics
Kennesaw State	Passing	Davis Bryson	14/25, 183 yards, 2 TD, 2 INT
Kennesaw State	Rushing	Davis Bryson	16 carries, 70 yards, 1 TD
Kennesaw State	Receiving	Christian Moss	1 reception, 60 yards, 1 TD
UTEP	Passing	Skyler Locklear	28/33, 327 yards, 4 TD
UTEP	Rushing	Jevon Jackson	26 carries, 68 yards, 1 TD
UTEP	Receiving	Trey Goodman	12 receptions, 150 yards

=== at No. 11 Tennessee ===
Game Eleven – UTEP Miners (2–8) at No. 11 Tennessee Volunteers (8–2) – Game summary

Quarter	1	2	3	4	Total
Miners	0	0	0	0	0
No. 11 Volunteers	0	28	21	7	56

at Neyland Stadium, Knoxville, Tennessee

- Date: November 23, 2024
- Game time: 11:00 a.m. MDT
- Game weather: Cloudy • Temperature: 47 °F (8 °C) • Wind: NW 3 miles per hour (4.8 km/h)
- Game attendance: 101,915
- Referee: Kyle Olson
- TV announcers (ESPN+): Lowell Galindo, Fozzy Whittaker, and Marilyn Payne

Game information

First quarter

No scoring plays

Second quarter

- (13:22) TEN – Dylan Sampson 14-yard run, Max Gilbert kick (Drive: 9 plays, 68 yards, 3:00; Tennessee 7–0)
- (7:33) TEN – Squirrel White 9-yard pass from Nico Iamaleava, Max Gilbert kick (Drive: 4 plays, 36 yards, 1:43; Tennessee 14–0)
- (2:19) TEN – Ethan Davis 1-yard pass from Nico Iamaleava, Max Gilbert kick (Drive: 2 plays, 19 yards, 0:21; Tennessee 21–0)
- (0:08) TEN – Bru McCoy 18-yard pass from Nico Iamaleava, Max Gilbert kick (Drive: 6 plays, 54 yards, 0:53; Tennessee 28–0)

Third quarter

- (13:32) TEN – Bru McCoy 7-yard pass from Nico Iamaleava, Max Gilbert kick (Drive: 4 plays, 67 yards, 1:23; Tennessee 35–0)
- (8:09) TEN – Peyton Lewis 3-yard run, Max Gilbert kick (Drive: 1 play, 3 yards, 0:04; Tennessee 42–0)
- (1:30) TEN – Peyton Lewis 6-yard run, Max Gilbert kick (Drive: 6 plays, 65 yards, 1:31; Tennessee 49–0)

Fourth quarter

- (8:24) TEN – Cameron Seldon 3-yard run, Max Gilbert kick (Drive: 11 plays, 44 yards, 5:17; Tennessee 56–0)

Statistics	UTEP	TENN
First downs	15	26
Total yards	230	460
Rushing yards	81	241
Passing yards	149	219
Turnovers	3	0
Time of possession	33:49	26:11

Team	Category	Player	Statistics
UTEP	Passing	JP Pickles	10/15, 72 yards
UTEP	Rushing	Skyler Locklear	8 carries, 37 yards
UTEP	Receiving	Kenny Odom	8 receptions, 70 yards
Tennessee	Passing	Nico Iamaleava	17/23, 209 yards, 4 TD
Tennessee	Rushing	Dylan Sampson	11 carries, 77 yards, TD
Tennessee	Receiving	Bru McCoy	4 receptions, 37 yards, 2 TD

=== at New Mexico State (Battle of I-10) ===
Game Twelve – UTEP Miners (2–9) at New Mexico State Aggies (3–8) – Game summary

Quarter	1	2	3	4	Total
Miners	7	7	14	14	42
Aggies	17	7	0	11	35

at Aggie Memorial Stadium, Las Cruces, New Mexico

- Date: November 30, 2024
- Game time: 2:00 p.m. MDT
- Game weather: Sunny, 64 °F (18 °C)
- Game attendance: 15,358
- Referee: Garrett Dickerson
- TV announcers (ESPN+): Adam Young (play-by-play) and Danny Knee (analyst)

Game information

First quarter

- UTEP – Bryton Thompson 33-yard fumble return (Buzz Flabiano kick), 11:45. Miners 7–0.
- NMSU – Abraham Montano 59-yard field goal, 8:09. Miners 7–3. Drive: 9 plays, 33 yards, 3:36.
- NMSU – Seth McGowan 21-yard pass from Parker Awad (Abraham Montano kick), 6:02. Aggies 10–7. Drive: 2 plays, 75 yards, 0:39.
- NMSU – Mike Washington 9-yard run (Abraham Montano kick), 0:57. Aggies 17–7. Drive: 7 plays, 62 yards, 2:34.

Second quarter

- NMSU – T. J. Pride 35-yard pass from Parker Awad (Abraham Montano kick), 12:36. Aggies 24–7. Drive: 4 plays, 46 yards, 1:34.
- UTEP – Jevon Jackson 2-yard run (Buzz Flabiano kick), 10:13. Aggies 24–14. Drive: 8 plays, 75 yards, 2:23.

Third quarter

- UTEP – Jevon Jackson 3-yard run (Buzz Flabiano kick), 10:41. Aggies 24–21. Drive: 4 plays, 72 yards, 0:55.
- UTEP – Kenny Odom 30-yard pass from Skyler Locklear (Buzz Flabiano kick), 5:45. Miners 28–24. Drive: 5 plays, 66 yards, 1:56.

Fourth quarter

- UTEP – Kam Thomas 93-yard punt return (Buzz Flabiano kick), 13:23. Miners 35–24.
- UTEP – Bryton Thompson 5-yard fumble return (Buzz Flabiano kick), 13:12. Miners 42–24.
- NMSU – P. J. Johnson III 30-yard pass from Parker Awad (Mike Washington run), 7:22. Miners 42–32. Drive: 3 plays, 59 yards, 0:52.
- UTEP – Abraham Montano 23-yard field goal, 0:24. Miners 42–35. Drive: 20 plays, 93 yards, 4:09.

Statistics	UTEP	NMSU
First downs	14	33
Total yards	298	543
Rushing yards	121	203
Passing yards	177	340
Turnovers	1	3
Time of possession	20:28	39:32

Team	Category	Player	Statistics
UTEP	Passing	Skyler Locklear	12/26, 177 yards, TD
UTEP	Rushing	Jevon Jackson	18 carries, 79 yards, 2 TD
UTEP	Receiving	Kam Thomas	4 receptions, 90 yards
New Mexico State	Passing	Parker Awad	22/51, 340 yards, 3 TD, INT
New Mexico State	Rushing	Mike Washington	26 carries, 130 yards, TD
New Mexico State	Receiving	P. J. Johnson III	3 receptions, 90 yards, TD

== Personnel ==
=== Coaching staff changes ===
==== Outgoing ====
Name	Position	Reason
Dana Dimel	Head coach	Fired
Scotty Ohara	Offensive coordinator, quarterbacks coach, and wide receivers coach	N/A
Bradley Dale Peveto	Defensive coordinator and linebackers coach	N/A
Aaron Price	Special teams coordinator	N/A
Mike Simmonds	Offensive line coach	N/A
Barrick Nealy	Assistant head coach and running backs coach	N/A
Drew Liddle	Tight ends coach and fullbacks coach	N/A
Matt Wallerstedt	Associate head coach and defensive line coach	N/A
Dante Barnett	Secondary coach and safeties coach	N/A

==== Incoming ====
Name	Position	Previous position
Scotty Walden	Head coach	Austin Peay head coach (2020–2023)
Jake Brown	Offensive coordinator and wide receivers coach	Louisiana Tech co-offensive coordinator and wide receivers coach (2022–2023)
J. J. Clark	Defensive coordinator and linebackers coach	Austin Peay defensive coordinator and safeties coach (2023)
Kevin Sigler	Co-defensive coordinator and safeties coach	Jacksonville State safeties coach (2022–2023)
Ryan Stanchek	Co-offensive coordinator and offensive line coach	Tulsa offensive line coach (2023)
Joe Pappalardo	Co-special teams coordinator	Austin Peay special teams coordinator (2022–2023)
Jajuan Dulaney	Tight ends coach	Austin Peay tight ends coach (2023)
Jourdan McNeill	Running backs coach	Austin Peay running backs coach (2021–2023)
Seth McDonald	Co-special teams coordinator	Austin Peay co-special teams coordinator and linebackers coach (2023)
Chris Jones	Defensive line coach	Austin Peay co-defensive coordinator and defensive line coach (2021–2023)
Aaron Foster	Cornerbacks coach	Austin Peay cornerbacks coach (2023)

=== Transfers ===
==== Incoming ====
Name	Pos.	Previous school	Year
Jevon Jackson	RB	Austin Peay	Redshirt Sophomore
Dylan Brown-Turner	LB	Florida State	Freshman
Dorian Hopkins	LB	Tulsa	Redshirt Senior
Tray Dunson	LB	Gardner–Webb	Senior
Dillon Williams	S	North Texas	Sophomore
Yessman Green	CB	Jacksonville State	Junior
Skyler Locklear	QB	Austin Peay	Redshirt Freshman
Trey Goodman	WR	Austin Peay	Junior
Jaden Smith	WR	Eastern Kentucky	Junior
Marquez Taylor	RB	Austin Peay	Freshman
Kory Chapman	S	Austin Peay	Senior
Kenny Odom	WR	Austin Peay	Redshirt Freshman
Ashton Nickelberry	WR	Austin Peay	Redshirt Junior
Kam Thomas	WR	Austin Peay	Junior
Brennan Smith	IOL	Austin Peay	Redshirt Sophomore
Isaiah Wright	OT	Austin Peay	Senior
Devin Goree	EDGE	Missouri State	Junior
Quinzavious Warren	DL	Jacksonville State	Junior
Chris Carter	OT	Georgia Southern	Junior
Kofi Taylor-Barrocks	LB	Colorado	Freshman

==== Outgoing ====
Name	Pos.	New school	Year
Latrez Shelton	CB	Texas State	Junior
Cartraven Walker	RB	TBD	Redshirt Junior
Kelly Akharaiyi	WR	Mississippi State	Redshirt Junior
Steven Hubbard	OT	Vanderbilt	Redshirt Senior
Joshua Sloan	P	Memphis	Junior
Kobe Hylton	CB	Oklahoma State	Redshirt Junior
James Neal	LB	Texas State	Junior
Torey Richardson	CB	Temple	Redshirt Senior
Justin Mayers	IOL	Colorado	Redshirt Junior
Marcus Vinson	TE	TBD	Sophomore
Torrance Burgess Jr.	RB	Texas State	Junior
Jeremiah Ballard	WR	Tulsa	Redshirt Sophomore
Tyrin Smith	WR	TBD	Senior
Deion Hankins	RB	Texas State	Redshirt Junior
Jerome Edwards Jr.	LB	TBD	Redshirt Sophomore
Trez Moore	CB	Texas State	Senior
Aluma Nkele	IOL	Minnesota	Redshirt Sophomore
Mike Franklin	RB	Jacksonville State	Junior
Jake McNamara	QB	New Mexico State	Redshirt Freshman
Elijah Boyd	TE	Bowling Green	Sophomore
