= 2024 Nebraska Cornhuskers football team =

American college football season

2024 Nebraska Cornhuskers football

Pinstripe Bowl champion

Pinstripe Bowl, W 20–15 vs. Boston College
- Conference: Big Ten Conference
- Record: 7–6 (3–6 Big Ten)
- Head coach: Matt Rhule (2nd season)
- Offensive coordinator: Marcus Satterfield (2nd season; first nine games); Dana Holgorsen (interim; remainder of season)
- Co-offensive coordinator: Glenn Thomas (1st season)
- Offensive scheme: Pro-style
- Defensive coordinator: Tony White (2nd season)
- Base defense: 3–3–5
- Home stadium: Memorial Stadium

Uniform
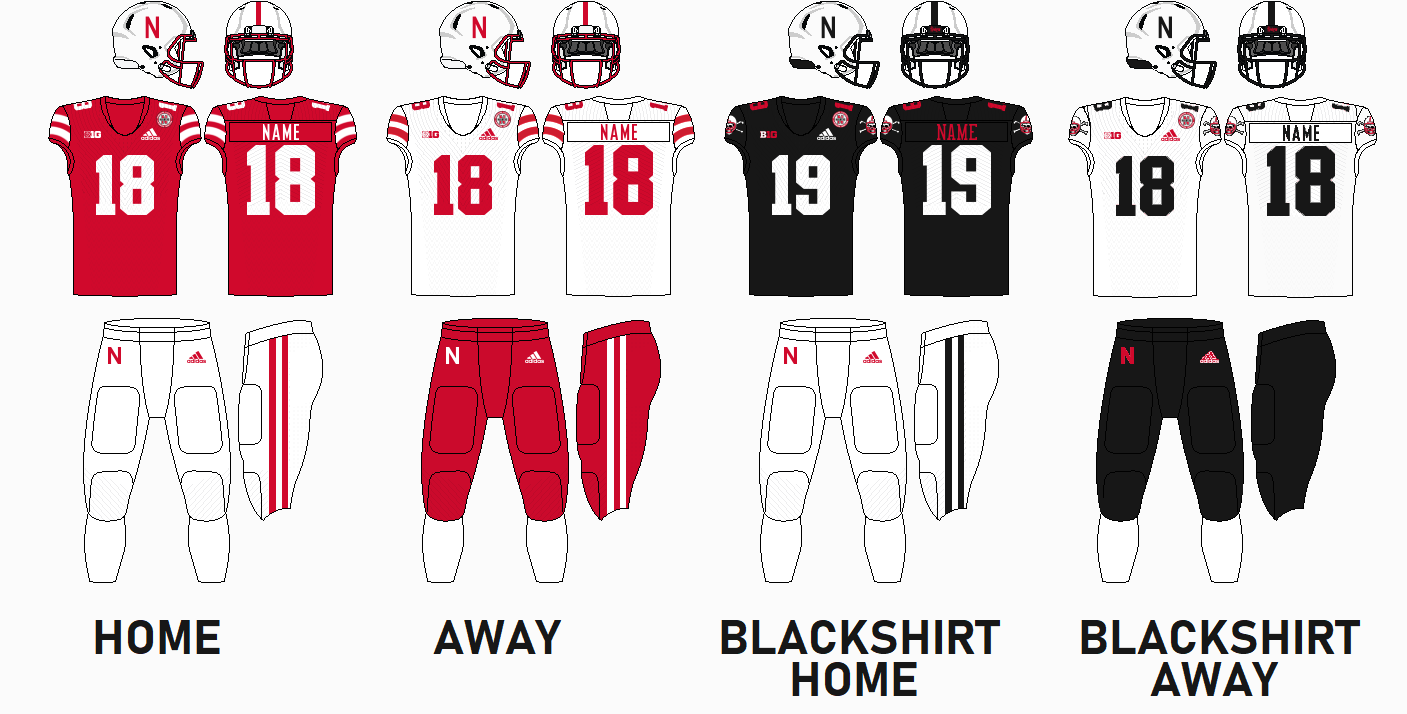

2024 Big Ten Conference football standings
	Conf.			Overall
Team	W		L	W		L
No. 3 Oregon y$^	9	–	0	13	–	1
No. 10 Indiana ^	8	–	1	11	–	2
No. 5 Penn State y^	8	–	1	13	–	3
No. 1 Ohio State #^	7	–	2	14	–	2
No. 16 Illinois	6	–	3	10	–	3
Iowa	6	–	3	8	–	5
Michigan	5	–	4	8	–	5
Minnesota	5	–	4	8	–	5
USC	4	–	5	7	–	6
Rutgers	4	–	5	7	–	6
Washington	4	–	5	6	–	7
Nebraska	3	–	6	7	–	6
UCLA	3	–	6	5	–	7
Wisconsin	3	–	6	5	–	7
Northwestern	2	–	7	4	–	8
Maryland	1	–	8	4	–	8
Michigan State†	0	–	6	0	–	7
Purdue	0	–	9	1	–	11
Championship: Oregon 45, Penn State 37
# – College Football Playoff champion; ^ – College Football Playoff participant; $ – Conference champion; y – Championship game participant; † — NCAA vacated all wins for Michigan State (5–7, 3–6); Rankings from AP Poll

The 2024 Nebraska Cornhuskers football team represented the University of Nebraska–Lincoln as a member of the Big Ten Conference during the 2024 NCAA Division I FBS football season. The Cornhuskers were led by second-year head coach Matt Rhule, and they played their home contests at Memorial Stadium in Lincoln, Nebraska.

Going into their game against Northern Iowa, the Cornhuskers were ranked in the AP Poll for the first time since 2019. Following a victory in said contest, the team achieved their first 3–0 start since 2016. Then, after knocking off rival Wisconsin for the first time since 2012, the team became bowl eligible. This marked the end of a postseason drought that dated back to that same 2016 season, the longest among college football power conference schools.

== Offseason ==
=== Transfers ===
==== Incoming ====
Name	Position	Height	Weight	Class	Hometown	Previous
Blye Hill	CB	6'3"	185	Freshman	Baltimore, MD	St. Francis (PA)
Jahmal Banks	WR	6'4"	205	Junior	Washington, DC	Wake Forest
Isaiah Neyor	WR	6'3"	215	Senior	Fort Worth, TX	Texas
Dante Dowdell	RB	6'2"	215	Freshman	Picayune, MS	Oregon
Stefon Thompson	LB	6'1"	248	Sophomore	Charlotte, NC	Syracuse
Micah Mazzccua	IOL	6'5"	325	Senior	Philadelphia, PA	Florida
Jalyn Gramstad	QB	6'0"	190	Senior	Lester, IA	Northwestern (IA)
Vincent Genatone	LB	6'1"	218	RS Sophomore	North Platte, NE	Montana
Ceyair Wright	DB	6'1"	180	RS Freshman	Los Angeles, CA	USC
Mac Markway	TE	6'4"	260	Sophomore	St. Louis, MO	LSU

==== Outgoing ====
Name	Number	Position	Height	Weight	Class	Hometown	Destination
Jake Appleget	#83	TE	6'4"	220	(R) Freshman	Lincoln, NE	Northern Illinois
Chief Borders	#14	DE	6'4"	245	(R) Junior	Chicago, IL	Pittsburgh
Eric Fields	#29	LB	6'1"	195	(R) Freshman	Ardmore, OK	TBD
John Goodwin	#46	TE	6'3"	235	(R) Junior	Lincoln, NE	Concordia (NE)
Isaiah Harris	#37	RB	5'8"	185	(R) Sophomore	Omaha, NE	Nebraska-Kearney
Randolph Kpai	#30	LB	6'2"	210	Sophomore	Sioux Falls, SD	New Mexico
Tamon Lynum	#15	CB	6'2"	180	(R) Sophomore	Orlando, FL	Pittsburgh
Barron Miles	#32	WR	5'10"	180	(R) Sophomore	Montreal, Quebec, Canada	Grambling State
Javier Morton	#25	CB	6'2"	195	Junior	Atlanta, GA	Temple
Chubba Purdy	#12	QB	6'2"	210	(R) Sophomore	Queen Creek, AZ	Nevada (Note: Originally committed to San Jose State.)
Jeff Sims	#7	QB	6'4"	220	Junior	Jacksonville, FL	Arizona State

==== Scholarship recruits ====
College recruiting
Name	Hometown	School	Height	Weight	Commit date
Dylan Raiola; QB	Gilbert, AZ	Buford	6 ft 3 in (1.91 m)	230 lb (100 kg)	Dec 18, 2023
Dylan Raiola; QB	Recruit ratings: Rivals: 247Sports: ESPN: (91)				
Carter Nelson; TE	Ainsworth, NE	Ainsworth	6 ft 4 in (1.93 m)	215 lb (98 kg)	Jun 28, 2023
Carter Nelson; TE	Recruit ratings: Rivals: 247Sports: ESPN: (83)				
Grant Brix; IOL	Logan, IA	Logan-Magnolia	6 ft 5.5 in (1.97 m)	280 lb (130 kg)	Nov 28, 2023
Grant Brix; IOL	Recruit ratings: Rivals: 247Sports: ESPN: (84)				
Preston Taumua; IOL	Waipahu, HI	Waipahu High School	6 ft 3.5 in (1.92 m)	300 lb (140 kg)	Jul 17, 2023
Preston Taumua; IOL	Recruit ratings: Rivals: 247Sports: ESPN: (82)				
Roger Gradney; S	Altair, TX	Rice	6 ft 0 in (1.83 m)	200 lb (91 kg)	Feb 20, 2023
Roger Gradney; S	Recruit ratings: Rivals: 247Sports: ESPN: (80)				
Mario Buford; CB	DeSoto, TX	DeSoto	5 ft 11 in (1.80 m)	155 lb (70 kg)	Jun 8, 2023
Mario Buford; CB	Recruit ratings: Rivals: 247Sports: ESPN: (80)				
Dae'vonn Hall; WR	Bellevue, NE	Bellevue West	6 ft 1.5 in (1.87 m)	180 lb (82 kg)	Jun 23, 2023
Dae'vonn Hall; WR	Recruit ratings: Rivals: 247Sports: ESPN: (80)				
Jacory Barney Jr. WR	Miami, FL	Miami Palmetto	6 ft 0 in (1.83 m)	160 lb (73 kg)	Jul 1, 2023
Jacory Barney Jr. WR	Recruit ratings: Rivals: 247Sports: ESPN: (78)				
Isaiah McMorris; WR	Omaha, NE	Bellevue West	5 ft 9.5 in (1.77 m)	170 lb (77 kg)	Jun 23, 2023
Isaiah McMorris; WR	Recruit ratings: Rivals: 247Sports: ESPN: (79)				
Evan Taylor; CB	Waxhaw, NC	Cuthberston	6 ft 3 in (1.91 m)	180 lb (82 kg)	Jun 19, 2023
Evan Taylor; CB	Recruit ratings: Rivals: 247Sports: ESPN: (79)				
Caleb Benning; S	Omaha, NE	Westside	5 ft 10.5 in (1.79 m)	180 lb (82 kg)	Oct 20, 2023
Caleb Benning; S	Recruit ratings: Rivals: 247Sports: ESPN: (78)				
Vincent Shavers; LB	Miami Gardens, FL	Miami Central	6 ft 0 in (1.83 m)	205 lb (93 kg)	Dec 20, 2023
Vincent Shavers; LB	Recruit ratings: Rivals: 247Sports: ESPN: (78)				
Willis McGahee IV; LB	Miami, FL	Christopher Columbus	6 ft 2 in (1.88 m)	215 lb (98 kg)	Apr 22, 2023
Willis McGahee IV; LB	Recruit ratings: Rivals: 247Sports: ESPN: (79)				
Keelan Smith; TE	Liberty, MO	Liberty North	6 ft 3 in (1.91 m)	200 lb (91 kg)	May 5, 2023
Keelan Smith; TE	Recruit ratings: Rivals: 247Sports: ESPN: (77)				
Gibson Pyle; IOL	Houston, TX	Klein Cain	6 ft 4.5 in (1.94 m)	275 lb (125 kg)	Apr 1, 2023
Gibson Pyle; IOL	Recruit ratings: Rivals: 247Sports: ESPN: (79)				
Daniel Kaelin; QB	Bellevue, NE	Bellevue West	6 ft 3 in (1.91 m)	200 lb (91 kg)	May 20, 2023
Daniel Kaelin; QB	Recruit ratings: Rivals: 247Sports: ESPN: (78)				
Ian Flynt; TE	Katy, TX	Taylor	6 ft 5 in (1.96 m)	248 lb (112 kg)	Apr 24, 2023
Ian Flynt; TE	Recruit ratings: Rivals: 247Sports: ESPN: (77)				
Ashton Murphy; DL	Elkhorn, NE	Elkhorn South	6 ft 5 in (1.96 m)	242 lb (110 kg)	Apr 11, 2023
Ashton Murphy; DL	Recruit ratings: Rivals: 247Sports: ESPN: (77)				
Amare Sanders; CB	Miami, FL	Gulliver Prep	6 ft 2 in (1.88 m)	167 lb (76 kg)	Dec 20, 2023
Amare Sanders; CB	Recruit ratings: Rivals: 247Sports: ESPN: (76)				
Larry Tarver; CB	Miami, FL	TRU Prep	5 ft 11 in (1.80 m)	160 lb (73 kg)	Dec 20, 2023
Larry Tarver; CB	Recruit ratings: Rivals: 247Sports: ESPN: (77)				
Quinn Clark; WR	Bozeman, MT	Gallatin	6 ft 4.5 in (1.94 m)	190 lb (86 kg)	Jun 27, 2023
Quinn Clark; WR	Recruit ratings: Rivals: 247Sports: ESPN: (78)				
Braylen Prude; S	Pearland, TX	Shadow Creek	6 ft 5 in (1.96 m)	190 lb (86 kg)	Jun 18, 2023
Braylen Prude; S	Recruit ratings: Rivals: 247Sports: ESPN: (74)				
Eric Ingwerson; TE	Papillion, NE	Papillion-La Vista	6 ft 7 in (2.01 m)	245 lb (111 kg)	Sep 27, 2023
Eric Ingwerson; TE	Recruit ratings: Rivals: 247Sports: ESPN: (74)				
Rex Guthrie; S	Littleton, CO	Heritage	6 ft 1 in (1.85 m)	205 lb (93 kg)	Jun 20, 2023
Rex Guthrie; S	Recruit ratings: Rivals: 247Sports: ESPN: (76)				
Donovan Jones; S	Omaha, NE	Omaha North	6 ft 0.5 in (1.84 m)	180 lb (82 kg)	Jun 22, 2023
Donovan Jones; S	Recruit ratings: Rivals: 247Sports: ESPN: (75)				
Landen Davidson; IOL	Broomfield, CO	Broomfield	6 ft 4 in (1.93 m)	295 lb (134 kg)	Jun 20, 2023
Landen Davidson; IOL	Recruit ratings: Rivals: 247Sports: ESPN: (77)				
Alexander Ruggeroli; OT	Las Vegas, NV	Bishop Gorman	6 ft 8 in (2.03 m)	265 lb (120 kg)	Dec 23, 2023
Alexander Ruggeroli; OT	Recruit ratings: Rivals: 247Sports: ESPN: (80)				
Jake Peters; IOL	Cedar Falls, IA	Cedar Falls	6 ft 3 in (1.91 m)	265 lb (120 kg)	Jun 18, 2023
Jake Peters; IOL	Recruit ratings: Rivals: 247Sports: ESPN: (76)				
Kamdyn Koch; P	Westminster, MD	Winters Mill	6 ft 3 in (1.91 m)	190 lb (86 kg)	Dec 23, 2023
Kamdyn Koch; P	Recruit ratings: Rivals: 247Sports: ESPN: (73)				
Overall recruit ranking:
Note: In many cases, Scout, Rivals, 247Sports, On3, and ESPN may conflict in their listings of height and weight.; In these cases, the average was taken. ESPN grades are on a 100-point scale.; Sources: "2024 Team Ranking". Rivals.com.

== Schedule ==
Date	Time	Opponent	Rank	Site	TV	Result	Attendance
August 31	2:30 p.m.	UTEP*		Memorial Stadium; Lincoln, NE	FOX	W 40–7	86,072
September 7	6:30 p.m.	Colorado*		Memorial Stadium; Lincoln, NE (rivalry)	NBC	W 28–10	86,906
September 14	6:30 p.m.	No. 21 (FCS) Northern Iowa*	No. 23	Memorial Stadium; Lincoln, NE	BTN	W 34–3	86,546
September 20	7:00 p.m.	No. 24 Illinois	No. 22	Memorial Stadium; Lincoln, NE	FOX	L 24–31 ^{OT}	86,936
September 28	11:00 a.m.	at Purdue		Ross–Ade Stadium; West Lafayette, IN	Peacock	W 28–10	61,441
October 5	3:00 p.m.	Rutgers^{†}		Memorial Stadium; Lincoln, NE	FS1	W 14–7	87,464
October 19	11:00 a.m.	at No. 16 Indiana		Memorial Stadium; Bloomington, IN (Big Noon Kickoff)	FOX	L 7–56	53,082
October 26	11:00 a.m.	at No. 4 Ohio State		Ohio Stadium; Columbus, OH (Big Noon Kickoff)	FOX	L 17–21	104,830
November 2	2:30 p.m.	UCLA		Memorial Stadium; Lincoln, NE	BTN	L 20–27	87,453
November 16	3:00 p.m.	at USC		Los Angeles Memorial Coliseum; Los Angeles, CA	FOX	L 20–28	75,304
November 23	2:30 p.m.	Wisconsin		Memorial Stadium; Lincoln, NE (Freedom Trophy)	BTN	W 44–25	86,923
November 29	6:30 p.m.	at Iowa		Kinnick Stadium; Iowa City, IA (Heroes Game)	NBC	L 10–13	69,250
December 28	11:00 a.m.	vs. Boston College*		Yankee Stadium; Bronx, NY (Pinstripe Bowl)	ABC	W 20–15	30,062
*Non-conference game; ^{†}Homecoming; Rankings from AP Poll – Released prior to game; All times are in Central time; Source:

== Rankings ==
Ranking movements Legend: ██ Increase in ranking ██ Decrease in ranking — = Not ranked RV = Received votes
	Week																
Poll	Pre	1	2	3	4	5	6	7	8	9	10	11	12	13	14	15	Final
AP	RV	RV	23	22	RV	RV	RV	RV	RV	—	—	—	—	—	—	—	—
Coaches	RV	RV	24	22	RV	RV	RV	25	RV	—	—	—	—	—	—	—	—
CFP	Not released										—	—	—	—	—	—	Not released

== Game summaries ==
=== vs. UTEP ===
Game One – UTEP Miners (0–0) at Nebraska Cornhuskers (0–0) – Game summary

Quarter	1	2	3	4	Total
Miners	7	0	0	0	7
Cornhuskers	7	23	7	3	40

at Memorial Stadium • Lincoln, Nebraska

- Date: August 31
- Game time: 2:30 PM
- Game weather: Sunny, 86 °F (30 °C), Wind: SW @ 8 miles per hour (13 km/h)
- Game attendance: 86,072
- Referee: Chris Coyte
- TV announcers (FOX): Jason Benetti (play-by-play), Brock Huard (analyst), and Allison Williams (sideline reporter)
- Sources: huskers.com

Game information

First Quarter

- (9:00) NEB – Dante Dowdell 5-yard run, Tristan Alvano kick (Drive: 12 plays, 72 yards, 5:54, Nebraska 7–0)
- (2:24) UTEP – Kam Thomas 38-yard pass from Skyler Locklear, Buzz Flabiano kick (Drive: 3 plays, 63 yards, 0:42, 7–7)

Second Quarter

- (10:29) NEB – Ty Robinson Safety (Drive: 2 plays, −3 yards, 0:19, Nebraska 9–7)
- (10:04) NEB – Isaiah Neyor 59-yard pass from Dylan Raiola, Tristan Alvano kick (Drive: 2 plays, 59 yards, 0:18, Nebraska 16–7)
- (5:34) NEB – Gabe Ervin Jr. 3-yard run, Tristan Alvano kick (Drive: 8 plays, 63 yards, 3:45, Nebraska 23–7)
- (0:02) NEB – Jahmal Banks 21-yard pass from Dylan Raiola, Tristan Alvano kick (Drive: 9 plays, 59 yards, 2:03, Nebraska 30–7)

Third Quarter

- (5:34) NEB – Gabe Ervin Jr. 1-yard run, Tristan Alvano kick (Drive: 11 plays, 73 yards, 5:04, Nebraska 37–7)

Fourth Quarter

- (9:22) NEB – Tristan Alvano 20-yard field goal (Drive: 17 plays, 87 yards, 9:26, Nebraska 40–7)

Statistics	UTEP	NEB
First downs	12	30
Total yards	205	507
Rushes/yards	24 car/56 yds	47 car/223 yds
Passing yards	149	284
Passing: Comp–Att–Int	16–26–2	25–36–0
Time of possession	21:28	38:32

Team	Category	Player	Statistics
UTEP	Passing	Skyler Locklear	11–17, 115 yds, 1 TD, 1 INT
UTEP	Rushing	Jevon Jackson	10 car, 32 yds
UTEP	Receiving	Kam Thomas	7 rec, 71 yds, 1 TD
Nebraska	Passing	Dylan Raiola	19–28, 238 yds, 2 TD
Nebraska	Rushing	Emmett Johnson	8 car, 71 yds
Nebraska	Receiving	Isaiah Neyor	6 rec, 121 yds, 1 TD

=== vs. Colorado (rivalry) ===
Game Two – Colorado Buffaloes (1–0) at Nebraska Cornhuskers (1–0) – Game summary

Quarter	1	2	3	4	Total
Buffaloes	0	0	3	7	10
Cornhuskers	14	14	0	0	28

at Memorial Stadium • Lincoln, NE

- Date: September 7, 2024
- Game time: 6:30 p.m.
- Game weather: Sunny, 72 °F (22 °C), Wind: SE @ 6 miles per hour (10 km/h)
- Game attendance: 86,906
- Referee: Mike McCabe
- TV announcers (NBC): Paul Burmeister (play-by-play), Colt McCoy (analyst), and Kathryn Tappen (sideline reporter)
- Boxscore

Game information

First Quarter

- (10:34) NEB – Dante Dowdell 12-yard run, Tristan Alvano kick (Drive: 7 plays, 49 yards, 3:22, Nebraska 7–0)
- (5:46) NEB – Tommi Hill 7-yard interception return, Tristan Alvano kick (Drive: 0:05, Nebraska 14–0)

Second Quarter

- (6:44) NEB – Dante Dowdell 1-yard run, Tristan Alvano kick (Drive: 9 plays, 86 yards, 4:46, Nebraska 21–0)
- (0:40) NEB – Rahmir Johnson 18-yard pass from Dylan Raiola, Tristan Alvano kick (Drive: 3 plays, 70 yards, 0:45, Nebraska 28–0)

Third Quarter

- (10:38) CU – Alejandro Mata 27-yard field goal (Drive: 8 plays, 49 yards, 2:46, Nebraska 28–3)

Fourth Quarter

- (8:45) CU – LaJohntay Wester 5-yard pass from Shedeur Sanders, Alejandro Mata kick (Drive: 6 plays, 58 yards, 2:04, Nebraska 28–10)

Statistics	COLO	NEB
First downs	15	22
Total yards	260	334
Rushes/yards	22 / 16	35 / 149
Passing yards	244	185
Passing: Comp–Att–Int	23–40–1	23–30–0
Time of possession	24:39	35:21

Team	Category	Player	Statistics
Colorado	Passing	Shedeur Sanders	23–38, 244 yds, 1 TD, 1 INT
Colorado	Rushing	Dallan Hayden	5 car, 32 yds
Colorado	Receiving	Travis Hunter	10 rec, 110 yds
Nebraska	Passing	Dylan Raiola	23–30, 185 yds, 1 TD
Nebraska	Rushing	Dante Dowdell	17 car, 77 yds, 2 TD
Nebraska	Receiving	Rahmir Johnson	8 rec, 49 yds, 1 TD

=== vs Northern Iowa (FCS) ===
Northern Iowa Panthers (FCS) (2–0) vs No. 23 Nebraska Cornhuskers (2–0) – Game summary

Quarter	1	2	3	4	Total
Panthers	3	0	0	0	3
No. 23 Cornhuskers	7	14	6	7	34

at Memorial Stadium • Lincoln, Nebraska

- Date: September 14
- Game time: 6:30 p.m.
- Game weather: Sunny, 82 °F (28 °C), Wind: SE @ 5 miles per hour (8 km/h)
- Game attendance: 86,546
- Referee: Jeffrey Servinski
- TV announcers (BTN): Guy Haberman (play-by-play), Yogi Roth (analyst), and Rhett Lewis (sideline reporter)
- Boxscore

Game information

First Quarter

- (11:40) NEB – Carter Nelson 24-yard pass from Dylan Raiola, Tristan Alvano kick (Drive: 8 plays, 75 yards, 3:20, Nebraska 7–0)
- (1:32) UNI – Caden Palmer 31-yard field goal (Drive: 16 plays, 62 yards, 10:08, Nebraska 7–3)

Second Quarter

- (13:04) NEB – Isaiah Neyor 18-yard pass from Dylan Raiola, Tristan Alvano kick (Drive: 7 plays,75 yards, 3:28, Nebraska 14–3)
- (6:51) NEB – Jacory Barney Jr. 10-yard run, Tristan Alvano kick (Drive: 4 plays, 80 yards, 2:05, Nebraska 21–3)

Third Quarter

- (6:17) NEB – Tristan Alvano 31-yard field goal (Drive: 9 plays, 68 yards, 3:31, Nebraska 24–3)
- (0:43) NEB – Tristan Alvano 21-yard field goal (Drive: 6 plays, 33 yards, 3:11, Nebraska 27–3)

Fourth Quarter

- (4:31) NEB – Emmett Johnson 36-yard run, John Hohl kick (Drive: 8 plays, 80 yards, 4:33, Nebraska 34–3)

Statistics	UNI	NEB
First downs	18	22
Total yards	71 / 301 yds	48 / 423 yds
Rushes/yards	39 att, 139 yds	22 att, 142 yds
Passing yards	162 yds	281 yds
Passing: Comp–Att–Int	16–32–1	20–26–1
Time of possession	38:07	21:53

Team	Category	Player	Statistics
Northern Iowa	Passing	Aidan Dunne	13/25, 117 yds, 1 INT
Northern Iowa	Rushing	Aidan Dunne	11 car, 49 yds
Northern Iowa	Receiving	Sergio Morancy	2 rec, 30 yds
Nebraska	Passing	Dylan Raiola	17/23, 247 yds, 2 TDs, 1 INT
Nebraska	Rushing	Dante Dowdell	6 car, 55 yds
Nebraska	Receiving	Carter Nelson	4 rec, 48 yds, 1 TD

=== vs No. 24 Illinois ===
No. 24 Illinois Fighting Illini (3–0) vs No. 22 Nebraska Cornhuskers (3–0) – Game summary

Quarter	1	2	3	4	OT	Total
No. 24 Fighting Illini	7	3	7	7	7	31
No. 22 Cornhuskers	10	7	0	7	0	24

at Memorial Stadium • Lincoln, Nebraska

- Date: September 20
- Game time: 7:00 PM
- Game weather: Sunny, 88 °F (31 °C), Wind: SE @ 15 miles per hour (24 km/h)
- Game attendance: 86,936
- Referee: Greg Blum
- TV announcers (FOX): Tim Brando (play-by-play), Devin Gardner (analyst), and Josh Sims (sideline reporter)
- Boxscore

Game information

First Quarter

- (11:54) ILL – Pat Bryant 27 yard pass from Luke Altmyer, David Olano kick (Drive: 6 plays, 78 yards, 2:08, Illinois 7–0)
- (3:15) NEB – John Hohl 21 yard field goal (Drive: 18 plays, 72 yards, 8:39, Illinois 7–3)
- (0:32) NEB – Isaiah Neyor 6 yard pass from Dylan Raiola, John Hohl kick (Drive: 4 plays, 37 yards, 2:09, Nebraska 10–7)

Second Quarter

- (11:37) ILL – David Olano 26 yard field goal (Drive: 8 plays, 62 yards, 3:48, 10–10)
- (0:16) NEB – Isaiah Neyor 11 yard pass from Dylan Raiola, John Hohl kick (Drive: 9 plays, 70 yards, 3:06, Nebraska 17–10)

Third Quarter

- (1:55) ILL – Tanner Arkin 3 yard pass from Luke Altmyer, David Olano kick (Drive: 11 plays, 57 yards, 5:00, 17–17)

Fourth Quarter

- (14:57) NEB – Janiran Bonner 1 yard pass from Dylan Raiola, John Hohl kick (Drive: 5 plays, 75 yards, 1:58, Nebraska 24–17)
- (10:36) ILL – Brandon Henderson 6 yard pass from Luke Altmyer, David Olano kick (Drive: 9 plays, 75 yards, 4:21, 24–24)

Overtime

- ILL – Pat Bryant 4 yard pass from Luke Altmyer, David Olano kick (Drive: 2 plays, 25 yards, Illinois 31–24)

Statistics	ILL	NEB
First downs	25	20
Total yards	66 / 381	68 / 345
Rushes/yards	166	48
Passing yards	215	297
Passing: Comp–Att–Int	21–27–0	24–35–1
Time of possession	29:39	30:21

Team	Category	Player	Statistics
Illinois	Passing	Luke Altmyer	21–27, 215 yds, 4 TD
Illinois	Rushing	Kaden Feagin	12 car, 69 yds
Illinois	Receiving	Pat Bryant	5 rec, 74 yds, 2 TD
Nebraska	Passing	Dylan Raiola	24–35, 297 yds, 3 TD, 1 INT
Nebraska	Rushing	Dante Dowdell	20 car, 72 yds
Nebraska	Receiving	Jahmal Banks	8 rec, 94 yds

=== at Purdue ===
Nebraska Cornhuskers (3–1) at Purdue Boilermakers (1–2) – Game summary

Quarter	1	2	3	4	Total
Cornhuskers	0	0	7	21	28
Boilermakers	0	0	3	7	10

at Ross–Ade Stadium • West Lafayette, Indiana

- Date: September 28
- Game time: 11:00 a.m.
- Game weather: Cloudy, 70 °F (21 °C), Wind: NE @ 11 miles per hour (18 km/h)
- Game attendance: 61,441
- Referee: Bryan Banks
- TV announcers (Peacock): Jac Collinsworth (play-by-play), Michael Robinson (analyst), and Caroline Pineda (sideline reporter)
- Boxscore

Game information

First Quarter

- No scoring plays

Second Quarter

- No scoring plays

Third Quarter

- (6:42) PUR – Spencer Porath 45 yard field goal (Drive: 13 plays, 55 yards, 8:08, Purdue 3–0)
- (2:49) NEB – Jahmal Banks 6 yard pass from Dylan Raiola, John Hohl kick (Drive: 9 plays, 70 yards, 3:53, Nebraska 7–3)

Fourth Quarter

- (10:34) NEB – Dante Dowdell 1 yard run, John Hohl kick (Drive: 10 plays, 63 yards, 5:30, Nebraska 14–3)
- (6:13) NEB – Jacory Barney Jr. 25 yard run, John Hohl kick (Drive: 8 plays, 67 yards, 2:57, Nebraska 21–3)
- (5:38) NEB – John Bullock 29 yard interception return, John Hohl kick (Drive: 2 plays, 3 yards, 0:35, Nebraska 28–3)
- (1:29) PUR – Leland Smith 15 yard pass from Hudson Card, Spencer Porath kick (Drive: 12 plays, 75 yards, 4:09, Nebraska 28–10)

Statistics	NEB	PUR
First downs	25	12
Total yards	59 / 418	56 / 224
Rushes/yards	32 / 161	31 / 50
Passing yards	257	174
Passing: Comp–Att–Int	17–27–0	18–25–1
Time of possession	30:18	29:42

Team	Category	Player	Statistics
Nebraska	Passing	Dylan Raiola	17–27, 257 yds, 1 TD
Nebraska	Rushing	Jacory Barney Jr.	4 car, 66 yds, 1 TD
Nebraska	Receiving	Jahmal Banks	5 rec, 82 yds, 1 TD
Purdue	Passing	Hudson Card	18–25, 174 yrds, 1 TD, 1 INT
Purdue	Rushing	Devin Mockobee	13 car, 41 yds
Purdue	Receiving	Jaron Tibbs	5 rec, 46 yds

=== vs Rutgers ===
Rutgers Scarlet Knights (4–0) vs Nebraska Cornhuskers (4–1) – Game summary

Quarter	1	2	3	4	Total
Scarlet Knights	0	0	0	7	7
Cornhuskers	7	7	0	0	14

at Memorial Stadium • Lincoln, Nebraska

- Date: October 5
- Game time: 3:00 PM
- Game weather: Sunny, 97 °F (36 °C), Wind: SW @ 19 miles per hour (31 km/h)
- Game attendance: 87,464
- Referee: Larry Smith
- TV announcers (FS1): Alex Faust (play-by-play) and Robert Smith (analyst)
- Box score

Game information

First Quarter

- (3:09) NEB – Dante Dowdell 1-yard run, John Hohl kick (Drive: 7 plays, 75 yards, 3:28, Nebraska 7–0)

Second Quarter

- (1:48) NEB – Janiran Bonner 11 yard run, John Hohl kick (Drive: 7 plays, 72 yards, 2:32, Nebraska 14–0)

Third Quarter

No scoring plays

Fourth Quarter

- (4:08) RUT – Ben Black 11 yard pass from Athan Kaliakmanis, Jai Patel kick (Drive: 9 plays, 50 yards, 3:40, Nebraska 14–7)

Statistics	RUTG	NEB
First downs	18	15
Total yards	69 / 264	70 / 261
Rushes/yards	32 / 78	42 / 97
Passing yards	186	164
Passing: Comp–Att–Int	15–37–2	14–28–1
Time of possession	28:25	31:35

Team	Category	Player	Statistics
Rutgers	Passing	Athan Kaliakmanis	15/37, 186 yds, 1TD, 2 INTs
Rutgers	Rushing	Kyle Monangai	19 car, 78 yds
Rutgers	Receiving	Ben Black	2 rec, 54 yds, 1 TD
Nebraska	Passing	Dylan Raiola	13/27, 134 yds, 1 INT
Nebraska	Rushing	Dante Dowdell	14 car, 57 yds, 1 TD
Nebraska	Receiving	Jaylen Lloyd	2 rec, 44 yds

=== at No. 16 Indiana ===
Nebraska Cornhuskers (5–1) at No. 16 Indiana Hoosiers (6–0) – Game summary

Quarter	1	2	3	4	Total
Cornhuskers	0	7	0	0	7
No. 16 Hoosiers	7	21	14	14	56

at Memorial Stadium • Bloomington, Indiana

- Date: October 19
- Game time: 11:00 AM
- Game weather: Sunny, 65 °F (18 °C), Wind SE @ 3 mph (5 km/h)
- Game attendance: 53,082
- Referee: Mark Kluczynski
- TV announcers (FOX): Gus Johnson (play-by-play), Joel Klatt (analyst), and Jenny Taft (sideline reporter)
- Box score

Game information

First Quarter

- (9:35) IU – Justice Ellison 5-yard run, Nicolas Radicic kick (Drive: 8 plays, 75 yards, 5:25, Indiana 7–0)

Second Quarter

- (13:37) IU – Myles Price 7-yard pass from Kurtis Rourke, Nicolas Radicic kick (Drive: 6 plays, 88 yards, 2:19, Indiana 14–0)
- (7:40) NU – Jacory Barney Jr. 7-yard run, John Hohl kick (Drive: 13 plays, 75 yards, 5:57, Indiana 14–7)
- (3:47) IU – Ty Son Lawton 1-yard run, Nicolas Radicic kick (Drive: 10 plays, 75 yards, 3:53, Indiana 21–7)
- (1:09) IU – Justice Ellison 31-yard run, Nicolas Radicic kick (Drive: 4 plays, 74 yards, 1:17, Indiana 28–7)

Third Quarter

- (6:25) IU – Miles Cross 2-yard pass from Tayven Jackson, Nicolas Radicic kick (Drive: 3 plays, 19 yards, 1:10, Indiana 35–7)
- (1:46) IU – Elijah Sarratt 15-yard pass from Tayven Jackson, Nicolas Radicic kick (Drive: 4 plays, 51 yards, 1:14, Indiana 42–7)

Fourth Quarter

- (13:01) IU – Kaelon Black 10-yard run, Nicolas Radicic kick (Drive: 4 plays, 43 yards, 1:55, Indiana 49–7)
- (3:45) IU – Elijah Green, 1-yard run, Nicolas Radicic kick (Drive 5 plays, 19 yards, 2:28, Indiana 56–7)

Statistics	NEB	IU
First downs	20	24
Total yards	75 / 304	63 / 495
Rushes/yards	29 / 70	33 / 215
Passing yards	234	280
Passing: Comp–Att–Int	28–46–3	24–30–1
Time of possession	32:08	27:52

Team	Category	Player	Statistics
Nebraska	Passing	Dylan Raiola	28–44, 234 yds, 3 INT
Nebraska	Rushing	Heinrich Haarberg	5 car, 32 yds
Nebraska	Receiving	Thomas Fidone II	6 rec, 91 yds
Indiana	Passing	Kurtis Rourke	17–21, 189 yds, 1 TD, 1 INT
Indiana	Rushing	Justice Ellison	9 car, 105 yds, 2 TD
Indiana	Receiving	Miles Cross	7 rec, 65 yds, 1 TD

=== at No. 4 Ohio State ===
Nebraska Cornhuskers (5–2) at No. 4 Ohio State Buckeyes (5–1) – Game summary

Quarter	1	2	3	4	Total
Cornhuskers	0	6	3	8	17
No. 4 Buckeyes	7	7	0	7	21

at Ohio Stadium • Columbus, Ohio

- Date: October 26
- Game time: 11:00 AM
- Game weather: Sunny, 56 °F (13 °C), Wind N @ 7 mph (11 km/h)
- Game attendance: 104,830
- Referee: Jeffrey Servinski
- TV announcers (FOX): Gus Johnson (play-by-play), Joel Klatt (analyst), and Jenny Taft (sideline reporter)
- Box score

Game information

First Quarter

- (0:29) OSU – Carnell Tate 40-yard pass from Will Howard, Jayden Fielding kick (Drive: 6 plays, 91 yards, 3:02, Ohio State 7–0)

Second Quarter

- (10:21) NEB – John Hohl 39-yard field goal (Drive: 10 plays, 54 yards, 5:08, Ohio State 7–3)
- (8:21) OSU – Jeremiah Smith 60-yard pass from Will Howard, Jayden Fielding kick (Drive: 4 plays, 75 yards, 2:00, Ohio State 14–3)
- (0:00) NEB – John Hohl 54-yard field goal (Drive: 8 plays, 40 yards, 2:02, Ohio State 14–6)

Third Quarter

- (7:29) NEB – John Hohl 47-yard field goal (Drive: 12 plays, 58 yards, 5:51, Ohio State 14–9)

Fourth Quarter

- (10:47) NEB – Dante Dowdell 1-yard run, Nate Boerkircher pass from Dylan Raiola (Drive: 9 plays, 74 yards, 4:06, Nebraska 17–14)
- (6:04) OSU – Quinshon Judkins 9-yard pass from Will Howard, Jayden Fielding kick (Drive: 8 plays, 75 yards, 4:43, Ohio State 21–17)

Statistics	NEB	OSU
First downs	18	11
Total yards	273	285
Rushes/yards	121	64
Passing yards	152	221
Passing: Comp–Att–Int	21–33–1	13–16–1
Time of possession	35:07	24:53

Team	Category	Player	Statistics
Nebraska	Passing	Dylan Raiola	21–32, 152 yards, 1 INT
Nebraska	Rushing	Dante Dowdell	14 car, 60 yards, 1 TD
Nebraska	Receiving	Thomas Fidone II	4 rec, 55 yards
Ohio State	Passing	Will Howard	13–16, 221 yards, 3 TD, 1 INT
Ohio State	Rushing	Quinshon Judkins	10 car, 29 yds
Ohio State	Receiving	Carnell Tate	4 rec, 102 yards, 1 TD

=== vs UCLA ===
UCLA Bruins (3–5) vs Nebraska Cornhuskers (5–3) – Game summary

Quarter	1	2	3	4	Total
Bruins	3	10	14	0	27
Cornhuskers	0	7	7	6	20

at Memorial Stadium • Lincoln, Nebraska

- Date: November 2
- Game time: 2:30 PM
- Game weather: Overcast, 56 °F (13 °C), Wind SE @ 11 mph (18 km/h)
- Game attendance: 87,453
- Referee: Jerry McGinn
- TV announcers (BTN): Guy Haberman, Yogi Roth, and Rhett Lewis
- Box score

Game information

First Quarter

- (7:00) UCLA – Mateen Bhaghani 25-yard field goal (Drive: 14 plays, 68 yards, 8:00, UCLA 3–0)

Second Quarter

- (13:47) UCLA – Jalen Berger 10-yard pass from Ethan Garbers, Mateen Bhaghani kick (Drive: 11 plays, 85 yards, 6:37, UCLA 10–0)
- (10:02) NEB – Dante Dowdell 4-yard run, John Hohl kick (Drive: 9 plays, 75 yards, 3:45, UCLA 10–7)
- (6:52) UCLA – Mateen Bhaghani 26-yard field goal (Drive: 7 plays, 67 yards, 3:10, UCLA 13–7)

Third Quarter

- (14:50) UCLA – Kain Medrano 38-yard interception return, Mateen Bhaghani kick (Drive: 0:10, UCLA 20–7)
- (8:21) UCLA – Kwazi Gilmer 48-yard pass from Ethan Garbers, Mateen Bhaghani kick (Drive: 3 plays, 58 yards, 1:42, UCLA 27–7)
- (5:23) NEB – Isaiah Neyor 8-yard pass from Dylan Raiola, John Hohl kick (Drive: 7 plays, 75 yards, 2:58, UCLA 27–14)

Fourth Quarter

- (3:57) NEB – Dante Dowdell 1-yard run, John Hohl kick missed (Drive: 13 plays, 53 yards, 6:01, UCLA 27–20)

Statistics	UCLA	NEB
First downs	17	21
Total yards	55 / 358	72 / 322
Rushes/yards	30 / 139	38 / 113
Passing yards	219	209
Passing: Comp–Att–Int	17–25–0	16–34–2
Time of possession	29:14	30:46

Team	Category	Player	Statistics
UCLA	Passing	Ethan Garbers	17–25, 219 yds, 2 TD
UCLA	Rushing	Ethan Garbers	6 car, 56 yds
UCLA	Receiving	Kwazi Gilmer	3 rec, 88 yds, 1 TD
Nebraska	Passing	Dylan Raiola	14–27, 177 yds, 1 TD, 1 INT
Nebraska	Rushing	Dante Dowdell	17 car, 61 yds, 2 TD
Nebraska	Receiving	Isaiah Neyor	4 rec, 89 yds, 1 TD

=== at USC ===
Nebraska Cornhuskers (5–4) at USC Trojans (4–5) – Game summary

Quarter	1	2	3	4	Total
Cornhuskers	7	7	6	0	20
Trojans	7	7	7	7	28

at Los Angeles Memorial Coliseum • Los Angeles, California

- Date: November 16
- Game time: 3:00 PM
- Game weather: Sunny, 66 °F (19 °C), Wind NW @ 3 mph (5 km/h)
- Game attendance: 75,304
- Referee: Kole Knueppel
- TV announcers (FOX): Jason Benetti (play-by-play), Brock Huard (analyst) and Allison Williams (sideline)
- Box score

Game information

First Quarter

- (9:37) NEB – Ceyair Wright 45-yard interception return, John Hohl kick (Drive: Nebraska 7–0)
- (5:04) USC – Zachariah Branch 6-yard pass from Jayden Maiava, Michael Lantz kick (Drive: 9 plays, 65 yards, 4:25, 7–7)

Second Quarter

- (13:05) USC – Kyron Hudson 12-yard pass from Jayden Maiava, Michael Lantz kick (Drive: 8 plays, 86 yards, 4:01, USC 14–7)
- (9:21) NEB – Emmett Johnson 29-yard pass from Dylan Raiola, John Hohl kick (Drive: 9 plays, 75 yards, 3:44, 14–14)

Third Quarter

- (9:37) NEB – John Hohl 29-yard field goal (Drive: 11 plays, 64 yards, 5:23, Nebraska 17–14)
- (7:15) USC – Duce Robinson 48-yard pass from Jayden Maiava, Michael Lantz kick (Drive: 5 plays, 75 yards, 2:22, USC 21–17)
- (2:09) NEB – John Hohl 30-yard field goal (Drive: 4 plays, 4 yards, 2:01 USC 21–20)

Fourth Quarter

- (2:45) USC – Jayden Maiava 2-yard rush, Michael Lantz kick (Drive: 13 plays, 84 yards, 7:39, USC 28–20)

Statistics	NEB	USC
First downs	19	22
Total yards	63 / 310 yds	67 / 441 yds
Rushes/yards	119	182
Passing yards	191	259
Passing: Comp–Att–Int	27–38–2	25–35–1
Time of possession	28:10	31:50

Team	Category	Player	Statistics
Nebraska	Passing	Dylan Raiola	27–38, 191 yds, 1 TD, 2 INT
Nebraska	Rushing	Emmett Johnson	10 car, 55 yds
Nebraska	Receiving	Jahmal Banks	5 rec, 55 yds
USC	Passing	Jayden Maiava	25–35, 259 yds, 3 TD, 1 INT
USC	Rushing	Woody Marks	19 car, 146 yds
USC	Receiving	Duce Robinson	4 rec, 90 yds, 1 TD

=== vs Wisconsin ===
Wisconsin Badgers (5–5) vs Nebraska Cornhuskers (5–5) – Game summary

Quarter	1	2	3	4	Total
Badgers	7	3	7	8	25
Cornhuskers	7	17	10	10	44

at Memorial Stadium • Lincoln, Nebraska

- Date: November 23
- Game time: 2:30 PM
- Game weather: Sunny, 60 °F (16 °C), Wind S @ 10 mph (16 km/h)
- Game attendance: 86,923
- Referee: Ron Snodgrass
- TV announcers (BTN): Jeff Levering (play-by-play), Jake Butt (analyst), Brooke Fletcher (sideline)
- Box score

Game information

First Quarter

- (12:07) NEB – Heinrich Haarberg 5-yard run, John Hohl kick (Drive: 6 plays, 55 yards, 2:44, Nebraska 7–0)
- (8:52) WIS – Bryson Green 4-yard pass from Braedyn Locke, Nathaniel Vakos kick (Drive: 6 plays, 82 yards, 3:11, 7–7)

Second Quarter

- (14:18) NEB – Dante Dowdell 12-yard rush, John Hohl kick (Drive: 8 plays, 80 yards, 3:45, Nebraska 14–7)
- (9:58) WIS – Nathaniel Vakos 33-yard field goal (Drive: 7 plays, 32 yards, 4:12, Nebraska 14–10)
- (0:17) NEB – Jahmal Banks 5-yard pass from Dylan Raiola, John Hohl kick (Drive: 10 plays, 76 yards, 3:00, Nebraska 21–10)
- (0:02) NEB – John Hohl 37-yard field goal (Drive: 2 plays, 12 yards, 0:09, Nebraska 24–10)

Third Quarter

- (11:18) NEB – John Hoh 45-yard field goal (Drive: 9 plays, 46 yards, 2:44, Nebraska 27–10)
- (3:07) NEB – Dante Dowdell 3-yard run, John Hohl kick (Drive: 7 plays, 74 yards, 3:18, Nebraska 34–10)
- (1:19) WIS – Bryson Green 24-yard pass from Braedyn Locke, Nathaniel Vakos kick (Drive: 4 plays, 79 yards, 1:44, Nebraska 34–17)

Fourth Quarter

- (10:52) NEB – John Hohl 26-yard field goal (Drive: 11 plays, 67 yards, 5:27, Nebraska 37–17)
- (8:30) WIS – Vinny Anthony II 58-yard pass from Braedyn Locke, Bryson Green PAT pass from Braedyn Locke (Drive: 5 plays, 75 yards, 2:22, Nebraska 37–25)
- (3:11) NEB – Dante Dowdell 1-yard rush, John Hohl kick (Drive: 10 plays, 75 yards, 5:19, Nebraska 44–25)

Statistics	WIS	NEB
First downs	15	29
Total yards	55 / 407 yds	74 / 473 yds
Rushes/yards	115	180
Passing yards	292	293
Passing: Comp–Att–Int	20–30–1	28–38–0
Time of possession	26:53	33:07

Team	Category	Player	Statistics
Wisconsin	Passing	Braedyn Locke	20–30, 292 yds, 3 TD, 1 INT
Wisconsin	Rushing	Darrion Dupree	8 car, 63 yds
Wisconsin	Receiving	Vinny Anthony II	7 rec, 137 yds, 1 TD
Nebraska	Passing	Dylan Raiola	28–38, 293 yds, 1 TD
Nebraska	Rushing	Emmett Johnson	16 car, 113 yds
Nebraska	Receiving	Jacory Barney Jr.	9 rec, 85 yds

=== at Iowa ===
Nebraska Cornhuskers (6–5) at Iowa Hawkeyes (7–4) – Game summary

Quarter	1	2	3	4	Total
Cornhuskers	3	7	0	0	10
Hawkeyes	0	0	3	10	13

at Kinnick Stadium • Iowa City, Iowa

- Date: November 29
- Game time: 6:30 PM
- Game weather: Clear, 20 degrees, Wind NW @ 8 mph
- Game attendance: 69,250
- Referee: Chris Coyte
- TV announcers (NBC): Paul Burmeister (play-by-play), Colt McCoy (analyst), Zora Stephenson (sideline)
- Box score

Game information

First Quarter

- (7:28) NEB – John Hohl 31-yard field goal (Drive: 10 plays, 64 yards, 5:23, Nebraska 3–0)

Second Quarter

- (0:38) NEB – Dante Dowdell 1-yard run, John Hohl kick (Drive: 12 plays, 74 yards, 4:01, Nebraska 10–0)

Third Quarter

- (4:30) IA – Drew Stevens 20-yard field goal (Drive: 4 plays, 2 yards, 2:06, Nebraska 10–3)

Fourth Quarter

- (14:44) IA – Kaleb Johnson 72-yard pass from Jackson Stratton, Drew Stevens kick (Drive: 3 plays, 86 yards, 1:02, 10–10)
- (0:00) IA – Drew Stevens 53-yard field goal (Drive: 3 plays, 1 yard, 0:20, Iowa 13–10)

Statistics	NEB	IOWA
First downs	20	5
Total yards	76 / 334 yds	41 / 164 yds
Rushes/yards	43 car / 144	26 car / 49
Passing yards	190	115
Passing: Comp–Att–Int	22–33–0	8–15–0
Time of possession	39:01	20:59

Team	Category	Player	Statistics
Nebraska	Passing	Dylan Raiola	22–32, 190 yds
Nebraska	Rushing	Emmett Johnson	18 car, 71 yds
Nebraska	Receiving	Jahmal Banks	4 rec, 41 yds
Iowa	Passing	Jackson Stratton	8–15, 115 yds, 1 TD
Iowa	Rushing	Kaleb Johnson	17 car, 45 yds
Iowa	Receiving	Kaleb Johnson	2 rec, 73 yds, 1 TD

=== vs. Boston College (Pinstripe Bowl) ===
2024 Bad Boy Mowers Pinstripe Bowl
Boston College Eagles (7–5) vs. Nebraska Cornhuskers (6–6) – Game summary

Quarter	1	2	3	4	Total
Eagles	0	2	0	13	15
Cornhuskers	0	13	7	0	20

at Yankee Stadium • Bronx, New York

- Date: Saturday, December 28, 2024
- Game time: 11:00 a.m. CST
- Game weather: Cloudy • Temperature: 41 °F (5 °C) • Wind: 2 mph (3.2 km/h) west
- Game attendance: 30,062
- Referee: Daniel Gautreaux
- TV announcers (ABC): Mike Monaco (play-by-play), Kirk Morrison (analyst), and Dawn Davenport (sideline)

Game information

First quarter

- (14:56) NEB – Rahmir Johnson 4-yard run, John Hohl kick (Drive: 15 plays, 75 yards, 6:32; Nebraska 7–0)
- (3:39) NEB – Kwinten Ives 2-yard run, John Hohl kick (Drive: 7 plays, 67 yards, 2:46; Nebraska 13–0)
- (3:39) BC – Ashton McShane defensive PAT conversion (Drive: 7 plays, 67 yards, 2:46; Nebraska 13–2)

Second quarter

- No scoring.

Third quarter

- (3:02) NEB – Emmett Johnson 13-yard pass from Dylan Raiola, John Hohl kick (Drive: 7 plays, 50 yards, 3:12; Nebraska 20–2)

Fourth quarter

- (6:11) BC – Turbo Richard 1-yard run, 2-point pass conversion failed (Drive: 8 plays, 64 yards, 2:52; Nebraska 20–8)
- (4:18) BC – Jordan McDonald 2-yard run, Liam Connor kick (Drive: 1 plays, 2 yards, 0:04; Nebraska 20–15)

Statistics	BC	NEB
First downs	20	20
Total yards	348	363
Rushes/yards	26/47	29/127
Passing yards	301	236
Passing: Comp–Att–Int	26–41–0	24–32–1
Time of possession	28:44	31:16

Team	Category	Player	Statistics
Boston College	Passing	Grayson James	26–41, 301 yds
Boston College	Rushing	Grayson James	9 car, 22 yds
Boston College	Receiving	Lewis Bond	7 rec, 99 yds
Nebraska	Passing	Dylan Raiola	23–31, 228 yds, 1 TD, 1 INT
Nebraska	Rushing	Emmett Johnson	14 car, 68 yds
Nebraska	Receiving	Jahmal Banks	4 rec, 79 yds

== Big Ten awards ==
=== Player of the week honors ===
Weekly awards
Player	Award	Week awarded	Ref.
Dylan Raiola	Big Ten Freshman of the Week	Week 1	
Brian Buschini	Big Ten Special Teams Player of the Week	Week 6	
Jacory Barney Jr.	Big Ten Freshman of the Week	Week 13	

=== All-Conference awards ===
2024 Big Ten offense all-conference teams and awards

Coaches All-Big Ten
Position	Player	Team
DL	Ty Robinson	Third team
OT	Bryce Benhart	Honorable mention
LB	John Bullock	Honorable mention
P	Brian Buschini	Honorable mention
CB	Malcolm Hartzog Jr.	Honorable mention
DT	Nash Hutmacher	Honorable mention

Media All-Big Ten
Position	Player	Team
DL	Ty Robinson	Third team
LB	John Bullock	Honorable mention
P	Brian Buschini	Honorable mention
CB	Malcolm Hartzog Jr.	Honorable mention
DT	Nash Hutmacher	Honorable mention
C	Ben Scott	Honorable mention
S	DeShon Singleton	Honorable mention

== Personnel ==
=== Main Roster ===
2024 Nebraska Cornhusker Football
Quarterbacks: 10 Heinrich Haarberg – (redshirt) Junior (6'5, 225); 15 Dylan Raiola – Freshman (6'3, 230); Running backs: 14 Rahmir Johnson – Graduate (5'10,200); 21 Emmett Johnson – (redshirt) Sophomore (5'11, 200); 22 Gabe Ervin – (redshirt) Junior (6'0, 220); 23 Dante Dowdell – Sophomore (6'2, 225); Wide receivers: 4 Jahmal Banks – (redshirt) Senior (6'4, 220); 16 Janiran Bonner – (redshirt) Sophomore (6'2, 220); 17 Jacory Barney – Freshman (6'0, 170); 18 Isaiah Neyor – Graduate (6'4, 220); 19 Jaylen Lloyd – Sophomore (5'10,180); 29 Carter Nelson – Freshman (6'5, 230); 84 Alex Bullock – (redshirt) Junior (6'1, 200); Tight ends: 24 Thomas Fidone – (redshirt) Junior (6'5, 255); 44 Luke Lindenmeyer – (redshirt) Sophomore (6'3, 250); 87 Nate Boerkircher – (redshirt) Senior (6'5, 250); Offensive Lineman: 51 Justin Evans – (redshirt) Sophomore (6'1, 315) -G; 54 Bryce Benhart – Graduate (6'9, 315) -T; 56 Micah Mazzucca – Senior (6'5, 325) -G/T; 59 Henry Lutovsky – (redshirt) Junior (6'6, 320) -G; 62 Sam Sledge – (redshirt) Freshman (6'4, 295) -C; 66 Ben Scott – Graduate (6'5, 310) -C; 75 Tyler Knaak – (redshirt) Sophomore (6'6, 320) -G/T; 76 Jason Maciejczak – (redshirt) Freshman (6'2, 305) -G; 77 Gunnar Gottula – (redshirt) Freshman (6'5, 305) -T; 79 Grant Seagren – (redshirt) Freshman (6'6, 300) -T	Defensive Lineman: 0 Nash Hutmacher – (redshirt) Senior (6'3, 310) -DT; 9 Ty Robinson – Graduate (6'5, 300) -DT; 10 Jimari Butler – (redshirt) Senior (6'5, 260) -DE; 11 Cameron Lenhardt - Sophomore (6'3, 260) -DE; 16 Elijah Jeudy – (redshirt) Junior (6'3, 285) -DT; 44 Riley Van-Poppel - Sophomore (6'5, 290) -DT; 90 James Williams – (redshirt) Sophomore (6'5, 250) -DE; 97 Keona Davis – Freshman (6'5, 255) -DT; Linebackers: 1 Vincent Shavers – Freshman (6'1, 225); 5 John Bullock – Graduate (6'0, 230); 17 Willis McGahee IV – Freshman (6'1, 235) -JK; 18 Princewill Umanmielen – Sophomore (6'4, 245) -JK; 33 Javin Wright – Graduate (6'5, 230); 42 Mikai Gbayor – (redshirt) Junior (6'2, 230); 48 MJ Sherman – (redshirt) Senior (6'3, 245) -JK; 56 Stefon Thompson – (redshirt) Senior (6'1, 240); Defensive backs: 2 Isaac Gifford – (redshirt) Senior (6'1, 205); 3 Marques Buford – (redshirt) Junior (5'11, 190); 6 Tommi Hill – Senior (6'0, 205); 7 Malcolm Hartzog – Junior (5'9,180); 8 DeShon Singleton – (redshirt) Junior (6'3, 210); 14 Amare Sanders – Freshman (6'1,175); 15 Ceyair Wright – (redshirt) Junior (6'0,180); 25 Jeremiah Chalres – (redshirt) Freshman (5'11,170); 26 Koby Bretz – (redshirt) Junior (6'2, 205); 29 Mario Buford – Freshman (6'0,175); 32 Rahmir Stewart – (redshirt) Freshman (5'11, 210); Special Teams: 13 Brian Buschini – (redshirt) Senior (6'1, 225) -P; 90 John Hohl – (redshirt) Freshman (6'0,180) -K; 96 Camden Witucki – (redshirt) Junior (6'2, 230 ) -LS
Legend: (C) Team captain; (S) Suspended; (I) Ineligible; Injured; Redshirt

=== Full Roster ===
2024 Nebraska Cornhuskers football team roster
Players
Coaches
Offense

Pos.	#	Name	Class
WR	4	Jahmal Banks	Sr
QB	10	Heinrich Haarberg	Jr
WR	11	Demitrius Bell (injured)	RFr
QB	11	Bode Soukup	Fr
QB	12	Daniel Kaelin	Fr
WR	13	Isaiah Garcia-Castaneda	Sr
RB	14	Rahmir Johnson	GS
QB	15	Dylan Raiola	Fr
WR	16	Janiran Bonner	So
QB	17	Luke Longval	So
WR	17	Jacory Barney Jr.	Fr
WR	18	Isaiah Neyor	GS
QB	19	Jalyn Gramstad	Sr
WR	19	Jaylen Lloyd	So
RB	21	Emmett Johnson	So
RB	22	Gabe Ervin Jr.	Jr
RB	23	Dante Dowdell	So
TE	24	Thomas Fidone II	Jr
RB	25	Kenneth Williams	RFr
WR	26	Roman Mangini	So
RB	28	Kwinten Ives	RFr
TE/WR	29	Carter Nelson	Fr
WR	30	DJ Singleton	Fr
RB	31	Ryker Evans	Fr
RB	32	Trent Uhlir	Fr
RB	33	Maurice Mazzccua	Sr
FB	34	Barret Liebentritt	Jr
RB	35	Mekhi Nelson	Fr
FB	40	Trevor Ruth	So
RB	40	Rowdy Bauer	Fr
WR	41	Elliott Brown	Sr
TE	44	Luke Lindenmeyer	So
RB	45	Izaac Dickey	Fr
TE	46	Connor Schutt	Fr
TE	47	Ian Flynt	Fr
TE	48	Cayden Echternach	RFr
TE	49	Danny King	Fr
OL	50	Landen Davidson	Fr
OL	51	Justin Evans-Jenkins	So
OL	54	Bryce Benhart	GS
OL	56	Micah Mazzccua	Sr
OL	58	Jake Peters	Fr
OL	59	Henry Lutovsky	Jr
OL	62	Sam Sledge	RFr
OL	63	Grant Brix	Fr
OL	65	Teddy Prochazka (injured)	Jr
OL	66	Ben Scott	GS
OL	67	Joey Mancino	Jr
OL	68	Preston Taumua	Fr
OL	69	Turner Corcoran (injured)	Sr
OL	70	Nolan Fennessy	Fr
OL	71	Jacob Hood	So
OL	72	Gibson Pyle	Fr
OL	73	Xander Ruggeroli	Fr
OL	74	Brock Knutson	RFr
OL	75	Tyler Knaak	So
OL	76	Jason Maciejczak	RFr
OL	77	Gunnar Gottula	RFr
OL	78	Jacob Brandl	RFr
OL	79	Grant Seagren	RFr
WR	80	Malachi Coleman	So
WR	81	Hayes Miller	So
TE	82	Eric Ingwerson	Fr
WR	83	Dae'Vonn Hall	Fr
WR	84	Alex Bullock	Jr
WR	85	Keelan Smith	Fr
TE	86	A. J. Rollins	Jr
TE	87	Nate Boerkircher	Sr
WR	88	Isaiah McMorris	Fr
WR	88	Cooper Hausmann	So
WR	89	Quinn Clark	Fr
TE	89	Mac Markway (injured)	So

Defense

Pos.	#	Name	Class
DL	0	Nash Hutmacher	Sr
LB	1	Vincent Shavers Jr.	Fr
S	2	Isaac Gifford	Sr
CB	3	Marques Buford Jr.	Jr
LB	5	John Bullock	GS
CB	6	Tommi Hill	Sr
S	7	Malcom Hartzog	Jr
S	8	DeShon Singleton	Sr
DL	9	Ty Robinson	GS
DL	10	Jimari Butler	Sr
DL	11	Cameron Lenhardt	So
CB	12	Jaidyn Doss	RFr
CB	14	Amare Sanders	Fr
DB	14	Kahmir Prescott	Fr
CB	15	Ceyair Wright	Jr
DL/FB	16	Elijah Jeudy	Jr
LB	17	Willis McGahee IV	Fr
LB	18	Princewill Umanmielen	So
CB	21	Dwight Bootle II	RFr
LB	22	Maverick Noonan	RFr
CB	23	Blye Hill	So
S	24	Derek Branch	Jr
CB	25	Jeremiah Charles	RFr
S	26	Koby Bretz	Jr
DB	28	Caleb Benning	Fr
DB	29	Braylen Prude	Fr
LB	30	Vincent Genatone	So
S	31	Mario Buford	Fr
S	32	Rahmir Stewart	RFr
LB	33	Javin Wright	GS
DB	34	Preston Okafor	Fr
LB	34	Gage Wager	RFr
DB	35	D'Andre Barnes	RFr
S	36	Blake Closman	Jr
DB	37	Donovan Jones	Fr
DB	37	Evan Taylor	Fr
DB	38	Cooper Wilson	RFr
DB	39	Taveon Thompson	Jr
DB	40	Brice Turner	RFr
DB	41	Larry Traver	Fr
LB	42	Mikai Gbayor	Jr
LB	43	Michael Booker III	Jr
DL	44	Riley Van-Poppel	So
DB	44	Syncere Safeeullah	RFr
DB	45	Roger Gradney (injured)	Fr
DB	45	Mason Jones	RFr
DB	46	Thomas D'Onofrio	Fr
LB	46	Derek Wacker	RFr
LB	47	Gage Stenger	So
LB	48	MJ Sherman	Sr
DB	49	Rex Guthrie	Fr
LB	50	Noah Bustard	RFr
LB	51	Danny Pasko	RFr
LB	52	Dylan Rogers	RFr
DL	53	David Hoffken	Fr
LB	54	Jacob Bower	RFr
DL	55	Vincent Jackson	RFr
LB	56	Stefon Thompson	Sr
DL	57	Ashton Murphy	Fr
DL	58	Mason Goldman	RFr
LB	59	Grant Buda	Jr
DL	73	David Borchers	RFr
LB	81	Ismael Smith-Flores	RFr
DL	87	Brodie Tagaloa	So
DL	90	James Williams	So
DL	92	Sua Lefotu	RFr
DL	93	Kai Wallin	So
DL	94	Jordan Ochoa	Fr
LB	95	Ethan Duda	Fr
DL	96	Leslie Black	RFr
DL	97	Keona Davis	Fr
DL	98	Conor Connealy	RFr
DL	99	Dylan Parrott	So

Special teams

Pos.	#	Name	Class
P	13	Brian Buschini	Sr
PK	30	Tristan Alvano	So
P	37	Kamdyn Koch	Fr
PK	90	John Hohl	RFr
PK	91	Nico Ottomanelli	Fr
LS	94	Aiden Flege	Jr
LS	96	Camden Witucki	Jr

Head coach

- Matt Rhule

Coordinators/assistant coaches

- Tony White – Associate head coach/defensive coordinator
- Marcus Satterfield – Offensive coordinator/tight ends
- Glenn Thomas – Co-offensive coordinator/quarterbacks
- Ed Foley – Special teams coordinator
- E. J. Barthel – Running backs
- John Butler – Secondary/defensive pass game coordinator
- Rob Dvoracek – Linebackers
- Terrance Knighton – Defensive line
- Garret McGuire – Wide receivers
- Donovan Raiola – Offensive line
- Ron Brown – Fullbacks/returners
- Corey Campbell – Strength and conditioning coach

Legend

- (C) Team captain
- (S) Suspended
- (I) Ineligible
- Injured
- Redshirt

Roster

=== Depth chart ===
Defense

ROVER
2 Isaac Gifford
32 Rahmir Stewart
⋅

FS
7 Malcolm Hartzog
31/29 Mario Buford
⋅

JACK	LB	LB
48 MJ Sherman	42 Mikai Gbayor	5 John Bullock
18 Princewill Umanmielen	33 Javin Wright	1 Vincent Shavers
17 Willis McGahee IV	56 Stefon Thompson	⋅

SS
8 DeShon Singleton
26 Koby Bretz
⋅

CB
3 Marques Buford
25 Jeremiah Charles
⋅

DE	NT	DE
10 Jimari Butler	0 Nash Hutmacher	9 Ty Robinson
11 Cameron Lenhardt	16 Elijah Jeudy	97 Keona Davis
90 James Williams	⋅	⋅

CB
6 Tommi Hill (injured)
15 Ceyair Wright
14 Amare Sanders
⋅

Offense

WR
4 Jahmal Banks
19 Jaylen Lloyd
⋅

WR
17 Jacory Barney
16 Janiran Bonner
29 Carter Nelson

LT	LG	C	RG	RT
77 Gunnar Gottula	51 Justin Evans	66 Ben Scott	59 Henry Lutovsky	54 Bryce Benhart
56 Micah Mazzccua; 79 Grant Seagren	76 Jason Maciejczak	62 Sam Sledge	75 Tyler Knaak	74 Brock Knutson
⋅	⋅	⋅	⋅	⋅

TE
24 Thomas Fidone
87 Nate Boerkircher
44 Luke Lindenmeyer

WR
18 Isaiah Neyor
84 Alex Bullock
⋅

QB
15 Dylan Raiola
10 Heinrich Haarberg
12 Daniel Kaelin

Key reserves
Season-ending injury Number of games played ()
WR Demitrius Bell (0)
OT Teddy Prochazka (0)
OT Turner Corcoran (4)

Special teams
PK John Hohl
P Brian Buschini
KR Jacory Barney
PR Isaiah Garcia-Castaneda
LS Camden Witucki

RB
23 Dante Dowdell
21 Emmett Johnson
14 Rahmir Johnson
22 Gabe Ervin
