= 2024 Pinstripe Bowl =

Postseason college football bowl game

2024 Bad Boy Mowers Pinstripe Bowl
- 14th Pinstripe Bowl
Boston College Eagles	Nebraska Cornhuskers
(7–5)	(6–6)
ACC	Big Ten
15	20
Head coach: Bill O'Brien	Head coach: Matt Rhule
	1	2	3	4	Total
Boston College	0	2	0	13	15
Nebraska	0	13	7	0	20
- Date: December 28, 2024
- Season: 2024
- Stadium: Yankee Stadium
- Location: Bronx, New York
- MVP: Rahmir Johnson (RB, Nebraska)
- Favorite: Nebraska by 3.5
- Referee: Daniel Gautreaux (SEC)
- Attendance: 30,062

United States TV coverage
- Network: ABC (Note: ABC station WCVB in Boston aired the Pinstripe Bowl locally on its secondary MeTV subchannel due to existing commitments to simulcast coverage of a New England Patriots home game.); ESPN Radio
- Announcers: Mike Monaco (play-by-play), Kirk Morrison (analyst), and Dawn Davenport (sideline) (ABC); Chris Carlin (play-by-play) and Steve Addazio (analyst) (ESPN Radio)

The 2024 Pinstripe Bowl, known as the Bad Boy Mowers Pinstripe Bowl for sponsorship purposes, was the fourteenth edition of the college football bowl game, played on December 28, 2024, at Yankee Stadium in New York City, New York. Part of the 2024–25 bowl season, the game featured Boston College and Nebraska, and aired at noon EST on ABC.

== Teams ==
=== Boston College ===
Boston College was 7–5 in the regular season and 4–4 in ACC play.

=== Nebraska ===
Nebraska finished its regular season 6–6, 3–6 in Big Ten play. The Cornhuskers won their first three games to reach the national top twenty-five for the first time since 2019, but lost five of their final six games.

== Game ==
2024 Bad Boy Mowers Pinstripe Bowl

Quarter	1	2	3	4	Total
Boston College	0	2	0	13	15
Nebraska	0	13	7	0	20

at Yankee Stadium • Bronx, New York

- Date: Saturday, December 28, 2024
- Game time: 12:07 p.m. EST
- Game weather: Cloudy • Temperature: 41 °F (5 °C) • Wind: 2 mph (3.2 km/h) west
- Game attendance: 30,062
- Referee: Daniel Gautreaux
- TV announcers (ABC): Mike Monaco (play-by-play), Kirk Morrison (analyst), and Dawn Davenport (sideline)
- Box score

Game information

First quarter

- (14:56) NU – Rahmir Johnson 4-yard run, John Hohl kick (Drive: 15 plays, 75 yards, 6:32; Nebraska 7–0)
- (3:39) NU – Kwinten Ives 2-yard run, Hohl kick (Drive: 7 plays, 67 yards, 2:46; Nebraska 13–0)
- (3:39) BC – Ashton McShane defensive PAT conversion (Drive: 7 plays, 67 yards, 2:46; Nebraska 13–2)

Second quarter

- No scoring.

Third quarter

- (3:02) NU – Emmett Johnson 13-yard pass from Dylan Raiola, Hohl kick (Drive: 7 plays, 50 yards, 3:12; Nebraska 20–2)

Fourth quarter

- (6:11) BC – Turbo Richard 1-yard run, pass failed (Drive: 8 plays, 64 yards, 2:52; Nebraska 20–8)
- (4:18) BC – Jordan McDonald 2-yard run, Liam Connor kick (Drive: 1 plays, 2 yards, 0:04; Nebraska 20–15)

=== Statistics ===
Statistics	BC	NU
First downs	20	21
Plays–yards	88–348	64–363
Rushes–yards	26–47	32–127
Passing yards	301	236
Passing: comp–att–int	26–41–0	24–32–1
Turnovers		
Time of possession	28:44	31:16

Team	Category	Player	Statistics
Boston College	Passing	Grayson James	26/41, 301 yards
Boston College	Rushing	Grayson James	9 carries, 22 yards
Boston College	Receiving	Lewis Bond	7 receptions, 99 yards
Nebraska	Passing	Dylan Raiola	26/41, 301 yards
Nebraska	Rushing	Emmett Johnson	14 carries, 68 yards
Nebraska	Receiving	Jahmal Banks	4 receptions, 79 yards
