= Nate Boerkircher =

American football player (born 2001)

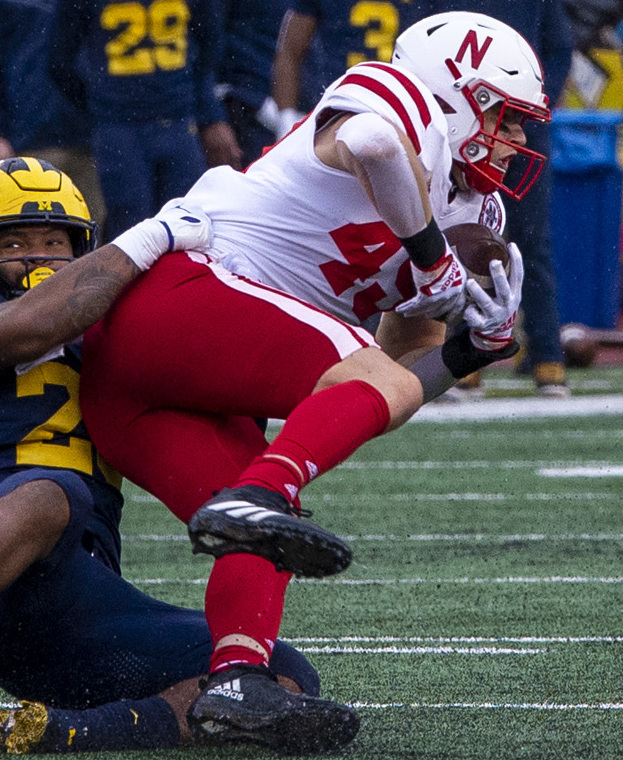

No. 87 – Jacksonville Jaguars
- Position: Tight end
- Roster status: Active

Personal information
- Born: September 4, 2001 (age 25)
- Listed height: 6 ft 5 in (1.96 m)
- Listed weight: 250 lb (113 kg)

Career information
- High school: Aurora (Aurora, Nebraska)
- College: Nebraska (2020–2024); Texas A&M (2025)
- NFL draft: 2026: 2nd round, 56th overall pick

Career history
- Jacksonville Jaguars (2026–present)

Career NFL statistics as of Week 10, 2026
- Receptions: 10
- Receiving yards: 156
- Receiving touchdowns: 2
- Stats at Pro Football Reference

Nate Boerkircher (born September 4, 2001) is an American professional football tight end for the Jacksonville Jaguars of the National Football League (NFL). He played college football for the Nebraska Cornhuskers and Texas A&M Aggies and was selected by the Jaguars in the second round of the 2026 NFL draft.

== Early life ==
Boerkircher is from Aurora, Nebraska. He has a brother, Ian, who also played college football as a walk-on for the Nebraska Cornhuskers. He attended Aurora High School where he played football as a tight end, defensive end and linebacker, although he was limited by a knee issue which he did not fully recover from until his junior year. As a sophomore and junior, he had a total of eight receptions for 101 yards and two touchdowns.

Boerkircher helped Aurora to the NSAA Class C1 championship as a junior and scored two touchdowns in the game. He posted 22 receptions for 269 yards and three touchdowns as a senior, being named all-state by the Omaha World-Herald. He received little attention as a recruit, only having one scholarship offer from an NCAA Division II school, and committed to play for the Nebraska Cornhuskers as a walk-on.

== College career ==
As a true freshman in 2020, Boerkircher saw no playing time, and in 2021, he redshirted, appearing in three games. He caught six passes for 52 yards and a touchdown while starting four games in 2022. In 2023, he was placed on scholarship. That year, he appeared in all 12 games and caught five passes for 51 yards. Boerkircher was a starter for the Cornhuskers during the 2024 season. He finished the season with six receptions for 102 yards.

Boerkircher transferred to the Texas A&M Aggies for his final season in 2025. He caught a touchdown pass which helped the Aggies defeat eighth-ranked Notre Dame and was a nominee for the Burlsworth Trophy, given to the best player who started as a walk-on.

=== Statistics ===
Year	Team	GP	Receiving			
Year	Team	GP	Rec	Yds	Avg	TD
2020	Nebraska	0	Did not play			
2021	Nebraska	3	2	14	7.0	0
2022	Nebraska	12	6	52	8.7	1
2023	Nebraska	12	5	51	10.2	0
2024	Nebraska	12	6	102	17.0	0
2025	Texas A&M	13	19	198	10.4	3
Career		52	38	417	11.0	4

== Professional career ==
Pre-draft measurables
Height	Weight	Arm length	Hand span	Wingspan	40-yard dash	10-yard split	20-yard split	20-yard shuttle	Three-cone drill	Vertical jump
6 ft 5 1/2 in (1.97 m)	245 lb (111 kg)	32 5/8 in (0.83 m)	10 1/2 in (0.27 m)	6 ft 7 1/8 in (2.01 m)	4.79 s	1.58 s	2.66 s	4.32 s	7.03 s	32.0 in (0.81 m)
All values from NFL Combine/Pro Day

Boerkircher was selected by the Jacksonville Jaguars in the second round (56th overall) of the 2026 NFL draft. In Week 6 against the Houston Texans, Boerkircher recorded his first career touchdown on a one–handed, one–yard reception from Trevor Lawrence.
