= Dante Dowdell =

American football player (born 2005)

No. 22 – Georgia Bulldogs
- Position: Running back
- Class: Senior

Personal information
- Born: March 7, 2005 (age 21)
- Listed height: 6 ft 2 in (1.88 m)
- Listed weight: 225 lb (102 kg)

Career information
- High school: Picayune Memorial (Picayune, Mississippi)
- College: Oregon (2023); Nebraska (2024); Kentucky (2025); Georgia (2026–present)
- Stats at ESPN

Dante Dowdell (born March 7, 2005) is an American college football running back for the Georgia Bulldogs of the Southeastern Conference (SEC). He previously played for the Oregon Ducks, Nebraska Cornhuskers, and Kentucky Wildcats.

== Early life ==
Dowdell grew up in Picayune, Mississippi and attended Picayune Memorial High School. He rushed for 2,555 yards and 28 touchdowns during his junior season. Dowdell was named MHSAA 5A Mr. Football as a senior after rushing for 2,165 yards and 31 touchdowns. After the season he played in the 2023 All-American Bowl. Dowdell was rated a four-star recruit and committed to play college football at Oregon over offers from Texas A&M, Ole Miss, Mississippi State, Penn State, and Auburn.

== College career ==
Dowdell began his career at Oregon. As a freshman, he played in six games and rushed for 90 yards and one touchdown. Following the end of the season Dowdell entered the NCAA transfer portal. On January 7, 2024, Dowdell announced that he would be transferring to Nebraska. He has three years of college eligibility remaining. On January 2, 2026, Dowdell entered the transfer portal.

On January 12, 2026, Dowdell announced his decision to transfer to the University of Georgia to play for the Georgia Bulldogs. On July 21st he was involved in a ATV accident causing serious injuries.

=== Statistics ===
College statistics
Season	Team	Games	Rushing				Receiving			
Season	Team	GP	Att	Yards	Avg	TD	Rec	Yards	Avg	TD
2023	Oregon	6	17	90	5.3	1	–	–	–	–
2024	Nebraska	12	143	614	4.3	12	7	21	3.0	0
2025	Kentucky	12	112	560	5.0	3	7	30	4.3	0
Career		30	272	1,264	4.6	16	14	51	3.6	0
