= Isaiah Neyor =

American football player (born 2001)

No. 80 – Green Bay Packers
- Position: Wide receiver
- Roster status: Practice squad

Personal information
- Born: June 7, 2001 (age 25); Fort Worth, Texas, U.S.
- Listed height: 6 ft 4 in (1.93 m)
- Listed weight: 218 lb (99 kg)

Career information
- High school: Lamar (Arlington, Texas)
- College: Wyoming (2020–2021); Texas (2022–2023); Nebraska (2024)
- NFL draft: 2025: undrafted

Career history
- San Francisco 49ers (2025)*; Green Bay Packers (2025–present)
- * Offseason or practice squad member only

Awards and highlights
- Second-team All-Mountain West (2021)
- Stats at Pro Football Reference

Isaiah Neyor (born June 7, 2001) is an American professional football wide receiver for the Green Bay Packers of the National Football League (NFL). He played college football for the Wyoming Cowboys, Texas Longhorns, and Nebraska Cornhuskers.

== Early life ==
Neyor grew up in Fort Worth, Texas and attended Lamar High School. As a senior he had 39 receptions for 858 yards and eight touchdowns. Neyor committed to play college football at Wyoming over offers from FCS programs Incarnate Word and Western Illinois and from Division II Henderson State.

== College career ==
=== Wyoming ===
As a freshman, he caught eight passes for 248 yards for an average of 31 yards in six games played. Neyor was named second team All-Mountain West Conference in 2021 after finishing the season with 44 receptions for 878 yards and 12 touchdowns. Following the end of the season, he entered his name into the NCAA transfer portal. Neyor initially committed to transfer to the University of Tennessee after considering offers from Ole Miss and USC. He flipped his commitment to the University of Texas and signed with the school two weeks after his commitment to Tennessee.

=== Texas ===
Neyor suffered a torn anterior cruciate ligament during preseason training camp entering his first season at Texas.

On December 8, 2023, Neyor announced that he would be entering the transfer portal for the second time.

=== Nebraska ===
On January 5, 2024, Neyor announced that he would be transferring to Nebraska.

On December 27, 2024, Neyor announced that he would enter the transfer portal for the third time. On January 1, 2025, Neyor announced that he would transfer to Louisville, however three days later on January 4, he announced that he would withdraw his name from the portal and remain with Nebraska for the 2025 season.

=== College statistics ===
Season	Team	Games	Receiving				Rushing			
Season	Team	Games	Rec	Yds	Avg	TD	Att	Yds	Avg	TD
2020	Wyoming	5	8	248	31.0	0	1	58	58.0	0
2021	Wyoming	13	44	878	20.0	12	12	23	1.9	1
2022	Texas (Note: Suffered a season ending ACL injury before the start of his junior season.)	0	0	0	0	0	0	0	0	0
2023	Texas	1	1	14	14.0	0	0	0	0	0
2024	Nebraska	4	16	277	17.3	4	1	13	13.0	0
Career		23	69	1,417	20.5	16	14	94	6.7	1

== Professional career ==
Pre-draft measurables
Height	Weight	Arm length	Hand span	Wingspan	40-yard dash	10-yard split	20-yard split	20-yard shuttle	Three-cone drill	Vertical jump	Broad jump
6 ft 4 1/4 in (1.94 m)	218 lb (99 kg)	34 3/8 in (0.87 m)	9 1/2 in (0.24 m)	6 ft 10 5/8 in (2.10 m)	4.40 s	1.51 s	2.55 s	4.27 s	7.00 s	38.0 in (0.97 m)	11 ft 1 in (3.38 m)
All values from NFL Combine/Pro Day

=== San Francisco 49ers ===
Neyor signed with the San Francisco 49ers as an undrafted free agent on April 27, 2025. On August 4, 2025, he was waived.

=== Green Bay Packers ===
On August 6, 2025, Neyor was signed by the Green Bay Packers. He was released on August 26 as part of final roster cuts and signed to the practice squad the next day. On January 10, 2026, Neyor was elevated to the active roster as a game-day elevation for Green Bay's Wild Card round matchup against the Chicago Bears. He signed a reserve/future contract on January 13, 2026.

On August 30, 2026, Neyor was released by the Packers as a part of final roster cuts. A day later, he was signed to the Packers' practice squad.
