= John Bullock (American football) =

American football player (born 2001)

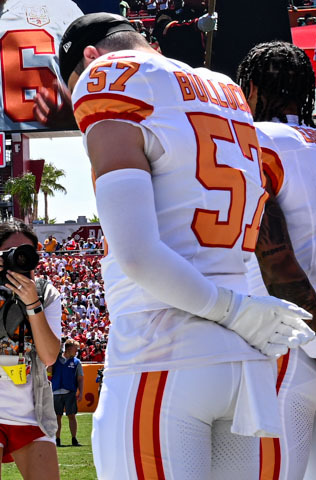
- Bullock in 2025

Profile
- Position: Linebacker

Personal information
- Born: April 22, 2001 (age 25); Omaha, Nebraska, U.S.
- Listed height: 6 ft 0 in (1.83 m)
- Listed weight: 230 lb (104 kg)

Career information
- High school: Creighton Preparatory School (Omaha, Nebraska)
- College: Nebraska (2019–2024)
- NFL draft: 2025: undrafted

Career history
- Tampa Bay Buccaneers (2025); Indianapolis Colts (2026)*; Tampa Bay Buccaneers (2026)*
- * Offseason or practice squad member only

Career NFL statistics as of Week 15, 2025
- Tackles: 9
- Stats at Pro Football Reference

John Bullock (born April 22, 2001) is an American professional football linebacker. He played college football for the Nebraska Cornhuskers.

== Early life ==
Bullock was born in Omaha, Nebraska, and attended Creighton Preparatory School, where he was a defensive standout and an all-metro selection. He would commit to play college football at Nebraska.

== College career ==
Bullock joined Nebraska as a walk-on in 2019 and redshirted his first season. He played extensively on special teams in 2021–2022 before moving to linebacker for the 2023 season; head coach Matt Rhule later placed him on scholarship in 2023.

In 2024, Bullock started all 13 games and recorded 70 tackles, 10 tackles for loss, four sacks, five pass breakups, two forced fumbles, and an interception. Following the season, he received Nebraska's Cornhusker Award, presented to a player who began as a walk-on and made the largest contribution in his final season of eligibility.

== Professional career ==
Pre-draft measurables
Height	Weight	Arm length	Hand span	Wingspan	40-yard dash	10-yard split	20-yard split	20-yard shuttle	Three-cone drill	Vertical jump	Broad jump	Bench press
6 ft 0 in (1.83 m)	224 lb (102 kg)	30 in (0.76 m)	9 in (0.23 m)	6 ft 2 in (1.88 m)	4.65 s	1.65 s	2.70 s	4.55 s	7.14 s	32 in (0.81 m)	9 ft 9 in (2.97 m)	21 reps
All values from Pro Day

=== Tampa Bay Buccaneers ===
After going undrafted in the 2025 NFL draft, Bullock signed with the Tampa Bay Buccaneers as an undrafted free agent on May 9, 2025. During the preseason, he registered notable plays, including a 12-yard sack against the Pittsburgh Steelers on August 16. In Week 16 against the Carolina Panthers, he committed a dead-ball unnecessary roughness penalty, causing the Buccaneers to start a critical fourth quarter drive at their 10-yard line. On January 2, 2026, Bullock was waived.

=== Indianapolis Colts ===
On January 5, 2026, Bullock was claimed off waivers by the Indianapolis Colts. On May 7, Bullock was waived by the Colts.

=== Tampa Bay Buccaneers (second stint) ===
On May 8, 2026, Bullock was claimed off waivers by the Tampa Bay Buccaneers. He was waived by the Buccaneers on August 29.

== Personal life ==
Bullock's younger brother, Alex, has played wide receiver at Nebraska.
