= Ty Robinson =

American football player (born 2001)

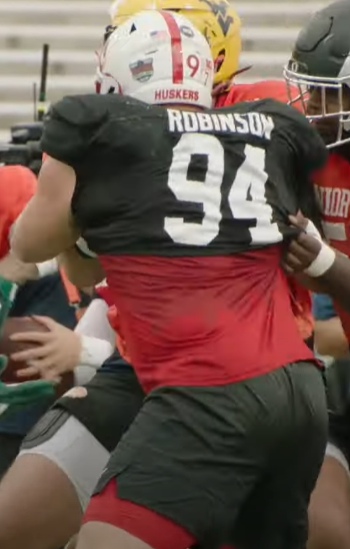
- Robinson at the 2025 Senior Bowl

No. 95 – Philadelphia Eagles
- Position: Defensive tackle
- Roster status: Active

Personal information
- Born: May 3, 2001 (age 25)
- Listed height: 6 ft 5 in (1.96 m)
- Listed weight: 288 lb (131 kg)

Career information
- High school: Higley (Gilbert, Arizona)
- College: Nebraska (2019–2024)
- NFL draft: 2025: 4th round, 111th overall pick

Career history
- Philadelphia Eagles (2025–present)

Awards and highlights
- Third-team All-Big Ten (2024)

Career NFL statistics
- Tackles: 5
- Stats at Pro Football Reference

Ty Robinson (born May 3, 2001) is an American professional football defensive tackle for the Philadelphia Eagles of the National Football League (NFL). He played college football for the Nebraska Cornhuskers and was selected by the Eagles in the fourth round of the 2025 NFL draft.

== Early life ==
Robinson attended Higley High School in Gilbert, Arizona. He was rated as a four-star recruit and held offers from schools such as Alabama, Nebraska, Oregon, Stanford, and USC. Ultimately, Robinson committed to play college football for the Nebraska Cornhuskers.

== College career ==
In first five collegiate seasons from 2019 to 2023, Robinson appeared in 47 games for the Cornhuskers, where he totaled 97 tackles with 14 being for a loss, five sacks, eight pass deflections, and a fumble recovery. For his performance during his breakout 2024 season, Robinson was named third-team all Big-Ten.

== Professional career ==
Robinson accepted an invite to play in the 2025 Reese's Senior Bowl.

Pre-draft measurables
Height	Weight	Arm length	Hand span	Wingspan	40-yard dash	10-yard split	20-yard split	20-yard shuttle	Three-cone drill	Vertical jump	Broad jump	Bench press
6 ft 5 1/8 in (1.96 m)	288 lb (131 kg)	32 1/4 in (0.82 m)	10 in (0.25 m)	6 ft 7 in (2.01 m)	4.83 s	1.71 s	2.80 s	4.50 s	7.58 s	33.5 in (0.85 m)	9 ft 11 in (3.02 m)	28 reps
All values from NFL Combine

Robinson was selected by the Philadelphia Eagles in the fourth round (111th overall) in the 2025 NFL draft.

== Personal life ==
During his time at the University of Nebraska, Robinson majored in Nutrition and Health Sciences. During the 2020 college football season, which was shortened due to the COVID-19 pandemic, Robinson had to balance his credit hours with college football practices because of the schedule change(s). Robinson credits finishing his pre-med schoolwork as being a large reason why he was able to emerge as a football player. Robinson says he wants to go into pediatrics when he is done with football.
