= Emmett Johnson =

American football player (born 2003)

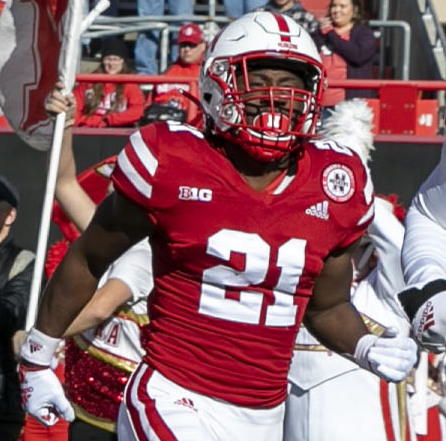
- Johnson with Nebraska in 2022

No. 10 – Kansas City Chiefs
- Position: Running back
- Roster status: Active

Personal information
- Born: October 10, 2003 (age 23)
- Listed height: 5 ft 11 in (1.80 m)
- Listed weight: 200 lb (91 kg)

Career information
- High school: Academy of Holy Angels (Richfield, Minnesota)
- College: Nebraska (2022–2025)
- NFL draft: 2026: 5th round, 161st overall pick

Career history
- Kansas City Chiefs (2026–present)

Awards and highlights
- First-team All-American (2025); Big Ten Running Back of the Year (2025); First-team All-Big Ten (2025)

Career NFL statistics as of Week 10, 2026
- Rushing yards: 212
- Rushing average: 4.4
- Rushing touchdowns: 1
- Receptions: 20
- Receiving yards: 307
- Receiving touchdowns: 3
- Stats at Pro Football Reference

Emmett Johnson (born October 10, 2003) is an American professional football running back for the Kansas City Chiefs of the National Football League (NFL). He played college football for the Nebraska Cornhuskers and was selected by the Chiefs in the fifth round of the 2026 NFL draft.

== Early life ==
Johnson was born on October 10, 2003 and grew up in the Minneapolis area. He began playing football at the age of eight, primarily at Powderhorn Park in southern Minneapolis. In addition to football, Johnson also grew up playing basketball. He later attended Academy of Holy Angels in Richfield, Minnesota. As a senior, he rushed for 2,484 yards on 326 carries, totaling 42 touchdowns, being named the 2021 Minnesota Mr. Football. A three-star recruit, Johnson committed to play college football at the University of Nebraska–Lincoln.

== College career ==
Johnson redshirted in 2022, before rushing for 411 yards and two touchdowns in 2023. The following season, his production increased, recording 113 yards rushing and 85 yards receiving against Wisconsin. His 113 rushing yards against the Badgers were significant, as it was the first time a Nebraska running back recorded over 100 rushing yards in a game since Anthony Grant recorded 135 yards rushing against Louisiana Tech on September 23, 2023. Johnson finished the season rushing for 598 yards and a touchdown, while also receiving for 286 yards and two touchdowns.

=== 2025 season ===
He entered the 2025 season as the Cornhusker's starting running back. In the season opener against Cincinnati, Johnson totaled a then-career-high 25 carries for 108 yards and 135 total yards from scrimmage in a 20–17 victory. The following week, Johnson recorded a then-career-high 140 rushing yards and three total touchdowns in Nebraska's 68-0 victory against Akron. His back-to-back 100-yard rushing games made him the first Nebraska player to rush for 100 yards in consecutive games since Anthony Grant in 2022. Johnson recorded a career-high three rushing touchdowns and led the team with six receptions in Nebraska's 38-27 comeback victory against Michigan State.

The following week, Johnson had his most significant contribution as a Cornhusker thus far in Nebraska's 34-31 victory against Maryland. He totaled a then-career-high 176 rushing yards and 196 total yards from scrimmage. In the fourth quarter, with the Cornhuskers trailing 31-24, Johnson erupted for a then career-long 50-yard rush to set up the game-tying touchdown at the Terrapins ten yard line. Johnson's 176 rushing yards were the most in a single game by a Nebraska running back since Anthony Grant's 189 rushing yards against North Dakota in 2022, and it was the most by a Nebraska running back in a Big Ten Conference game since Dedrick Mills' 191 rushing yards against Rutgers in 2020. During Nebraska's 21-17 loss against USC, Johnson once again broke his career-high in rushing attempts with 29 and recorded 165 rushing yards and one rushing touchdown. It was Johnson's fifth 100-yard rushing game of the season, and his 165 rushing yards against the Trojans made him the first Nebraska running back to rush for 1,000 yards in a season since Divine Ozigbo in 2018.

The following week, Johnson recorded 28 carries for 128 rushing yards and one rushing touchdown, while also catching three receptions for 103 yards and two touchdowns in Nebraska's 28-21 win against UCLA. His 232 total yards from scrimmage were a career-high, and he became the first Nebraska player in program history to rush for 100 yards and receive for 100 yards in the same game. Additionally, Johnson became the first Big Ten Conference player in at least 30 years to record 125 rushing yards, 100 receiving yards, a rushing touchdown and two receiving touchdowns in a single game. Johnson was named the Big Ten Offensive Player of the Week and the Maxwell Club National Player of the Week for his performance against the Bruins. After rushing for 103 yards and catching 48 yards through the air in Nebraska's 37-10 loss against Penn State the following week, Johnson had his most dominant rushing performance in a Cornhusker uniform in the regular season finale against Iowa. Johnson recorded 29 carries for a career-high 217 rushing yards, becoming the first Nebraska player to rush for 200 yards in a single game since Ameer Abdullah rushed for 225 yards against Rutgers in 2014. Johnson's 217 rushing yards against the Hawkeyes marked his fifth consecutive 100-yard rushing game and eighth of the season.

After the conclusion of the regular season, he was named first-team All-Big Ten by the conference's coaches and media, and Big Ten Running Back of the Year, the first Nebraska running back to win the award. On the national level, Johnson was named as a semifinalist for both the Doak Walker Award and Maxwell Award. Johnson was named first-team All-American by Sports Illustrated, The Sporting News, CBS Sports and On3. He was named second-team All-American by the Associated Press and Walter Camp Football Foundation. Johnson's first-team All-America selection was the first by a Nebraska player since Lavonte David in 2011, and the first by a Nebraska running back since Mike Rozier in 1983. Johnson's 1,451 rushing yards ranks eighth all-time in Nebraska program history for most rushing yards in a single season. His eight 100-yard rushing games were the most in a single season by a Nebraska running back since Ameer Abdullah in 2013.

On December 5, 2025, Johnson declared for the 2026 NFL draft. On April 25, 2026, he was selected by the Kansas City Chiefs with the 161st overall pick in the fifth round.

=== Statistics ===
College statistics
Season	Team	Games		Rushing				Receiving			
Season	Team	GP	GS	Att	Yds	Avg	TD	Rec	Yds	Avg	TD
2022	Nebraska	4	0	Redshirted (redshirt)							
2023	Nebraska	12	6	90	411	4.6	2	7	46	6.6	0
2024	Nebraska	13	5	117	598	5.1	1	39	286	7.3	2
2025	Nebraska	12	12	251	1,451	5.8	12	46	370	8.0	3
Career		41	23	458	2,460	5.4	15	92	702	7.6	5

== Professional career ==
Pre-draft measurables
Height	Weight	Arm length	Hand span	Wingspan	40-yard dash	10-yard split	20-yard split	20-yard shuttle	Three-cone drill	Vertical jump	Broad jump	Bench press
5 ft 10 1/4 in (1.78 m)	202 lb (92 kg)	30 1/4 in (0.77 m)	9 3/4 in (0.25 m)	6 ft 2 3/8 in (1.89 m)	4.50 s	1.60 s	2.56 s	4.29 s	7.32 s	35.5 in (0.90 m)	10 ft 0 in (3.05 m)	16 reps
All values from NFL Combine/Pro Day

Johnson was selected by the Kansas City Chiefs in the fifth round with the 161st overall pick of the 2026 NFL draft.

== Personal life ==
Johnson is of Liberian descent. His parents, Charles Sr. and Precious, are both immigrants from Liberia, who fled the country as a result of the First Liberian Civil War.
