= Jahmal Banks =

American football player (born 2001)

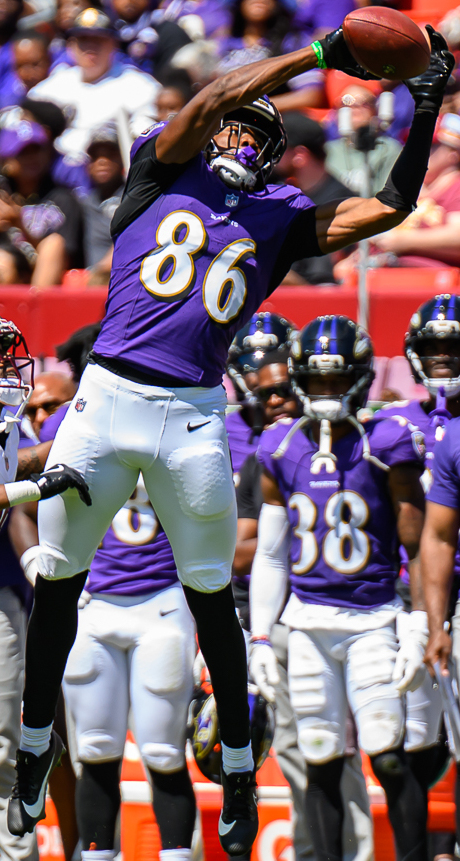
- Banks with the Baltimore Ravens in 2025

Profile
- Position: Wide receiver

Personal information
- Born: October 2, 2001 (age 25); Washington, D.C., U.S.
- Listed height: 6 ft 4 in (1.93 m)
- Listed weight: 220 lb (100 kg)

Career information
- High school: St. Frances Academy (Baltimore, Maryland)
- College: Wake Forest (2020–2023); Nebraska (2024)
- NFL draft: 2025: undrafted

Career history
- Baltimore Ravens (2025)*; Winnipeg Blue Bombers (2026)*
- * Offseason or practice squad member only
- Stats at Pro Football Reference

Jahmal Banks (born October 2, 2001) is an American professional football wide receiver. He played college football for the Wake Forest Demon Deacons and Nebraska Cornhuskers.

== Early life ==
Banks attended Saint Frances Academy in Baltimore, Maryland. A three-star recruit, Banks committed to Wake Forest University to play college football.

== College career ==
=== Wake Forest ===
Banks played sparingly in his first two seasons, recording six receptions for 98 yards in 2021

The following season, Banks scored his first career touchdown in the season opener against VMI. He finished the season with 42 receptions for 636 yards and nine touchdowns.

The following season, Banks tallied 59 receptions for 653 yards and four touchdowns. On December 8, 2023, Banks announced that he would be entering the transfer portal. He finished his time at Wake Forest hauling in 107 receptions for 1,404 yards and 13 touchdowns.

=== Nebraska ===
On January 11, 2024, Banks announced that he would be transferring to the University of Nebraska–Lincoln to play for the Nebraska Cornhuskers.

=== College statistics ===
Season	Team	Games	Receiving			
Season	Team	GP	Rec	Yards	Avg	TD
2020	Wake Forest	5	1	17	17.0	0
2021	Wake Forest	14	6	98	16.3	0
2022	Wake Forest	12	42	636	15.1	9
2023	Wake Forest	12	59	653	11.1	4
2024	Wake Forest	13	44	587	13.3	3
Career		56	151	1,991	13.2	16

== Professional career ==
Pre-draft measurables
Height	Weight
6 ft 3 5/8 in (1.92 m)	220 lb (100 kg)
Values from Pro Day

=== Baltimore Ravens ===
Banks signed with the Baltimore Ravens as an undrafted free agent on May 4, 2025. He was waived on August 26, as part of final roster cuts.

On September 24, 2025, Banks was suspended six games by the NFL due to undisclosed reasons.

=== Winnipeg Blue Bombers ===
On January 1, 2026, Banks signed with the Winnipeg Blue Bombers of the Canadian Football League. He was released on May 13.
