= 2021 Nebraska Cornhuskers football team =

American college football season

2021 Nebraska Cornhuskers football
- Conference: Big Ten Conference
- West
- Record: 3–9 (1–8 Big Ten)
- Head coach: Scott Frost (4th season)
- Offensive coordinator: Matt Lubick (2nd season)
- Offensive scheme: Spread option
- Defensive coordinator: Erik Chinander (4th season)
- Base defense: 3–4
- Home stadium: Memorial Stadium

2021 Big Ten Conference football standings
	Conf.			Overall
Team	W		L	W		L
East Division
No. 3 Michigan xy$^	8	–	1	12	–	2
No. 6 Ohio State x	8	–	1	11	–	2
No. 9 Michigan State	7	–	2	11	–	2
Penn State	4	–	5	7	–	6
Maryland	3	–	6	7	–	6
Rutgers	2	–	7	5	–	8
Indiana	0	–	9	2	–	10
West Division
No. 23 Iowa xy	7	–	2	10	–	4
Minnesota	6	–	3	9	–	4
Wisconsin	6	–	3	9	–	4
Purdue	6	–	3	9	–	4
Illinois	4	–	5	5	–	7
Nebraska	1	–	8	3	–	9
Northwestern	1	–	8	3	–	9
Championship: Michigan 42, Iowa 3
^ – College Football Playoff participant; $ – Conference champion; x – Division champion/co-champions; y – Championship game participant; Rankings from AP Poll

The 2021 Nebraska Cornhuskers football team represented the University of Nebraska as a member of the West Division of the Big Ten Conference during the 2021 NCAA Division I FBS football season. The team was led by fourth-year head coach Scott Frost and played its games at Memorial Stadium in Lincoln, Nebraska. The 2021 Nebraska Cornhuskers were the first team in Division I history to lose nine games by single digits, six of which came against ranked teams (three against Top 10 teams).

== Offseason ==
=== 2021 NFL draft ===
The following players declared for the 2021 NFL draft:

Name	Number	Position	Height	Weight	Class	Hometown
Dicaprio Bootle	#7	CB	5'10"	195	Senior	Miami, FL
Matt Farniok	#71	OL	6'6"	330	Senior	Sioux Falls, SD
Brenden Jaimes	#76	OT	6'5"	300	Senior	Austin, TX
Dedrick Mills	#26	RB	5'11"	220	Senior	Waycross, GA
Jack Stoll	#86	TE	6'4"	260	Senior	Lone Tree, CO

=== Transfers ===
==== Outgoing ====
Name	Number	Position	Height	Weight	Class	Hometown	Destination
David Alston	#45	LB	6'4"	235	Junior	St. Paul, MN	Montana State
Matthew Anderson	#72	OL	6'6"	255	Sophomore	Leesville, LA	Louisiana-Lafayette
Jared Bubak	#80	TE	6'5"	245	Graduate	Lincoln, NE	Central Missouri
Niko Cooper	#32	LB	6'5"	225	Junior	Memphis, TN	Western Kentucky
Ronald Delancy III	#0	CB	5'11"	160	Freshman	Miami, FL	Toledo
Will Farniok	#68	OL	6'3"	295	Junior	Sioux Falls, SD	Tulsa
Marcus Fleming	#6	WR	5'10"	160	Freshman	Miami, FL	Maryland
Jimmy Fritzsche	#78	OL	6'7"	290	Sophomore	Greenville, SC	TBD
Jamin Graham	#89	DL	6'4"	265	Sophomore	Attalla, AL	Jacksonville State
Keem Green	#4	DL	6'4"	320	Senior	Sumter, SC	South Carolina
Demariyon Houston	#10	WR	6'0"	180	Sophomore	Oklahoma City, OK	Missouri
Austin Jablonski	#47	WR	6'2"	215	Sophomore	Lincoln, NE	Concordia (NE)
Luke McCaffrey	#7	QB	6'2"	200	Sophomore	Highlands Ranch, CO	Rice
Caden McCormack	#59	LB	6'0"	235	Sophomore	Lincoln, NE	Nebraska–Kearney
Jamie Nance	#3	WR	6'0"	180	Sophomore	Blanchard, OK	Utah State
Ryan Novosel	#32	K	6'0"	160	Freshman	Wilmette, IL	Georgetown
Kurt Rafdal	#82	TE	6'7"	245	Senior	Carmel, IN	Boise State
Wan'Dale Robinson	#1	WR	5'10"	185	Junior	Frankfort, KY	Kentucky
Ronald Thompkins	#25	RB	5'11"	195	Sophomore	Loganville, GA	Retired
Kade Warner	#81	WR	6'1"	210	Senior	Scottsdale, AZ	Kansas State
Boe Wilson	#56	OL	6'3"	300	Graduate	Lee's Summit, MO	Western Kentucky
Branson Yager	N/A	OL	6'8"	330	Freshman	Grantsville, UT	TBD

==== Incoming ====
Name	Position	Height	Weight	Class	Hometown	Previous
Chancellor Brewington	WR	6'3"	185	Junior	Chandler, AZ	Northern Arizona
Kyan Brumfield	DB	6'0"	185	Senior	San Antonio, TX	Texas Tech
Brendan Franke	K	6'3"	235	Sophomore	Gretna, NE	Morningside
Josh Jasek	K	6'1"	175	Sophomore	Iowa City, IA	Iowa Western
Tyreke Johnson	DB	6'1"	190	Junior	Jacksonville, FL	Ohio State
Chris Kolarevic	LB	6'1"	225	Junior	Traverse City, MI	Northern Iowa
Markese Stepp	RB	6'0"	235	Junior	Indianapolis, IN	USC
Samori Toure	WR	6'3"	190	Graduate	Portland, OR	Montana

=== Recruits ===
The Cornhuskers signed a total of 20 scholarship recruits and 20 walk-ons during national signing period.

==== Scholarship recruits ====
College recruiting (2021)
Name	Hometown	School	Height	Weight	Commit date
Koby Bretz; DB	Omaha, NE	Omaha Westside	6 ft 2 in (1.88 m)	195 lb (88 kg)	Aug 24, 2020
Koby Bretz; DB	Recruit ratings: Rivals: 247Sports: ESPN: (73)				
Ru'Quan Buckley; DE	Wyoming, MI	Godwin Heights	6 ft 5 in (1.96 m)	280 lb (130 kg)	Dec 6, 2020
Ru'Quan Buckley; DE	Recruit ratings: Rivals: 247Sports: ESPN: (78)				
Marques Buford Jr. DB	DeSoto, TX	Trinity Christian School / St. Thomas More	6 ft 0 in (1.83 m)	190 lb (86 kg)	Jul 18, 2020
Marques Buford Jr. DB	Recruit ratings: Rivals: 247Sports: ESPN: (76)				
James Carnie; TE	Roca, NE	Norris	6 ft 5 in (1.96 m)	220 lb (100 kg)	Oct 12, 2020
James Carnie; TE	Recruit ratings: Rivals: 247Sports: ESPN: (76)				
Gabe Ervin Jr. RB	Buford, GA	Buford	6 ft 1 in (1.85 m)	190 lb (86 kg)	Jun 23, 2020
Gabe Ervin Jr. RB	Recruit ratings: Rivals: 247Sports: ESPN: (76)				
Thomas Fidone II; TE	Council Bluffs, IA	Lewis Central	6 ft 5 in (1.96 m)	220 lb (100 kg)	Aug 26, 2020
Thomas Fidone II; TE	Recruit ratings: Rivals: 247Sports: ESPN: (81)				
Mikai Gbayor; LB	Irvington, NJ	Irvington	6 ft 2 in (1.88 m)	220 lb (100 kg)	Sep 4, 2020
Mikai Gbayor; LB	Recruit ratings: Rivals: 247Sports: ESPN: (76)				
Kamonte Grimes; WR	Naples, FL	Palmetto Ridge	6 ft 3 in (1.91 m)	200 lb (91 kg)	Aug 16, 2020
Kamonte Grimes; WR	Recruit ratings: Rivals: 247Sports: ESPN: (80)				
Heinrich Haarberg; QB	Kearney, NE	Kearney Catholic	6 ft 5 in (1.96 m)	190 lb (86 kg)	May 9, 2020
Heinrich Haarberg; QB	Recruit ratings: Rivals: 247Sports: ESPN: (78)				
Shawn Hardy II; WR	Kingsland, GA	Camden County	6 ft 3 in (1.91 m)	190 lb (86 kg)	May 29, 2020
Shawn Hardy II; WR	Recruit ratings: Rivals: 247Sports: ESPN: (79)				
Wynden Ho'ohuli; LB	Mililani, HI	Mililani	6 ft 3 in (1.91 m)	220 lb (100 kg)	Jan 2, 2021
Wynden Ho'ohuli; LB	Recruit ratings: Rivals: 247Sports: ESPN: (83)				
Randolph Kpai; LB	Sioux Falls, SD	Sioux Falls Washington	6 ft 3 in (1.91 m)	185 lb (84 kg)	Jan 2, 2020
Randolph Kpai; LB	Recruit ratings: Rivals: 247Sports: ESPN: (83)				
Henry Lutovsky; OL	Crawfordsville, IA	Mount Pleasant	6 ft 6 in (1.98 m)	320 lb (150 kg)	Nov 17, 2019
Henry Lutovsky; OL	Recruit ratings: Rivals: 247Sports: ESPN: (78)				
Seth Malcolm; LB	Tabor, IA	Fremont-Mills	6 ft 3 in (1.91 m)	205 lb (93 kg)	Jun 6, 2020
Seth Malcolm; LB	Recruit ratings: Rivals: 247Sports: ESPN: (73)				
Latrell Neville; WR	Fresno, TX	Hightower	6 ft 4 in (1.93 m)	195 lb (88 kg)	Jul 4, 2020
Latrell Neville; WR	Recruit ratings: Rivals: 247Sports: ESPN: (78)				
Teddy Prochazka; OL	Omaha, NE	Elkhorn South	6 ft 9 in (2.06 m)	280 lb (130 kg)	Sep 28, 2019
Teddy Prochazka; OL	Recruit ratings: Rivals: 247Sports: ESPN: (79)				
AJ Rollins; TE	Omaha, NE	Creighton Prep	6 ft 6 in (1.98 m)	230 lb (100 kg)	Aug 28, 2020
AJ Rollins; TE	Recruit ratings: Rivals: 247Sports: ESPN: (76)				
Jailen Weaver; DL	Antioch, CA	Antioch	6 ft 8 in (2.03 m)	320 lb (150 kg)	Oct 31, 2020
Jailen Weaver; DL	Recruit ratings: Rivals: 247Sports: ESPN: (74)				
Malik Williams; DB	Atlanta, GA	Buford	6 ft 0 in (1.83 m)	190 lb (86 kg)	Jul 21, 2020
Malik Williams; DB	Recruit ratings: Rivals: 247Sports: ESPN: (73)				
Branson Yager; OL	Grantsville, UT	Grantsville	6 ft 8 in (2.03 m)	330 lb (150 kg)	Apr 27, 2020
Branson Yager; OL	Recruit ratings: Rivals: 247Sports: ESPN: (76)				
Overall recruit ranking: Rivals: 19 247Sports: 24 ESPN: 39
Note: In many cases, Scout, Rivals, 247Sports, On3, and ESPN may conflict in their listings of height and weight.; In these cases, the average was taken. ESPN grades are on a 100-point scale.; Sources: "Nebraska Football Commitments". Rivals.; "ESPN". ESPN.; "2021 Team Ranking". Rivals.com.

==== Walk-on recruits ====
College recruiting (2021)
Name	Hometown	School	Height	Weight	Commit date
Michael Booker III; DB	Grand Prairie, TX	South Grand Prairie	6 ft 1 in (1.85 m)	195 lb (88 kg)	Feb 1, 2021
Michael Booker III; DB	Recruit ratings: Rivals: 247Sports: ESPN:				
Derek Branch; DB	Lincoln, NE	Lincoln Southeast	5 ft 11 in (1.80 m)	175 lb (79 kg)	Sep 28, 2020
Derek Branch; DB	Recruit ratings: Rivals: 247Sports: ESPN:				
Grant Buda; WR/LB	Lincoln, NE	Lincoln Southwest	5 ft 11 in (1.80 m)	190 lb (86 kg)	Jan 30, 2021
Grant Buda; WR/LB	Recruit ratings: Rivals: 247Sports: ESPN:				
Alex Bullock; WR	Omaha, NE	Creighton Prep	6 ft 2 in (1.88 m)	190 lb (86 kg)	Nov 23, 2020
Alex Bullock; WR	Recruit ratings: Rivals: 247Sports: ESPN:				
Maddox Burton; DL	Lincoln, NE	Lincoln Southeast	6 ft 5 in (1.96 m)	290 lb (130 kg)	Jan 30, 2021
Maddox Burton; DL	Recruit ratings: Rivals: 247Sports: ESPN:				
Blake Closman; DB	Omaha, NE	Millard North	5 ft 10 in (1.78 m)	190 lb (86 kg)	Dec 1, 2020
Blake Closman; DB	Recruit ratings: Rivals: 247Sports: ESPN:				
AJ Collins; DB	Omaha, NE	Creighton Prep	5 ft 10 in (1.78 m)	170 lb (77 kg)	Oct 31, 2020
AJ Collins; DB	Recruit ratings: Rivals: 247Sports: ESPN:				
Sam Hoskinson; OL	Omaha, NE	Elkhorn South	6 ft 0 in (1.83 m)	245 lb (111 kg)	Dec 14, 2020
Sam Hoskinson; OL	Recruit ratings: Rivals: 247Sports: ESPN:				
CJ Lilienkamp; S	Bellevue, NE	Bellevue West	6 ft 1 in (1.85 m)	190 lb (86 kg)	Jan 2, 2021
CJ Lilienkamp; S	Recruit ratings: Rivals: 247Sports: ESPN:				
Grant Lohr; RB/S	Jenks, OK	Jenks	6 ft 1 in (1.85 m)	190 lb (86 kg)	Feb 2, 2021
Grant Lohr; RB/S	Recruit ratings: Rivals: 247Sports: ESPN:				
Joey Mancino; OL	Holmdel, NJ	Holmdel	6 ft 3 in (1.91 m)	300 lb (140 kg)	Jan 30, 2021
Joey Mancino; OL	Recruit ratings: Rivals: 247Sports: ESPN:				
Kelen Meyer; PK	Ord, NE	Ord	6 ft 3 in (1.91 m)	190 lb (86 kg)	Oct 12, 2020
Kelen Meyer; PK	Recruit ratings: Rivals: 247Sports: ESPN:				
Evan Meyersick; TE	Omaha, NE	Millard West	6 ft 5 in (1.96 m)	185 lb (84 kg)	Nov 5, 2020
Evan Meyersick; TE	Recruit ratings: Rivals: 247Sports: ESPN:				
Weston Reiman; OL	Weeping Water, NE	Weeping Water	6 ft 2 in (1.88 m)	290 lb (130 kg)	Nov 1, 2020
Weston Reiman; OL	Recruit ratings: Rivals: 247Sports: ESPN:				
Beau Schaller; OL	Waukee, IA	Waukee	6 ft 2 in (1.88 m)	265 lb (120 kg)	Dec 11, 2020
Beau Schaller; OL	Recruit ratings: Rivals: 247Sports: ESPN:				
Matthew Schuster; RB	Cozad, NE	Cozad / Ashland-Greenwood	5 ft 9 in (1.75 m)	170 lb (77 kg)	Sep 29, 2020
Matthew Schuster; RB	Recruit ratings: Rivals: 247Sports: ESPN:				
Jarrett Synek; QB	Hastings, NE	Hastings	6 ft 0 in (1.83 m)	190 lb (86 kg)	Nov 18, 2020
Jarrett Synek; QB	Recruit ratings: Rivals: 247Sports: ESPN:				
Taveon Thompson; WR/LB	Lincoln, NE	Lincoln Southeast	6 ft 4 in (1.93 m)	200 lb (91 kg)	Jan 21, 2021
Taveon Thompson; WR/LB	Recruit ratings: Rivals: 247Sports: ESPN:				
Payton Weehler; DB	Blockton, IA	Mount Ayr	6 ft 3 in (1.91 m)	190 lb (86 kg)	Nov 20, 2020
Payton Weehler; DB	Recruit ratings: Rivals: 247Sports: ESPN:				
Aiden Young; RB	Omaha, NE	Elkhorn	5 ft 9 in (1.75 m)	175 lb (79 kg)	Nov 15, 2020
Aiden Young; RB	Recruit ratings: Rivals: 247Sports: ESPN:				
Overall recruit ranking:
Note: In many cases, Scout, Rivals, 247Sports, On3, and ESPN may conflict in their listings of height and weight.; In these cases, the average was taken. ESPN grades are on a 100-point scale.; Sources: "2021 Team Ranking". Rivals.com.

== Preseason ==
=== Award watch lists ===
Award	Player	Position	Year
Johnny Unitas Award	Adrian Martinez	QB	JR
Groza Award	Connor Culp	K	SR
Mackey Award	Austin Allen	TE	JR
Maxwell Award	Adrian Martinez	QB	JR
Nagurski Trophy	JoJo Domann	LB	SR
Rimington Trophy	Cam Jurgens	C	JR

=== Preseason Big Ten Media poll and awards ===
Below are the results of the preseason Big Ten media poll with total points received next to each school and first-place votes in parentheses. For the 2021 poll, Ohio State was voted as the favorite to win both the East Division and the Big Ten Championship Game. This is the 11th iteration of the preseason media poll conducted by Cleveland.com, which polls at least one credentialed media member for each Big Ten team. Only three times in the last 11 years has the media accurately predicted the Big Ten champion.

East
Predicted finish	Team	Votes (1st place)
1	Ohio State	238 (34)
2	Penn State	192
3	Indiana	169
4	Michigan	144
5	Maryland	79
6	Rutgers	77.5
7	Michigan State	52.5

West
Predicted finish	Team	Votes (1st place)
1	Wisconsin	233 (29)
2	Iowa	202 (5)
3	Northwestern	160
4	Minnesota	146
5	Nebraska	91.5
6	Purdue	72.5
7	Illinois	47

Media poll (Big Ten Championship)
Rank	Team	Votes
1	Ohio State over Wisconsin	28
2	Ohio State over Iowa	5
3	Wisconsin over Ohio State	1

Below are the results of the annual Preseason Big Ten Player of the Year awards conducted by Cleveland.com.

Preseason Offensive Player of the Year
Rank	Player	Position	Team	Votes (1st place)
1	Chris Olave	WR	Ohio State	58 (11)
2	Michael Penix Jr.	QB	Indiana	44.5 (8)
3	Mohamed Ibrahim	RB	Minnesota	36 (4)
4	Tyler Linderbaum	C	Iowa	13 (1)
5	Garrett Wilson	WR	Ohio State	12 (1)
6	David Bell	WR	Purdue	10 (1)
7	C. J. Stroud	QB	Ohio State	6 (2)
7	Jahan Dotson	WR	Penn State	6 (1)
7	Graham Mertz	QB	Wisconsin	6 (1)
10	Tyler Goodson	RB	Iowa	5 (1)
11	Ty Fryfogle	WR	Indiana	4 (1)
12	Tanner Morgan	QB	Minnesota	3.5 (1)

Preseason Defensive Player of the Year
Rank	Player	Position	Team	Votes (1st place)
1	Brandon Joseph	S	Northwestern	49 (11)
2	George Karlaftis	DE	Purdue	33 (8)
3	Haskell Garrett	DT	Ohio State	30.5 (5)
4	Micah McFadden	LB	Indiana	28 (6)
5	Olakunle Fatukasi	LB	Rutgers	18 (3)
6	Aidan Hutchinson	DE	Michigan	11
7	Jack Sanborn	LB	Wisconsin	7
7	Tiawan Mullen	CB	Indiana	7 (1)
9	Zach Harrison	DE	Ohio State	3.5
10	Jaquan Brisker	S	Penn State	3
10	Sevyn Banks	CB	Ohio State	3
12	Boye Mafe	DE	Minnesota	2
12	Chris Bergin	LB	Northwestern	2
12	Cam Taylor-Britt	CB	Nebraska	2
12	Jake Hansen	LB	Illinois	2
16	JoJo Domann	S/LB	Nebraska	1
16	Tyshon Fogg	LB	Rutgers	1
16	Owen Carney	LB	Illinois	1

== Schedule ==
Date	Time	Opponent	Site	TV	Result	Attendance
August 28	12:00 p.m.	at Illinois	Memorial Stadium (Note: Nebraska and Illinois were originally scheduled to play at Aviva Stadium in Dublin, Ireland for the Aer Lingus College Football Classic. The game was moved back to the United States due to travel concerns during the COVID-19 pandemic.); Champaign, IL	FOX	L 22–30	41,064
September 4	11:00 a.m.	Fordham*	Memorial Stadium; Lincoln, NE	BTN	W 52–7	85,938
September 11	2:30 p.m.	Buffalo*	Memorial Stadium; Lincoln, NE	BTN	W 28–3	85,663
September 18	11:00 a.m.	at No. 3 Oklahoma*	Gaylord Family Oklahoma Memorial Stadium; Norman, OK (rivalry/Big Noon Kickoff)	FOX	L 16–23	84,659
September 25	6:00 p.m.	at No. 20 Michigan State	Spartan Stadium; East Lansing, MI	FS1	L 20–23 ^{OT}	70,332
October 2	6:30 p.m.	Northwestern^{†}	Memorial Stadium; Lincoln, NE	BTN	W 56–7	87,364
October 9	6:30 p.m.	No. 9 Michigan	Memorial Stadium; Lincoln, NE	ABC	L 29–32	87,380
October 16	11:00 a.m.	at Minnesota	Huntington Bank Stadium; Minneapolis, MN ($5 Bits of Broken Chair Trophy)	ESPN2	L 23–30	45,436
October 30	2:30 p.m.	Purdue	Memorial Stadium; Lincoln, NE	ESPN2	L 23–28	85,902
November 6	11:00 a.m.	No. 5 Ohio State	Memorial Stadium; Lincoln, NE	FOX	L 17–26	84,426
November 20	2:30 p.m.	at No. 15 Wisconsin	Camp Randall Stadium; Madison, WI (Freedom Trophy)	ABC	L 28–35	67,888
November 26	12:30 p.m.	No. 16 Iowa	Memorial Stadium; Lincoln, NE (Heroes Game)	BTN	L 21–28	86,541
*Non-conference game; ^{†}Homecoming; Rankings from AP Poll (and CFP Rankings, after November 2) – Released prior to game; All times are in Central time

The Big Ten released a revised conference schedule on February 5, 2021 to correct home/away matchups that were altered from the 2020 COVID-stricken season.

== Personnel ==
=== Roster ===
2021 Nebraska Cornhuskers football team roster
Players
Coaches
Offense

Pos.	#	Name	Class
RB	0	Jaquez Yant	RFr
QB	2	Adrian Martinez (C)	Sr
WR	3	Samori Toure	Sr
WR	4	Alante Brown	RFr
WR	5	Omar Manning	Sr
WR	7	Latrell Neville	Fr
QB	8	Logan Smothers	RFr
QB	9	Spencer Arceneaux	Fr
QB	10	Heinrich Haarberg	Fr
TE	11	Austin Allen (C)	Sr
WR	12	Will Nixon	RFr
WR	13	Kamonte Grimes	Fr
RB	14	Rahmir Johnson	So
WR	15	Zavier Betts	RFr
QB	16	Jarrett Synek	Fr
RB	16	Zach Weinmaster	So
WR	17	Ty Hahn	RFr
QB	18	Matt Masker	Jr
WR	19	Barron Miles Jr.	RFr
RB	21	Marvin Scott III	RFr
RB	22	Gabe Ervin Jr. (injured)	Fr
TE	24	Thomas Fidone II	Fr
RB	28	Sevion Morrison	RFr
RB	29	Cooper Jewett	So
RB	30	Markese Stepp	Jr
WR	32	Brody Belt	Jr
RB	34	Beau Psencik	RFr
RB	35	Trevin Luben	RFr
WR	36	Taveon Thompson	Fr
RB	37	Isaiah Harris	RFr
RB	39	Matthew Schuster	Fr
WR	41	Elliott Brown	RFr
RB	44	Aiden Young	Fr
WR	45	Truitt Robinson	Fr
TE	46	John Goodwin	So
TE	48	Evan Meyersick	Fr
TE	49	Nate Boerkircher	RFr
OL	50	Sam Hoskinson	Fr
OL	51	Cam Jurgens	Jr
OL	53	Riley Moses	So
OL	54	Bryce Benhart	So
OL	57	Ethan Piper	So
OL	58	Ian Boerkircher	Jr
OL	59	Henry Lutovsky	Fr
OL	63	Nouredin Nouili	So
OL	65	Teddy Prochazka (injured)	Fr
OL	66	Ezra Miller	So
OL	67	Joey Mancino	Fr
OL	69	Turner Corcoran	RFr
OL	70	Matt Sichterman	Sr
OL	71	Keegan Menning	RFr
OL	73	Broc Bando	Sr
OL	74	Brant Banks	So
OL	75	Trent Hixson	Sr
OL	76	Beau Schaller	Fr
OL	77	Michael Lynn	So
OL	79	Alex Conn	RFr
WR	80	Shawn Hardy II	Fr
TE	80	Jacob Herbek	So
TE	81	James Carnie	Fr
TE/WR	82	Chancellor Brewington	Jr
TE	83	Travis Vokolek	Sr
WR	84	Alex Bullock	Fr
WR	85	Wyatt Liewer	Jr
TE	86	A. J. Rollins	Fr
TE	87	Chris Hickman	So
WR	88	Levi Falck	GS
WR	89	Oliver Martin	Sr

Defense

Pos.	#	Name	Class
OLB	0	Pheldarius Payne	Jr
CB	1	Tyreke Johnson	Jr
OLB	2	Caleb Tannor	Jr
ILB	3	Will Honas (injured)	GS
S	4	Myles Farmer	So
CB	5	Cam Taylor-Britt (C)	Sr
CB	6	Quinton Newsome	So
CB	7	Tamon Lynum	RFr
S	8	Deontai Williams	GS
S	9	Marquel Dismuke	GS
ILB	10	Jackson Hannah	So
CB	11	Braxton Clark	Jr
DB	12	Marques Buford Jr.	Fr
OLB	13	JoJo Domann	GS
ILB	14	Mikai Gbayor	Fr
DB	15	Malik Williams	Fr
CB	16	Nadab Joseph	Jr
OLB	17	Jimari Butler	RFr
ILB	18	Wynden Ho'ohuli	Fr
ILB	19	Seth Malcom	Fr
S	21	Noa Pola-Gates	So
ILB	22	Eteva Mauga-Clements	Jr
S	23	Isaac Gifford	RFr
OLB	24	Blaise Gunnerson	RFr
DB	26	Koby Bretz	Fr
DB	27	Kyan Brumfield	Sr
ILB	28	Luke Reimer	So
DB	29	Ashton Hausmann	RFr
ILB	30	Randolph Kpai	Fr
ILB	31	Chris Kolarevic	Jr
DB	32	Kaden Williams	Fr
S	33	Javin Wright (injured)	So
OLB	34	Simon Otte	Jr
DB	35	Derek Branch	Fr
OLB	35	John Bullock	So
DB	36	Blake Closman	Fr
CB	37	Phalen Sanford	So
OLB	38	Damian Jackson	Sr
ILB	39	Garrett Hustedt	So
DB	40	Darius Moore	Jr
DB	41	Christian Lilienkamp	Fr
ILB	41	Garrett Snodgrass	So
DB	42	A. J. Collins	Fr
ILB	42	Nick Henrich	So
DB	43	Michael Booker III	Fr
S	43	Mason Nieman	RFr
OLB	44	Garrett Nelson	So
LB	46	Grant Buda	Fr
S	48	Lane McCallum	Sr
DL	50	Jailen Weaver	Fr
ILB	51	Braden Klover	RFr
DL	52	Mosai Newsom	So
ILB	53	Jake Archer	Jr
OLB	54	Ryan Schommer	Jr
DL	55	Chris Walker	Sr
ILB	56	Grant Tagge	RFr
ILB	58	Chris Cassidy	Jr
DL	63	Ru'Quan Buckley	Fr
DL	71	Maddox Burton	Fr
DL	72	Nash Hutmacher	RFr
OLB	81	Nick Leader	So
DL	82	Colton Feist	Jr
OLB	83	Sam Shurtleff	So
DL	93	Damion Daniels (C)	Sr
DL	91	Jordon Riley	Sr
DL	92	Tate Wildeman	Jr
DL	95	Ben Stille	GS
DL	96	Marquis Black	RFr
DL	97	Deontre Thomas	Sr
DL	98	Casey Rogers	Jr
DL	99	Ty Robinson	So

Special teams

Pos.	#	Name	Class
PK	25	Kelen Meyer	Fr
PK	33	Connor Culp	Sr
PK	36	Chase Contreraz	So
P	40	Daniel Cerni	Fr
P	90	William Przystup	So
LS	91	Cameron Pieper	So
PK	92	Brendan Franke	Fr
PK	93	Gabe Heins	RFr
LS	94	Cade Mueller	So
P	95	Grant Detlefsen	RFr
LS	96	Camden Witucki	Fr
PK	97	Josh Jasek	Fr

Head coach

- Scott Frost

Coordinators/assistant coaches

- Erik Chinander – Defensive coordinator
- Matt Lubick – Offensive coordinator/wide receivers
- Greg Austin– Offensive linemen
- Sean Beckton – Tight ends
- Mike Dawson – Outside linebackers/edge
- Travis Fisher – Defensive backs
- Ryan Held – Running backs
- Barrett Ruud – Inside linebackers
- Tony Tuioti – Defensive linemen
- Mario Verduzco – Quarterbacks
- Steve Cooper – Offensive quality control/Interim Quarterbacks
- Bill Busch – Defensive analyst

Legend

- (C) Team captain
- (S) Suspended
- (I) Ineligible
- Injured
- Redshirt

Roster
Last update: October 27, 2021

- Due to COVID-19, the NCAA granted an extra year of eligibility to student-athletes who competed during the 2020–21 season where it would not count against a student's years of eligibility. As a result, all returning players are listed as the same class as 2020.

=== Depth chart ===
Defense

FS
Marquel Dismuke
Myles Farmer
⋅

NICKEL	LB	LB
JoJo Domann	Nick Henrich	Luke Reimer
Isaac Gifford	Chris Kolarevic	Garrett Snodgrass
⋅	⋅	⋅

SS
Deontai Williams
Noa Pola-Gates
⋅

CB
Cam Taylor-Britt
Tyreke Johnson
Marques Buford

DE	DT	DT	DE
Garrett Nelson	Damion Daniels	Ben Stille	Caleb Tannor
Damian Jackson	Ty Robinson	Deontre Thomas	Pheldarius Payne
⋅	⋅	⋅	⋅

CB
Quinton Newsome
Braxton Clark
⋅

Offense

WR
Omar Manning
Levi Falck
Wyatt Liewer

WR
Samori Toure
Alante Brown
⋅

LT	LG	C	RG	RT
Turner Corcoran	Nouredin Nouili	Cam Jurgens	Matt Sichterman	Bryce Benhart
Teddy Prochazka; Brant Banks	Ethan Piper	Trent Hixson	Broc Bando	Ian Boerkircher
⋅	⋅	⋅	⋅	⋅

TE
Austin Allen
Travis Vokolek
Chancellor Brewington
Chris Hickman

WR
Zavier Betts
Oliver Martin
⋅

QB
Adrian Martinez
Logan Smothers
⋅

Key reserves
Season-ending injury Number of games played ()
RB Gabe Ervin (4)
OT Teddy Prochazka (5)
ILB Will Honas (0)
NB Javin Wright (0)

Special teams
PK Connor Culp
P William Przystup
KR Zavier Betts
PR Oilver Martin
LS Cade Mueller

RB
Rahmir Johnson
Jaquez Yant
Markese Stepp
Sevion Morrison

== Game summaries ==
=== at Illinois ===
Nebraska Cornhuskers (0–0) at Illinois Fighting Illini (0–0) – Game summary

Quarter	1	2	3	4	Total
Cornhuskers	0	9	7	6	22
Fighting Illini	2	14	14	0	30

at Memorial Stadium • Champaign, IL

- Date: August 28, 2021
- Game time: 12:20 p.m.
- Game weather: Sunny, 94 °F (34 °C)
- Game attendance: 41,064
- Referee: John O'Neill
- TV announcers (FOX): Joe Davis (play-by-play), Brock Huard (analyst)
- Sources: huskers.com

Game information

First quarter

- (4:07) ILL – Team safety (Drive: 6 plays, 3 yards, 3:24; Illinois 2–0)

Second quarter

- (14:25) NEB – Markese Stepp 2-yard run (Drive: 7 plays, 63 yards, 2:27; Nebraska 6–2)
- (9:15) NEB – Connor Culp 27-yard field goal (Drive: 8 plays, 60 yards, 3:01; Nebraska 9–2)
- (2:51) ILL – Mike Epstein 1-yard run, James McCourt kick (Drive: 11 plays, 75 yards, 6:24; Illinois 9–9)
- (0:37) ILL – Calvin Hart Jr. 41-yard fumble return, James McCourt kick (Drive: 3 plays, 2 yards, 0:21; Illinois 16–9)

Third quarter

- (6:56) ILL – Luke Ford 2-yard pass from Artur Sitkowski, James McCourt kick (Drive: 14 plays, 75 yards, 8:04; Illinois 23–9)
- (4:01) ILL – Isaiah Williams 1-yard pass from Artur Sitkowski, James McCourt kick (Drive: 3 plays, 47 yards, 1:10; Illinois 30–9)
- (3:48) NEB – Adrian Martinez 75-yard run, Connor Culp kick (Drive: 1 play, 75 yards, 0:13; Illinois 30–16)

Fourth quarter

- (2:41) NEB – Oliver Martin 4-yard pass from Adrian Martinez (Drive: 19 plays, 91 yards, 6:42; Illinois 30–22)

Statistics	NEB	ILL
First downs	19	18
Total yards	392	326
Rushes/yards	39–160	48–167
Passing yards	232	159
Passing: Comp–Att–Int	16–32–0	15–19–0
Time of possession	25:05	34:55

Team	Category	Player	Statistics
Nebraska	Passing	Adrian Martinez	16/32, 232 yards, 1 TD
Nebraska	Rushing	Adrian Martinez	17 carries, 111 yards, 1 TD
Nebraska	Receiving	Oliver Martin	6 receptions, 103 yards, 1 TD
Illinois	Passing	Artur Sitkowski	12/15, 124 yards, 2 TD
Illinois	Rushing	Mike Epstein	16 carries, 75 yards, TD
Illinois	Receiving	Deuce Spann	1 reception, 45 yards

=== vs Fordham ===
Fordham Rams (0–0) vs Nebraska Cornhuskers (0–1) – Game summary

Quarter	1	2	3	4	Total
Rams	0	7	0	0	7
Cornhuskers	7	17	14	14	52

at Memorial Stadium • Lincoln, NE

- Date: September 4, 2021
- Game time: 11:00 a.m.
- Game weather: Cloudy, 68 °F (20 °C)
- Game attendance: 85,938
- Referee: Bryan Banks
- TV announcers (BTN): Mark Followill (play-by-play), Matt Millen (analyst), Elise Menaker (sideline)
- Sources: huskers.com

Game information

First quarter

- (3:59) NEB – Adrian Martinez 4-yard run, Connor Culp kick (Drive: 13 plays, 75 yards, 4:41; Nebraska 7–0)

Second quarter

- (14:14) FORD – Fotis Kokosioulis 31-yard pass from Tim DeMorat, Nick Leinenweber kick (Drive: 7 plays, 75 yards, 2:19; Tied 7–7)
- (11:36) NEB – Connor Culp 39-yard field goal (Drive: 7 plays, 58 yards, 2:33; Nebraska 10–7)
- (3:56) NEB – Adrian Martinez 4-yard run, Connor Culp kick (Drive: 8 plays, 69 yards, 3:44; Nebraska 17–7)
- (0:29) NEB – Sevion Morrison 1-yard run, Connor Culp kick (Drive: 9 plays, 83 yards, 1:58; Nebraska 24–7)

Third quarter

- (8:24) NEB – Chancellor Brewington 2-yard pass from Adrian Martinez, Connor Culp kick (Drive: 9 plays, 64 yards, 3:40; Nebraska 31–7)
- (3:58) NEB – Samori Toure 8-yard run, Connor Culp kick (Drive: 10 plays, 35 yards, 2:53; Nebraska 38–7)

Fourth quarter

- (14:26) NEB – Sevion Morrison 6-yard run, Connor Culp kick (Drive: 10 plays, 58 yards, 3:41; Nebraska 45–7)
- (1:43) NEB – Marvin Scott III 6-yard run, Connor Culp kick (Drive: 15 plays, 62 yards, 7:13; Nebraska 52–7)

Statistics	FORD	NEB
First downs	12	34
Total yards	292	633
Rushes/yards	28–129	65–329
Passing yards	163	304
Passing: Comp–Att–Int	18–30–3	21–30–0
Time of possession	23:39	35:21

Team	Category	Player	Statistics
Fordham	Passing	Tim DeMorat	17/29, 165 yards, TD, 3 INT
Fordham	Rushing	Trey Wilson III	13 carries, 75 yards
Fordham	Receiving	DeQuece Carter	5 receptions, 69 yards
Nebraska	Passing	Adrian Martinez	17/23, 254 yards, 1 TD
Nebraska	Rushing	Markese Stepp	18 carries, 101 yards
Nebraska	Receiving	Samori Toure	8 receptions, 133 yards

=== vs Buffalo ===
Buffalo Bulls (1–0) vs Nebraska Cornhuskers (1–1) – Game summary

Quarter	1	2	3	4	Total
Bulls	0	0	3	0	3
Cornhuskers	0	14	0	14	28

at Memorial Stadium • Lincoln, NE

- Date: September 11, 2021
- Game time: 2:30 p.m.
- Game weather: Sunny, 91 °F (33 °C)
- Game attendance: 85,663
- Referee: Greg Blum
- TV announcers (BTN): Brandon Gaudin (play-by-play), Damon Benning (analyst), Rick Pizzo (sideline)
- Sources: huskers.com

Game information

First quarter

None

Second quarter

- (6:56) NEB – Gabe Ervin Jr. 2-yard run, Connor Culp kick (Drive: 4 plays, 80 yards, 1:44; Nebraska 7–0)
- (0:34) NEB – Samori Toure 68-yard pass from Adrian Martinez, Connor Culp kick (Drive: 4 plays, 80 yards, 0:58; Nebraska 14–0)

Third quarter

- (9:17) BUFF – Alex McNulty 45-yard field goal (Drive: 8 plays, 49 yards, 3:08; Nebraska 14–3)

Fourth quarter

- (14:47) NEB – Gabe Ervin Jr. 1-yard run, Connor Culp kick (Drive: 1 play, 1 yard, 0:04; Nebraska 21–3)
- (5:53) NEB – Samori Toure 68-yard pass from Adrian Martinez, Connor Culp kick (Drive: 1 play, 68 yards, 0:10; Nebraska 28–3)

Statistics	BUFF	NEB
First downs	19	19
Total yards	359	516
Rushes/yards	33–135	41–220
Passing yards	224	296
Passing: Comp–Att–Int	27–50–1	14–20–0
Time of possession	32:00	28:00

Team	Category	Player	Statistics
Buffalo	Passing	Kyle Vantrease	27/50, 224 yards, INT
Buffalo	Rushing	Kevin Marks Jr.	21 carries, 85 yards
Buffalo	Receiving	Quian Williams	8 receptions, 93 yards
Nebraska	Passing	Adrian Martinez	13/19, 242 yards, 2 TD
Nebraska	Rushing	Adrian Martinez	9 carries, 112 yards
Nebraska	Receiving	Samori Toure	2 receptions, 136 yards, 2 TD

=== at No. 3 Oklahoma ===
Nebraska Cornhuskers (2–1) at No. 3 Oklahoma Sooners (2–0) – Game summary

Quarter	1	2	3	4	Total
Cornhuskers	3	0	6	7	16
No. 3 Sooners	7	0	9	7	23

at Gaylord Family Oklahoma Memorial Stadium • Norman, OK

- Date: September 18, 2021
- Game time: 11:00 a.m.
- Game weather: Sunny, 84 °F (29 °C)
- Game attendance: 84,659
- Referee: Reggie Smith
- TV announcers (FOX): Gus Johnson (play-by-play), Joel Klatt (analyst), Jenny Taft (sideline)
- Sources: huskers.com

Game information

First quarter

- (8:02) OKLA – Spencer Rattler 1-yard run, Gabe Brkic kick (Drive: 14 plays, 75 yards, 6:58; Oklahoma 7–0)
- (1:21) NEB – Connor Culp 51-yard field goal (Drive: 14 plays, 42 yards, 6:41; Oklahoma 7–3)

Second quarter

None

Third quarter

- (3:50) OKLA – Jeremiah Hall 1-yard pass from Spencer Rattler, Gabe Brkic kick (Drive: 10 plays, 80 yards, 5:29; Oklahoma 14–3)
- (0:08) NEB – Adrian Martinez 4-yard run (Drive: 9 plays, 75 yards, 3:42; Oklahoma 14–9)
- (0:08) OKLA – Pat Fields defensive PAT conversion (Drive: 9 plays, 75 yards, 3:42; Oklahoma 16–9)

Fourth quarter

- (10:24) OKLA – Kennedy Brooks 2-yard run, Gabe Brkic kick (Drive: 12 plays, 65 yards, 4:44; Oklahoma 23–9)
- (5:38) NEB – Omar Manning 21-yard pass from Adrian Martinez, Connor Culp kick (Drive: 3 plays, 38 yards, 1:02; Oklahoma 23–16)

Statistics	NEB	OKLA
First downs	18	21
Total yards	384	408
Rushes/yards	38–95	35–194
Passing yards	289	214
Passing: Comp–Att–Int	19–25–1	24–34–0
Time of possession	29:10	30:50

Team	Category	Player	Statistics
Nebraska	Passing	Adrian Martinez	19/25, 289 yards, 1 TD, 1 INT
Nebraska	Rushing	Rahmir Johnson	11 carries, 42 yards
Nebraska	Receiving	Zavier Betts	6 receptions, 31 yards
Oklahoma	Passing	Spencer Rattler	24/34, 214 yards, TD
Oklahoma	Rushing	Eric Gray	15 carries, 84 yards
Oklahoma	Receiving	Jadon Haselwood	6 receptions, 61 yards

=== at No. 20 Michigan State ===
Nebraska Cornhuskers (2–2) at No. 20 Michigan State Spartans (3–0) – Game summary

Quarter	1	2	3	4	OT	Total
Cornhuskers	0	10	3	7	0	20
No. 20 Spartans	0	13	0	7	3	23

at Spartan Stadium • East Lansing, MI

- Date: September 25, 2021
- Game time: 7:00 p.m. EST
- Game weather: Sunny, 60 °F (16 °C)
- Game attendance: 70,332
- Referee: Jeffrey Servinski
- TV announcers (FS1): Aaron Goldsmith (play-by-play), Mark Helfrich (analyst)
- Sources: huskers.com

Game information

First quarter

None

Second quarter

- (14:08) MSU – Jayden Reed 35-yard pass from Payton Thorne, Matt Coghlin kick (Drive: 3 plays, 55 yards, 0:52; Michigan State 7–0)
- (11:22) NEB – Connor Culp 28-yard field goal (Drive: 7 plays, 65 yards, 2:46; Michigan State 7–3)
- (8:20) MSU – Matt Coghlin 26-yard field goal (Drive: 6 plays, 49 yards, 2:54; Michigan State 10–3)
- (4:20) NEB – Adrian Martinez 12-yard run, Connor Culp kick (Drive: 9 plays, 75 yards, 4:00; Tied 10–10)
- (1:03) MSU – Matt Coghlin 27-yard field goal (Drive: 9 plays, 61 yards, 3:11; Michigan State 13–10)

Third quarter

- (9:10) NEB – Connor Culp 28-yard field goal (Drive: 14 plays, 60 yards, 5:50; Tied 13–13)

Fourth quarter

- (7:29) NEB – Adrian Martinez 3-yard run, Connor Culp kick (Drive: 11 plays, 80 yards, 5:05; Nebraska 20–13)
- (3:47) MSU – Jayden Reed 62-yard punt return, Matt Coghlin kick (Drive: 3 plays, 7 yards, 2:26; Tied 20–20)

Overtime

- (0:00) MSU – Matt Coghlin 21-yard field goal (Drive: 4 plays, 22 yards, 0:00; Michigan State 23–20)

Statistics	NEB	MSU
First downs	26	12
Total yards	442	254
Rushes/yards	50–194	30–71
Passing yards	248	183
Passing: Comp–Att–Int	25–36–1	14–23–1
Time of possession	37:28	22:32

Team	Category	Player	Statistics
Nebraska	Passing	Adrian Martinez	24/34, 244 yards, INT
Nebraska	Rushing	Rahmir Johnson	19 carries, 76 yards
Nebraska	Receiving	Zavier Betts	5 receptions, 62 yards
Michigan State	Passing	Payton Thorne	14/23, 183 yards, TD, INT
Michigan State	Rushing	Kenneth Walker III	19 carries, 61 yards
Michigan State	Receiving	Tre Mosley	6 receptions, 70 yards

=== vs Northwestern ===
Northwestern Wildcats (2–2) vs Nebraska Cornhuskers (2–3) – Game summary

Quarter	1	2	3	4	Total
Wildcats	7	0	0	0	7
Cornhuskers	21	14	14	7	56

at Memorial Stadium • Lincoln, NE

- Date: October 2, 2021
- Game time: 6:30 p.m.
- Game weather: Cloudy, 67 °F (19 °C)
- Game attendance: 87,364
- Referee: Larry Smith
- TV announcers (BTN): Cory Provus (play-by-play), Matt Millen (analyst), Elise Menaker (sideline)
- Sources: huskers.com

Game information

First quarter

- (14:10) NEB – Adrian Martinez 1-yard run, Connor Culp kick (Drive: 3 plays, 75 yards, 0:50; Nebraska 7–0)
- (9:19) NEB – Adrian Martinez 1-yard run, Connor Culp kick (Drive: 6 plays, 78 yards, 2:13; Nebraska 14–0)
- (4:14) NEB – Adrian Martinez 25-yard run, Connor Culp kick (Drive: 11 plays, 64 yards, 3:31; Nebraska 21–0)
- (1:37) NW – Stephon Robinson Jr. 28-yard pass from Ryan Hilinski, Charlie Kuhbander kick (Drive: 7 plays, 82 yards, 2:31; Nebraska 21–7)

Second quarter

- (12:37) NEB – Rahmir Johnson 5-yard run, Connor Culp kick (Drive: 10 plays, 75 yards, 4:00; Nebraska 28–7)
- (0:42) NEB – Rahmir Johnson 9-yard run, Connor Culp kick (Drive: 5 plays, 59 yards, 1:10; Nebraska 35–7)

Third quarter

- (13:48) NEB – Zavier Betts 83-yard run, Connor Culp kick (Drive: 1 play, 83 yards, 0:13; Nebraska 42–7)
- (9:16) NEB – Samori Toure 58-yard pass from Adrian Martinez, Connor Culp kick (Drive: 2 plays, 57 yards, 0:41; Nebraska 49–7)

Fourth quarter

- (9:44) NEB – Sevion Morrison 4-yard run, Connor Culp kick (Drive: 13 plays, 64 yards, 8:03; Nebraska 56–7)

Statistics	NW	NEB
First downs	17	28
Total yards	293	657
Rushes/yards	26–37	53–427
Passing yards	256	230
Passing: Comp–Att–Int	25–40–0	15–21–0
Time of possession	25:55	34:05

Team	Category	Player	Statistics
Northwestern	Passing	Ryan Hilinski	29/35, 256 yards, TD
Northwestern	Rushing	Evan Hull	7 carries, 31 yards
Northwestern	Receiving	Stephon Robinson Jr.	8 receptions, 116 yards, TD
Nebraska	Passing	Adrian Martinez	11/17, 202 yards, 1 TD
Nebraska	Rushing	Jaquez Yant	13 carries, 127 yards
Nebraska	Receiving	Samori Toure	2 receptions, 108 yards, 1 TD

=== vs No. 9 Michigan ===
No. 9 Michigan Wolverines (5–0) vs Nebraska Cornhuskers (3–3) – Game summary

Quarter	1	2	3	4	Total
No. 9 Wolverines	0	13	6	13	32
Cornhuskers	0	0	22	7	29

at Memorial Stadium • Lincoln, NE

- Date: October 9, 2021
- Game time: 6:00 p.m.
- Game weather: Sunny, 94 °F (34 °C)
- Game attendance: 87,380
- Referee: Reggie Smith
- TV announcers (ABC): Sean McDonough (play-by-play), Todd Blackledge (analyst), Molly McGrath (sideline)
- Sources: huskers.com

Game information

First quarter

None

Second quarter

- (9:52) MICH – Jake Moody 35-yard field goal (Drive: 6 plays, 18 yards, 2:55; Michigan 3–0)
- (3:19) MICH – Jake Moody 21-yard field goal (Drive: 11 plays, 87 yards, 5:18; Michigan 6–0)
- (0:09) MICH – Hassan Haskins 3-yard run, Jake Moody kick (Drive: 11 plays, 76 yards, 1:28; Michigan 13–0)

Third quarter

- (12:49) NEB – Austin Allen 46-yard pass from Adrian Martinez, Connor Culp kick (Drive: 6 plays, 75 yards, 2:11; Michigan 13–7)
- (3:36) MICH – Hassan Haskins 3-yard run (Drive: 10 plays, 91 yards, 4:31; Michigan 19–7)
- (1:24) NEB – Rahmir Johnson 41-yard pass from Adrian Martinez, Connor Culp kick (Drive: 5 plays, 75 yards, 2:12; Michigan 19–14)
- (0:52) NEB – Levi Falck 13-yard pass from Adrian Martinez, Adrian Martinez two-point run (Drive: 1 play, 13 yards, 0:07; Nebraska 22–19)

Fourth quarter

- (11:21) MICH – Blake Corum 29-yard run, Jake Moody kick (Drive: 10 plays, 75 yards, 4:31; Michigan 26–22)
- (7:08) NEB – Adrian Martinez 5-yard run, Connor Culp kick (Drive: 8 plays, 75 yards, 4:13; Nebraska 29–26)
- (3:00) MICH – Jake Moody 31-yard field goal (Drive: 9 plays, 69 yards, 4:08; Tied 29–29)
- (1:24) MICH – Jake Moody 39-yard field goal (Drive: 4 plays, −3 yards, 0:21; Michigan 32–29)

Statistics	MICH	NEB
First downs	26	19
Total yards	459	431
Rushes/yards	42–204	32–140
Passing yards	255	291
Passing: Comp–Att–Int	22–39–1	18–28–1
Time of possession	34:24	25:36

Team	Category	Player	Statistics
Michigan	Passing	Cade McNamara	22/38, 255 yards, 3 TD
Michigan	Rushing	Hassan Haskins	21 carries, 123 yards, 2 TD
Michigan	Receiving	Daylen Baldwin	6 receptions, 64 yards
Nebraska	Passing	Adrian Martinez	18/28, 291 yards, 3 TD
Nebraska	Rushing	Rahmir Johnson	17 carries, 67 yards
Nebraska	Receiving	Rahmir Johnson	6 receptions, 105 yards, 1 TD

=== at Minnesota ===
Nebraska Cornhuskers (3–4) at Minnesota Golden Gophers (3–2) – Game summary

Quarter	1	2	3	4	Total
Cornhuskers	3	6	7	7	23
Golden Gophers	7	14	0	9	30

at Huntington Bank Stadium • Minneapolis, MN

- Date: October 16, 2021
- Game time: 11:00 a.m.
- Game weather: Sunny, 51 °F (11 °C)
- Game attendance: 45,436
- Referee: Ron Snodgross
- TV announcers (ESPN2): Brian Custer (play-by-play), Kelly Stouffer (analyst), Lauren Sisler (sideline)
- Sources: huskers.com

Game information

First quarter

- (6:33) MINN – Brevyn Spann-Ford 5-yard pass from Cole Kramer, Matthew Trickett kick (Drive: 14 plays, 61 yards, 7:42; Minnesota 7–0)
- (3:59) NEB – Connor Culp 50-yard field goal (Drive: 6 plays, 43 yards, 2:34; Minnesota 7–3)

Second quarter

- (14:53) MINN – Mike Brown-Stephens 28-yard pass from Tanner Morgan, Matthew Trickett kick (Drive: 7 plays, 79 yards, 4:06; Minnesota 14–3)
- (5:47) NEB – Rahmir Johnson 6-yard run (Drive: 9 plays, 68 yards, 3:21; Minnesota 14–9)
- (1:53) MINN – Chris Autman-Bell 6-yard pass from Tanner Morgan, Matthew Trickett kick (Drive: 8 plays, 75 yards, 3:54; Minnesota 21–9)

Third quarter

- (9:29) NEB – Rahmir Johnson 1-yard run, Connor Culp kick (Drive: 3 plays, 45 yards, 0:42; Minnesota 21–16)

Fourth quarter

- (4:45) MINN – Esezi Otomewo safety (Drive: 1 play, −11 yards, 0:08; Minnesota 23–16)
- (2:12) MINN – Bryce Williams 56-yard run, Matthew Trickett kick (Drive: 5 plays, 72 yards, 2:33; Minnesota 30–16)
- (1:12) NEB – Austin Allen 9-yard from Adrian Martinez, Connor Culp kick (Drive: 6 plays, 75 yards, 1:00; Minnesota 30–23)

Statistics	NEB	MINN
First downs	19	22
Total yards	377	396
Rushes/yards	31–136	43–182
Passing yards	241	214
Passing: Comp–Att–Int	18–33–0	21–25–2
Time of possession	21:59	38:01

Team	Category	Player	Statistics
Nebraska	Passing	Adrian Martinez	18/33, 241 yards, 1 TD
Nebraska	Rushing	Rahmir Johnson	11 carries, 83 yards, 2 TD
Nebraska	Receiving	Austin Allen	5 receptions, 121 yards, 1 TD
Minnesota	Passing	Tanner Morgan	20/24, 209 yards, 2 TD, 2 INT
Minnesota	Rushing	Bryce Williams	17 carries, 127 yards, TD
Minnesota	Receiving	Chris Autman-Bell	11 receptions, 103 yards, TD

=== vs Purdue ===
Purdue Boilermakers (4–3) vs Nebraska Cornhuskers (3–5) – Game summary

Quarter	1	2	3	4	Total
Boilermakers	0	14	7	7	28
Cornhuskers	7	10	0	6	23

at Memorial Stadium • Lincoln, NE

- Date: October 30, 2021
- Game time: 2:30 p.m.
- Game weather: Sunny, 66 °F (19 °C)
- Game attendance: 85,902
- Referee: John O'Neill
- TV announcers (ESPN2): Roy Philpott (play-by-play), Kelly Stouffer (analyst), Lauren Sisler (sideline)
- Sources: huskers.com

Game information

First quarter

- (6:16) NEB – Omar Manning 16-yard pass from Adrian Martinez, Chase Contreraz kick (Drive: 12 plays, 82 yards, 4:36; Nebraska 7–0)

Second quarter

- (12:37) PUR – Jalen Graham 45-yard interception return, Mitchell Fineran kick (Drive: 5 plays, 24 yards, 2:15; Tied 7–7)
- (10:45) NEB – Adrian Martinez 4-yard run, Chase Contreraz kick (Drive: 5 plays, 75 yards, 1:52; Nebraska 14–7)
- (3:48) PUR – Zander Horvath 1-yard run, Mitchell Fineran kick (Drive: 14 plays, 75 yards, 6:57; Tied 14–14)
- (1:20) NEB – Chase Contreraz 33-yard field goal (Drive: 7 plays, 61 yards, 2:28; Nebraska 17–14)

Third quarter

- (2:47) PUR – Milton Wright 3-yard pass from Aidan O'Connell, Mitchell Fineran kick (Drive: 8 plays, 48 yards, 2:59; Purdue 21–17)

Fourth quarter

- (10:05) PUR – Jackson Anthrop 9-yard pass from Aidan O'Connell, Mitchell Fineran kick (Drive: 14 plays, 75 yards, 5:47; Purdue 28–17)
- (1:44) NEB – Rahmir Johnson 12-yard pass from Adrian Martinez (Drive: 8 plays, 94 yards, 1:30; Purdue 28–23)

Statistics	PUR	NEB
First downs	23	19
Total yards	349	399
Rushes/yards	41–116	29–130
Passing yards	233	269
Passing: Comp–Att–Int	34–45–0	14–29–4
Time of possession	38:38	21:22

Team	Category	Player	Statistics
Purdue	Passing	Aidan O'Connell	34/45, 233 yards, 2 TD
Purdue	Rushing	King Doerue	17 carries, 74 yards
Purdue	Receiving	David Bell	9 receptions, 74 yards
Nebraska	Passing	Adrian Martinez	14/29, 269 yards, 2 TD, 4 INT
Nebraska	Rushing	Jaquez Yant	6 carries, 60 yards
Nebraska	Receiving	Omar Manning	4 receptions, 75 yards, 1 TD

=== vs No. 5 Ohio State ===
No. 5 Ohio State Buckeyes (7–1) vs Nebraska Cornhuskers (3–6) – Game summary

Quarter	1	2	3	4	Total
No. 5 Buckeyes	0	17	6	3	26
Cornhuskers	0	10	7	0	17

at Memorial Stadium • Lincoln, NE

- Date: November 6, 2021
- Game time: 11:00 a.m.
- Game weather: Sunny, 50 °F (10 °C)
- Game attendance: 84,426
- Referee: Michael Cannon
- TV announcers (FOX): Gus Johnson (play-by-play), Joel Klatt (analyst), Jenny Taft (sideline)
- Sources: huskers.com

Game information

First quarter

None

Second quarter

- (11:25) OSU – Noah Ruggles 26-yard field goal (Drive: 11 plays, 57 yards, 4:52; Ohio State 3–0)
- (6:41) OSU – Chris Olave 3-yard pass from C. J. Stroud, Noah Ruggles kick (Drive: 7 plays, 49 yards, 3:24; Ohio State 10–0)
- (3:52) NEB – Chase Contreraz 39-yard field goal (Drive: 8 plays, 54 yards, 2:49; Ohio State 10–3)
- (3:34) OSU – Jaxon Smith-Njigba 75-yard pass from C. J. Stroud, Noah Ruggles kick (Drive: 1 play, 75 yards, 0:18; Ohio State 17–3)
- (2:53) NEB – Samori Toure 72-yard pass from Adrian Martinez, Chase Contreraz kick (Drive: 2 plays, 75 yards, 0:41; Ohio State 17–10)

Third quarter

- (9:42) OSU – Noah Ruggles 46-yard field goal (Drive: 5 plays, 23 yards, 2:44; Ohio State 20–10)
- (2:05) OSU – Noah Ruggles 35-yard field goal (Drive: 6 plays, 35 yards, 2:21; Ohio State 23–10)
- (0:22) NEB – Adrian Martinez 1-yard run, Chase Contreraz kick (Drive: 5 plays, 75 yards, 1:43; Ohio State 23–17)

Fourth quarter

- (1:29) OSU – Noah Ruggles 46-yard field goal (Drive: 9 plays, 58 yards, 3:41; Ohio State 26–17)

Statistics	OSU	NEB
First downs	25	18
Total yards	495	361
Rushes/yards	30–90	34–113
Passing yards	405	248
Passing: Comp–Att–Int	36–54–2	16–31–1
Time of possession	33:52	26:08

Team	Category	Player	Statistics
Ohio State	Passing	C. J. Stroud	36/54, 405 yards, 2 TD, 2 INT
Ohio State	Rushing	TreVeyon Henderson	21 carries, 92 yards
Ohio State	Receiving	Jaxon Smith-Njigba	15 receptions, 240 yards, TD
Nebraska	Passing	Adrian Martinez	16/31, 248 yards, 1 TD, 1 INT
Nebraska	Rushing	Rahmir Johnson	16 carries, 62 yards
Nebraska	Receiving	Samori Toure	4 receptions, 150 yards, 1 TD

=== at No. 15 Wisconsin ===
Nebraska Cornhuskers (3–7) vs No. 15 Wisconsin Badgers (7–3) – Game summary

Quarter	1	2	3	4	Total
Cornhuskers	7	7	7	7	28
No. 15 Badgers	14	0	14	7	35

at Camp Randall Stadium • Madison, WI

- Date: November 20, 2021
- Game time: 2:30 p.m.
- Game weather: Cloudy, 47 °F (8 °C); Wind at W 7 MPH
- Game attendance: 67,888
- Referee: Jerry McGinn
- TV announcers (ABC): Dave Pasch (play-by-play), Dusty Dvoracek (analyst), Tom Luginbill (sideline)
- Sources: huskers.com

Game information

First quarter

- (14:47) WISC – Stephan Bracey 91-yard kickoff return, Collin Larsh kick (Drive: 0 plays, 0 yards, 0:13; Wisconsin 7–0)
- (12:41) NEB – Markese Stepp 1-yard run, Chase Contreraz kick (Drive: 5 plays, 74 yards, 2:06; Tied 7–7)
- (1:59) WIC – Braelon Allen 71-yard run, Collin Larsh kick (Drive: 3 plays, 80 yards, 1:23; Wisconsin 14–7)

Second quarter

- (6:35) NEB – Samori Toure 4-yard pass from Adrian Martinez, Chase Contreraz kick (Drive: 8 plays, 48 yards, 3:02; Tied 14–14)

Third quarter

- (11:35) WISC – Kendric Pryor 17-yard pass from Graham Mertz, Collin Larsh kick (Drive: 4 plays, 33 yards, 2:01; Wisconsin 21–14)
- (6:24) NEB – Adrian Martinez 1-yard run, Chase Contreraz kick (Drive: 11 plays, 75 yards, 5:11; Tied 21–21)
- (1:30) WISC – Braelon Allen 3-yard run, Collin Larsh kick (Drive: 8 plays, 75 yards, 4:54; Wisconsin 28–28)

Fourth quarter

- (6:27) NEB – Marvin Scott III 3-yard run, Chase Contreraz kick (Drive: 7 plays, 68 yards, 3:52; Tied 28–28)
- (3:50) WISC – Braelon Allen 53-yard run, Collin Larsh kick (Drive: 5 plays, 75 yards, 2:37; Wisconsin 35–28)

Statistics	NEB	WISC
First downs	22	15
Total yards	452	397
Rushes/yards	35–101	31–252
Passing yards	351	145
Passing: Comp–Att–Int	23–35–2	12–18–0
Time of possession	33:17	26:43

Team	Category	Player	Statistics
Nebraska	Passing	Adrian Martinez	23/35, 351 yards, 1 TD, 2 INT
Nebraska	Rushing	Brody Belt	7 carries, 31 yards
Nebraska	Receiving	Austin Allen	7 receptions, 143 yards
Wisconsin	Passing	Graham Mertz	12/18, 145 yards, TD
Wisconsin	Rushing	Braelon Allen	22 carries, 228 yards, 3 TD
Wisconsin	Receiving	Jake Ferguson	8 receptions, 92 yards

=== vs No. 17 Iowa ===
No. 17 Iowa Hawkeyes (9–2) vs Nebraska Cornhuskers (3–8) – Game summary

Quarter	1	2	3	4	Total
No. 17 Hawkeyes	0	3	6	19	28
Cornhuskers	7	7	7	0	21

at Memorial Stadium • Lincoln, NE

- Date: November 26, 2021
- Game time: 12:00 p.m.
- Game weather: Sunny, 57 °F (14 °C)
- Game attendance: 86,541
- Referee: Mark Kluczynski
- TV announcers (BTN): Brandon Gaudin (play-by-play), James Laurinaitis (analyst), Rick Pizzo (sideline)
- Sources: huskers.com

Game information

First quarter

- (9:18) NEB – Logan Smothers 2-yard run, Chase Contreraz kick (Drive: 12 plays, 75 yards, 5:42; Nebraska 7–0)

Second quarter

- (10:39) IOWA – Caleb Shudak 51-yard field goal (Drive: 7 plays, 27 yards, 2:57; Nebraska 7–3)
- (4:20) NEB – Jaquez Yant 1-yard run, Chase Contreraz kick (Drive: 13 plays, 75 yards, 6:19; Nebraska 14–3)
- (0:39) IOWA – Caleb Shudak 48-yard field goal (Drive: 8 plays, 45 yards, 3:41; Nebraska 14–6)

Third quarter

- (5:54) NEB – Logan Smothers 1-yard run, Chase Contreraz kick (Drive: 9 plays, 94 yards, 4:18; Nebraska 21–6)
- (0:27) IOWA – Caleb Shudak 36-yard field goal (Drive: 10 plays, 57 yards, 5:27; Nebraska 21–9)

Fourth quarter

- (14:16) IOWA – Kyler Fisher 14-yard blocked punt return, Caleb Shudak kick (Drive: 3 plays, 2 yards, 1:11; Nebraska 21–16)
- (9:56) IOWA – Team safety (Drive: 1 play, −1 yards, 0:41; Nebraska 21–18)
- (7:21) IOWA – Caleb Shudak 44-yard field goal (Drive: 8 plays, 36 yards, 2:35; Tied 21–21)
- (2:58) IOWA – Spencer Petras 2-yard run, Caleb Shudak kick (Drive: 6 plays, 76 yards, 3:00; Iowa 28–21)

Statistics	IOWA	NEB
First downs	19	18
Total yards	364	327
Rushes/yards	37–186	43–129
Passing yards	178	198
Passing: Comp–Att–Int	13–27–0	16–22–1
Time of possession	31:53	28:07

Team	Category	Player	Statistics
Iowa	Passing	Spencer Petras	7/13, 102 yards
Iowa	Rushing	Tyler Goodson	23 carries, 156 yards
Iowa	Receiving	Sam LaPorta	3 receptions, 61 yards
Nebraska	Passing	Logan Smothers	16/22, 198 yards, INT
Nebraska	Rushing	Logan Smothers	24 carries, 64 yards, 2 TD
Nebraska	Receiving	Samori Toure	6 receptions, 67 yards

== Big Ten awards ==
=== Player of the Week Honors ===
Weekly Awards
Player	Award	Week Awarded	Ref.
Luke Reimer	Big Ten Defensive Player of the Week	Week 2	
JoJo Domann	Big Ten Co-defensive Player of the Week	Week 5	

=== All-Conference awards ===
2021 Big Ten Offense All-Conference Teams and Awards

Kwalick-Clark Tight End of the Year
Position	Player
TE	Austin Allen

Coaches All-Big Ten
Position	Player	Team
TE	Austin Allen	Second Team
LB	JoJo Domann	Second Team
DB	Cam Taylor-Britt	Second Team
C	Cam Jurgens	Third Team
DL	Damion Daniels	Honorable Mention
QB	Adrian Martinez	Honorable Mention
DL	Ben Stille	Honorable Mention
LB	Luke Reimer	Honorable Mention
DB	Marquel Dismuke	Honorable Mention
DB	Deontai Williams	Honorable Mention

Media All-Big Ten
Position	Player	Team
TE	Austin Allen	First Team
DB	Cam Taylor-Britt	Second Team
LB	JoJo Domann	Third Team
WR	Samori Toure	Honorable Mention
C	Cam Jurgens	Honorable Mention
DL	Damion Daniels	Honorable Mention
DL	Ben Stille	Honorable Mention
LB	Luke Reimer	Honorable Mention
DB	Deontai Williams	Honorable Mention

== National awards ==
=== All-America awards ===
Associated Press All-America Team
Position	Player	Team
DB	JoJo Domann	Second Team

== Players drafted into the NFL ==
Round	Pick	Player	Position	NFL Club
2	51	Cam Jurgens	C	Philadelphia Eagles
2	60	Cam Taylor-Britt	CB	Cincinnati Bengals
7	258	Samori Toure	WR	Green Bay Packers
