= 2020 Nebraska Cornhuskers football team =

American college football season

2020 Nebraska Cornhuskers football
- Conference: Big Ten Conference
- West
- Record: 3–5 (3–5 Big Ten)
- Head coach: Scott Frost (3rd season)
- Offensive coordinator: Matt Lubick (1st season)
- Defensive coordinator: Erik Chinander (3rd season)
- Home stadium: Memorial Stadium

Uniform
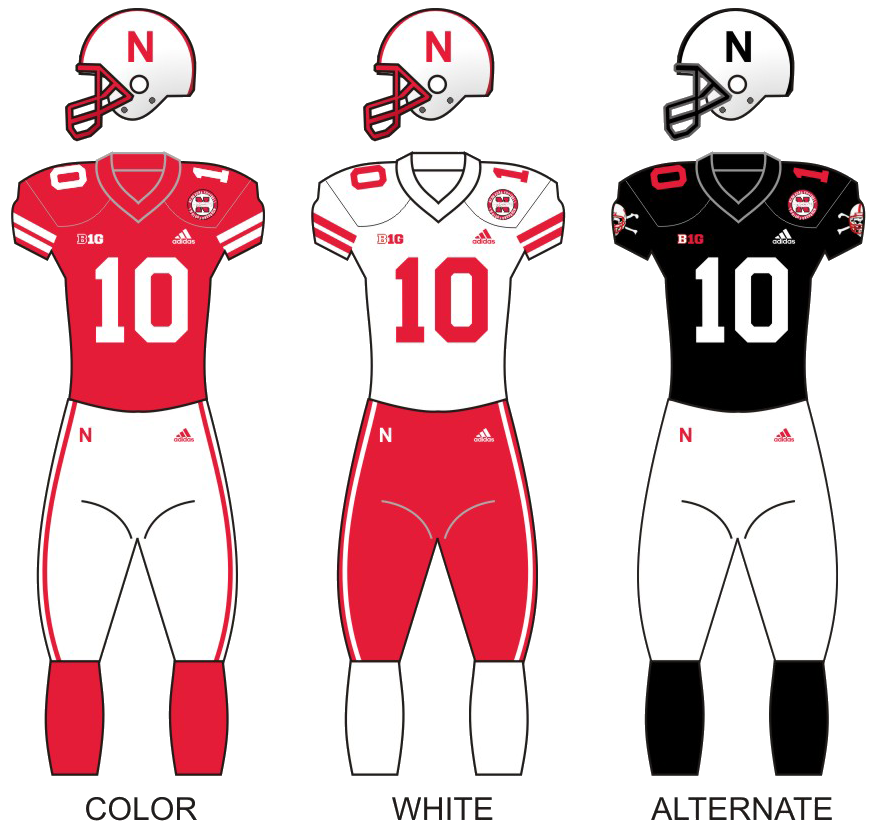

2020 Big Ten Conference football standings
	Conf.			Overall
Team	W		L	W		L
East Division
No. 2 Ohio State xy$^	5	–	0	7	–	1
No. 12 Indiana	6	–	1	6	–	2
Penn State	4	–	5	4	–	5
Maryland	2	–	3	2	–	3
Rutgers	3	–	6	3	–	6
Michigan	2	–	4	2	–	4
Michigan State	2	–	5	2	–	5
West Division
No. 10 Northwestern xy	6	–	1	7	–	2
No. 16 Iowa	6	–	2	6	–	2
Wisconsin	3	–	3	4	–	3
Minnesota	3	–	4	3	–	4
Nebraska	3	–	5	3	–	5
Purdue	2	–	4	2	–	4
Illinois	2	–	6	2	–	6
Championship: Ohio State 22, Northwestern 10
^ – College Football Playoff participant; $ – Conference champion; x – Division champion/co-champions; y – Championship game participant; Note: Due to COVID-19, the Big Ten suspended the season on August 11, but later decided to begin play on October 24. In addition to the title game that was played on December 19, the conference seeded all remaining teams for "championship week" games.; Rankings from AP Poll.

The 2020 Nebraska Cornhuskers football team represented the University of Nebraska in the 2020 NCAA Division I FBS football season. The team was coached by third-year head coach Scott Frost and played their games at Memorial Stadium in Lincoln, Nebraska, as members of the West Division in the Big Ten Conference.

On August 11, 2020, the Big Ten Conference suspended all fall sports competitions due to the COVID-19 pandemic. The team disclosed an attempt to play a fall football season as an independent, but Commissioner Kevin Warren stated they could not do so without facing consequences. In late-August, a group of Nebraska players also sued the Big Ten, alleging that its council did not actually vote on the postponement. On September 16, the Big Ten reinstated the season, announcing an eight-game season beginning on October 24.

After playing to a 3–5 record, all in conference games, the team announced on December 20 that it would not participate in any bowl game.

== Offseason ==
=== 2020 NFL draft ===
Round	Pick	Player	Team
6	194	Khalil Davis	Tampa Bay Buccaneers
7	232	Carlos Davis	Pittsburgh Steelers
Undrafted		Darrion Daniels	San Francisco 49ers
Undrafted		Lamar Jackson	New York Jets

=== Transfers ===
==== Outgoing ====
Name	Number	Position	Height	Weight	Class	Hometown	Destination
Jaylin Bradley	#33	RB	6'0"	200	Junior	Bellevue, NE	N/A
Moses Bryant	#35	CB	5'11"	200	Sophomore	Elkhorn, NE	N/A
Andrew Bunch	#17	QB	6'1"	215	Senior	Thompson's Station, TN	Southeast Missouri State
Tony Butler	#25	CB	6'2"	220	Senior	Lakewood, OH	Kent State
Darien Chase	#13	WR	6'1"	180	RS-Freshman	Vancouver, WA	Portland State
Ethan Cox	#16	CB	5'10"	195	Junior	Blair, NE	N/A
AJ Forbes	#52	OL	6'4"	310	Sophomore	Bellevue, NE	Montana
Jaiden Francois	#12	CB	6'0"	185	Freshman	Homestead, FL	Central Florida
Henry Gray	N/A	CB	6'0"	175	Freshman	Hollywood, FL	Florida International
Keyshawn Greene	#17	LB	6'3"	175	Freshman	Crawfordville, FL	Florida Atlantic
Andre Hunt	#15	WR	6'0"	190	Sophomore	Palmdale, CA	(dismissed from team)
Pernell Jefferson	#32	LB	6'2"	250	Senior	New Orleans, LA	Arkansas–Monticello
Joey Johnson	#53	LB	6'3"	240	Sophomore	Gretna, NE	N/A
Miles Jones	#22	WR	5'8"	175	Sophomore	Miramar, FL	Tennessee
Dylan Jorgensen	#97	PK	5'9"	185	Sophomore	Lincoln, NE	N/A
Katerian Legrone	#12	TE	6'3"	235	Sophomore	Atlanta, GA	(dismissed from team)
Jaevon McQuitty	#4	WR	6'0"	200	Junior	Columbia, MO	South Dakota
Jordan Paup	#57	LB	6'3"	245	Junior	Central City, NE	Abilene Christian
Barret Pickering	#32	PK	6'0"	200	Junior	Birmingham, AL	(retired)
John Raridon	#50	OL	6'4"	315	Senior	West Des Moines, IA	(retired)
JD Spielman	#10	WR	5'9"	180	Senior	Eden Prairie, MN	TCU
Isaiah Stalbird	#49	S	6'0"	210	Sophomore	Kearney, NE	South Dakota State
Noah Vedral	#16	QB	6'1"	200	Junior	Wahoo, NE	Rutgers
Matt Waldoch	#35	PK	6'0"	170	Junior	Geneva, IL	(retired)
Maurice Washington	#28	RB	6'1"	190	Junior	Stockton, CA	(dismissed from team)
Jaron Woodyard	#8	WR	5'11"	185	Senior	Gaithersburg, MD	Marshall

==== Incoming ====
Name	Number	Position	Height	Weight	Class	Hometown	Previous School
Jared Bubak	#80	TE	6'5"	240	Senior	Lincoln, NE	Arizona State
Connor Culp	N/A	PK	5'10"	185	Senior	Phoenix, AZ	LSU
Levi Falck	N/A	WR	6'2"	205	Senior	Circle Pines, MN	South Dakota
Ezra Miller	N/A	OL	6'6"	310	Sophomore	Holstein, IA	Iowa
Nouredin Nouili	#63	OL	6'4"	285	Sophomore	Frankfurt, Germany	Colorado State
Zach Schlager	#25	LB	6'0"	210	Sophomore	McCook, NE	Colorado State

=== Recruits ===
The Cornhuskers signed a total of 23 scholarship recruits and 20 walk-ons during the Early Signing Period on December 18, 2019.

==== Scholarship recruits ====
College recruiting (2020)
Name	Hometown	School	Height	Weight	Commit date
Zavier Betts; WR	Bellevue, NE	Bellevue West	6 ft 2 in (1.88 m)	200 lb (91 kg)	Apr 3, 2019
Zavier Betts; WR	Recruit ratings: Rivals: 247Sports: ESPN: (84)				
Marquis Black; DL	McDonough, GA	Eagle's Landing Christian Academy	6 ft 4 in (1.93 m)	290 lb (130 kg)	Oct 12, 2019
Marquis Black; DL	Recruit ratings: Rivals: 247Sports: ESPN: (77)				
Alante Brown; WR	Chicago, IL	St. Thomas More Prep	5 ft 11 in (1.80 m)	190 lb (86 kg)	Dec 18, 2019
Alante Brown; WR	Recruit ratings: Rivals: 247Sports: ESPN: (79)				
Jimari Butler; LB	Mobile, AL	Murphy	6 ft 5 in (1.96 m)	220 lb (100 kg)	Dec 16, 2019
Jimari Butler; LB	Recruit ratings: Rivals: 247Sports: ESPN: (77)				
Alex Conn; OL	Derby, KS	Derby	6 ft 6 in (1.98 m)	280 lb (130 kg)	Jun 24, 2019
Alex Conn; OL	Recruit ratings: Rivals: 247Sports: ESPN: (77)				
Niko Cooper; LB	Memphis, TN	Douglass / Hutchinson CC	6 ft 5 in (1.96 m)	220 lb (100 kg)	Dec 15, 2019
Niko Cooper; LB	Recruit ratings: Rivals: 247Sports: ESPN: (76)				
Turner Corcoran; OL	Lawrence, KS	Lawrence Free State	6 ft 6 in (1.98 m)	285 lb (129 kg)	Apr 13, 2019
Turner Corcoran; OL	Recruit ratings: Rivals: 247Sports: ESPN: (84)				
Ronald Delancy III; CB	Miami, FL	Miami Northwestern	5 ft 11 in (1.80 m)	160 lb (73 kg)	Oct 8, 2019
Ronald Delancy III; CB	Recruit ratings: Rivals: 247Sports: ESPN: (74)				
Marcus Fleming; WR	Miami, FL	Miami Northwestern	5 ft 10 in (1.78 m)	170 lb (77 kg)	Dec 18, 2019
Marcus Fleming; WR	Recruit ratings: Rivals: 247Sports: ESPN: (80)				
Jaiden Francois; CB	Homestead, FL	South Dade	6 ft 0 in (1.83 m)	185 lb (84 kg)	Dec 18, 2019
Jaiden Francois; CB	Recruit ratings: Rivals: 247Sports: ESPN: (81)				
Henry Gray; S	Hollywood, FL	Central	6 ft 0 in (1.83 m)	175 lb (79 kg)	Sep 19, 2019
Henry Gray; S	Recruit ratings: Rivals: 247Sports: ESPN: (82)				
Keyshawn Greene; LB	Crawfordville, FL	Wakulla	6 ft 3 in (1.91 m)	210 lb (95 kg)	Dec 15, 2019
Keyshawn Greene; LB	Recruit ratings: Rivals: 247Sports: ESPN: (82)				
Blaise Gunnerson; LB	Carroll, IA	Kuemper Catholic	6 ft 6 in (1.98 m)	250 lb (110 kg)	Jul 2, 2019
Blaise Gunnerson; LB	Recruit ratings: Rivals: 247Sports: ESPN: (76)				
Nash Hutmacher; DL	Oacoma, SD	Chamberlain	6 ft 5 in (1.96 m)	300 lb (140 kg)	Jun 29, 2019
Nash Hutmacher; DL	Recruit ratings: Rivals: 247Sports: ESPN: (79)				
Tamon Lynum; CB	Orlando, FL	Evans	6 ft 2 in (1.88 m)	170 lb (77 kg)	Jun 23, 2019
Tamon Lynum; CB	Recruit ratings: Rivals: 247Sports: ESPN: (72)				
Omar Manning; WR	Lancaster, TX	Lancaster / TCU / Kilgore College	6 ft 4 in (1.93 m)	225 lb (102 kg)	Dec 13, 2019
Omar Manning; WR	Recruit ratings: Rivals: 247Sports: ESPN: (81)				
Eteva Mauga-Clements; LB	Pleasant Hill, CA	College Park / Diablo Valley	6 ft 2 in (1.88 m)	220 lb (100 kg)	Dec 11, 2019
Eteva Mauga-Clements; LB	Recruit ratings: Rivals: 247Sports: ESPN: (75)				
Sevion Morrison; RB	Tulsa, OK	Edison	6 ft 0 in (1.83 m)	200 lb (91 kg)	Aug 21, 2019
Sevion Morrison; RB	Recruit ratings: Rivals: 247Sports: ESPN: (78)				
Will Nixon; WR	Waco, TX	Midway	5 ft 11 in (1.80 m)	185 lb (84 kg)	Jul 8, 2019
Will Nixon; WR	Recruit ratings: Rivals: 247Sports: ESPN: (77)				
Pheldarius Payne; DL	Suffolk, VA	Nansemond River / Lackawanna	6 ft 3 in (1.91 m)	275 lb (125 kg)	Dec 18, 2019
Pheldarius Payne; DL	Recruit ratings: Rivals: 247Sports: ESPN: (79)				
Jordon Riley; DL	New Bern, NC	Riverside / North Carolina / Garden City CC	6 ft 6 in (1.98 m)	290 lb (130 kg)	Dec 17, 2019
Jordon Riley; DL	Recruit ratings: Rivals: 247Sports: ESPN: (73)				
Marvin Scott III; RB	Port Orange, FL	Spruce Creek	5 ft 9 in (1.75 m)	200 lb (91 kg)	Aug 24, 2019
Marvin Scott III; RB	Recruit ratings: Rivals: 247Sports: ESPN: (77)				
Logan Smothers; QB	Muscle Shoals, AL	Muscle Shoals	6 ft 2 in (1.88 m)	190 lb (86 kg)	Jul 26, 2019
Logan Smothers; QB	Recruit ratings: Rivals: 247Sports: ESPN: (79)				
Overall recruit ranking: Rivals: 17 247Sports: 20 ESPN: 24
Note: In many cases, Scout, Rivals, 247Sports, On3, and ESPN may conflict in their listings of height and weight.; In these cases, the average was taken. ESPN grades are on a 100-point scale.; Sources: "Nebraska Football Commitments". Rivals.; "ESPN". ESPN.; "2020 Team Ranking". Rivals.com.

==== Walk-on recruits ====
College recruiting (2020)
Name	Hometown	School	Height	Weight	Commit date
Bladen Bayless; OL	Beatrice, NE	Beatrice	6 ft 3 in (1.91 m)	260 lb (120 kg)	Dec 18, 2019
Bladen Bayless; OL	Recruit ratings: Rivals: 247Sports: ESPN:				
Nate Boerkircher; TE	Aurora, NE	Aurora	6 ft 4 in (1.93 m)	215 lb (98 kg)	Dec 18, 2019
Nate Boerkircher; TE	Recruit ratings: Rivals: 247Sports: ESPN:				
Baylor Brannen; DL	Omaha, NE	Millard West	6 ft 4 in (1.93 m)	260 lb (120 kg)	Dec 18, 2019
Baylor Brannen; DL	Recruit ratings: Rivals: 247Sports: ESPN:				
Elliott Brown; WR	Omaha, NE	Elkhorn South	6 ft 1 in (1.85 m)	175 lb (79 kg)	Dec 18, 2019
Elliott Brown; WR	Recruit ratings: Rivals: 247Sports: ESPN:				
Chase Contreraz; PK	Missouri Valley, IA	Missouri Valley / Iowa Western	6 ft 1 in (1.85 m)	180 lb (82 kg)	Dec 18, 2019
Chase Contreraz; PK	Recruit ratings: Rivals: 247Sports: ESPN:				
Casey Doernemann; DL	West Point, NE	Guardian Angels Central Catholic	6 ft 5 in (1.96 m)	250 lb (110 kg)	Dec 18, 2019
Casey Doernemann; DL	Recruit ratings: Rivals: 247Sports: ESPN:				
Broc Douglass; WR	Grand Island, NE	Grand Island	6 ft 0 in (1.83 m)	160 lb (73 kg)	Dec 18, 2019
Broc Douglass; WR	Recruit ratings: Rivals: 247Sports: ESPN:				
Isaac Gifford; DB	Lincoln, NE	Lincoln Southeast	6 ft 1 in (1.85 m)	195 lb (88 kg)	Dec 18, 2019
Isaac Gifford; DB	Recruit ratings: Rivals: 247Sports: ESPN:				
Ty Hahn; WR	Johnson, NE	Johnson-Brock	6 ft 2 in (1.88 m)	180 lb (82 kg)	Dec 18, 2019
Ty Hahn; WR	Recruit ratings: Rivals: 247Sports: ESPN:				
Ashton Hausmann; DB	Roca, NE	Norris	6 ft 0 in (1.83 m)	190 lb (86 kg)	Dec 18, 2019
Ashton Hausmann; DB	Recruit ratings: Rivals: 247Sports: ESPN:				
Braden Klover; LB	Wymore, NE	Southern	6 ft 1 in (1.85 m)	220 lb (100 kg)	Dec 18, 2019
Braden Klover; LB	Recruit ratings: Rivals: 247Sports: ESPN:				
Trevin Luben; RB	Wahoo, NE	Wahoo	6 ft 0 in (1.83 m)	170 lb (77 kg)	Dec 18, 2019
Trevin Luben; RB	Recruit ratings: Rivals: 247Sports: ESPN:				
Keegan Menning; OL	Fremont, NE	Fremont	6 ft 4 in (1.93 m)	310 lb (140 kg)	Dec 18, 2019
Keegan Menning; OL	Recruit ratings: Rivals: 247Sports: ESPN:				
Barron Miles Jr. DB	Chandler, AZ	Chandler	6 ft 0 in (1.83 m)	170 lb (77 kg)	Jun 16, 2020
Barron Miles Jr. DB	Recruit ratings: Rivals: 247Sports: ESPN:				
Mason Nieman; ATH	Waverly, NE	Waverly	6 ft 3 in (1.91 m)	175 lb (79 kg)	Dec 18, 2019
Mason Nieman; ATH	Recruit ratings: Rivals: 247Sports: ESPN:				
Nouredin Nouili; OL	Frankfurt, Germany	Norris / Colorado State	6 ft 4 in (1.93 m)	285 lb (129 kg)	Dec 18, 2019
Nouredin Nouili; OL	Recruit ratings: Rivals: 247Sports: ESPN:				
Eli Simonson; OL	Fremont, NE	Archbishop Bergan	6 ft 5 in (1.96 m)	260 lb (120 kg)	Dec 18, 2019
Eli Simonson; OL	Recruit ratings: Rivals: 247Sports: ESPN:				
Grant Tagge; LB	Omaha, NE	Omaha Westside	6 ft 2 in (1.88 m)	185 lb (84 kg)	Dec 18, 2019
Grant Tagge; LB	Recruit ratings: Rivals: 247Sports: ESPN:				
Xavier Trevino; OL	Lincoln, NE	Lincoln Southeast	6 ft 1 in (1.85 m)	275 lb (125 kg)	Dec 18, 2019
Xavier Trevino; OL	Recruit ratings: Rivals: 247Sports: ESPN:				
Camden Witucki; LS	Grand Blanc, MI	Grand Blanc	6 ft 3 in (1.91 m)	220 lb (100 kg)	Dec 18, 2019
Camden Witucki; LS	Recruit ratings: Rivals: 247Sports: ESPN:				
Overall recruit ranking:
Note: In many cases, Scout, Rivals, 247Sports, On3, and ESPN may conflict in their listings of height and weight.; In these cases, the average was taken. ESPN grades are on a 100-point scale.; Sources: "2020 Team Ranking". Rivals.com.

== Preseason ==
=== Award watch lists ===
Award	Player	Position	Year
Doak Walker Award	Dedrick Mills	RB	SR
John Mackey Award	Jack Stoll	TE	SR
Maxwell Award	Adrian Martinez	QB	JR
Paul Hornung Award	Wan'Dale Robinson	WR	SO
Wuerffel Trophy	Ben Stille	DL	SR

=== Preseason media polls ===
Below are the results of the media poll with total points received next to each school and first-place votes in parentheses. For the 2020 poll, Ohio State was voted as the favorite to win both the East Division and the Big Ten Championship Game. This is the 10th iteration of the preseason media poll conducted by Cleveland.com, which polls at least one credentialed media member for each Big Ten team. Only twice in the last ten years has the media accurately predicted the Big Ten champion.

East
Predicted finish	Team	Votes (1st place)
1	Ohio State	237 (33)
2	Penn State	204 (1)
3	Michigan	169
4	Indiana	134
5	Michigan State	94
6	Maryland	76
7	Rutgers	38

West
Predicted finish	Team	Votes (1st place)
1	Wisconsin	221 (19)
2	Minnesota	209.5 (14)
3	Iowa	157
4	Nebraska	117
5	Purdue	105
6	Northwestern	87.5 (1)
7	Illinois	55

Media poll (Big Ten Championship)
Rank	Team	Votes
1	Ohio State over Wisconsin	19
2	Ohio State over Minnesota	13
3	Ohio State over Northwestern	1
4	Penn State over Minnesota	1

== Schedule ==
Nebraska had games scheduled against Central Michigan, South Dakota State, and Cincinnati, but canceled these games on July 9 due to the Big Ten Conference's decision to play a conference-only schedule due to the COVID-19 pandemic.

On September 19, the Big Ten announced a new league schedule to accommodate a new 9-game conference-only season, where the ninth game will feature cross divisional matchups of #1 vs #1, #2 vs. #2, etc.

On October 29, Nebraska attempted to replace the Wisconsin game with a game against FCS school Chattanooga. However, it was denied by the Big Ten Conference, which reaffirmed its policy against scheduling nonconference games for the 2020 season.

Date	Time	Opponent	Site	TV	Result	Attendance
October 24	11:00 a.m.	at No. 5 Ohio State	Ohio Stadium; Columbus, OH	FOX	L 17–52	1,344
October 31	2:30 p.m.	No. 9 Wisconsin	Memorial Stadium; Lincoln, NE (Freedom Trophy)	FS1	No Contest	–
November 7	11:00 a.m.	at Northwestern	Ryan Field; Evanston, IL	BTN	L 13–21	0
November 14	11:00 a.m.	Penn State	Memorial Stadium; Lincoln, NE	FS1	W 30–23	0
November 21	11:00 a.m.	Illinois	Memorial Stadium; Lincoln, NE	FS1	L 23–41	0
November 27	12:00 p.m.	at No. 24 Iowa	Kinnick Stadium; Iowa City, IA (Heroes Trophy)	FOX	L 20–26	1,469
December 5	11:00 a.m.	at Purdue	Ross-Ade Stadium; West Lafayette, IN	BTN	W 37–27	808
December 12	11:00 a.m.	Minnesota	Memorial Stadium; Lincoln, NE ($5 Bits of Broken Chair Trophy)	FS1	L 17–24	0
December 18	6:30 p.m.	at Rutgers	SHI Stadium; Piscataway, NJ	BTN	W 28–21	0
Rankings from AP Poll released prior to the game; All times are in Central time

Nebraska's game with Wisconsin was canceled due to a COVID-19 outbreak at Wisconsin. The game was not rescheduled. Instead, both teams had a bye week and played only eight conference games.

Nebraska's game with Rutgers was adjusted from a 3:00 p.m. to a 6:30 p.m. kickoff time on Friday, December 18, after the cancellation of the Indiana-Purdue game.

== Roster and coaching staff ==
2020 Nebraska Cornhuskers football team roster
Players
Coaches
Offense

Pos.	#	Name	Class
TE	11	Austin Allen	Jr
OL	72	Matthew Anderson	RFr
WR	84	Matthias Algarin	Fr
OL	73	Broc Bando	Jr
WR	36	Christian Banker	Jr
OL	74	Brant Banks	RFr
OL	66	Bladen Bayless	Fr
RB	30	Brody Belt	So
OL	54	Bryce Benhart	RFr
WR	15	Zavier Betts	Fr
OL	59	Ian Boerkircher	So
TE	49	Nate Boerkircher	Fr
WR	4	Alante Brown	Fr
WR	41	Elliott Brown	Fr
TE	80	Jared Bubak	Sr
WR	45	Ty Chaffin	Sr
OL	79	Alex Conn	Fr
OL	69	Turner Corcoran	Fr
WR	42	Broc Douglass	Fr
WR	88	Levi Falck	Sr
OL	71	Matt Farniok (C)	Sr
OL	68	Will Farniok	So
WR	6	Marcus Fleming	Fr
WR	29	Bennett Folkers	So
OL	78	Jimmy Fritzsche	RFr
OL	65	Christian Gaylord	GS
TE	46	John Goodwin	RFr
WR	17	Ty Hahn	Fr
RB	37	Isaiah Harris	Fr
WR	87	Chris Hickman	RFr
OL	75	Trent Hixson	Jr
WR	10	Demariyon Houston	RFr
WR	47	Austin Jablonski	RFr
OL	76	Brenden Jaimes	Sr
RB	22	Cooper Jewett	RFr
RB	14	Rahmir Johnson	RFr
OL	51	Cam Jurgens	So
WR	85	Wyatt Liewer	So
RB	35	Trevin Luben	Fr
OL	77	Michael Lynn	RFr
WR	5	Omar Manning	Jr
WR	89	Oliver Martin	Jr
QB	2	Adrian Martinez (C)	Jr
QB	18	Matt Masker	So
QB	7	Luke McCaffrey	RFr
OL	71	Keegan Menning	Fr
WR	19	Barron Miles Jr.	Fr
QB	14	Brayden Miller	RFr
RB	26	Dedrick Mills	Sr
RB	28	Sevion Morrison	Fr
OL	53	Riley Moses	RFr
WR	3	Jamie Nance	RFr
WR	12	Will Nixon	Fr
OL	63	Nouredin Nouili	So
OL	67	Ezra Miller	RFr
TE	40	Brian Perez	Sr
OL	57	Ethan Piper	RFr
RB	34	Beau Psencik	Fr
TE	82	Kurt Rafdal	Jr
WR/RB	1	Wan'Dale Robinson	So
RB	43	Connor Ruth	So
RB	46	Corbin Ruth	Jr
RB	24	Marvin Scott III	Fr
OL	70	Matt Sichterman	Jr
OL	76	Eli Simonson	Fr
QB	8	Logan Smothers	Fr
TE	86	Jack Stoll	Sr
RB	25	Ronald Thompkins	RFr
TE	83	Travis Vokolek	Jr
WR	81	Kade Warner (C)	Jr
RB	31	Zach Weinmaster	RFr
OL	56	Boe Wilson	Sr
RB	23	Jaquez Yant	Fr

Defense

Pos.	#	Name	Class
OLB	45	David Alston	So
ILB	50	Jake Archer	So
DL	96	Marquis Black	Fr
CB	7	Dicaprio Bootle (C)	Sr
DL	73	Baylor Brannen	Fr
OLB	85	John Bullock	RFr
CB	39	Bradley Bunner	Jr
OLB	35	Jimari Butler	Fr
ILB	58	Chris Cassidy	So
CB	11	Braxton Clark (injured)	So
OLB	32	Niko Cooper	So
DL	93	Damion Daniels	Jr
CB	0	Ronald Delancy III	Fr
S	9	Marquel Dismuke	Sr
OLB	13	JoJo Domann	Sr
S	18	Myles Farmer	RFr
DL	82	Colton Feist	So
S	23	Isaac Gifford	Fr
DL	89	Jamin Graham	RFr
DL	4	Keem Green	Jr
OLB	24	Blaise Gunnerson	Fr
S	47	Tyson Guzman	RFr
ILB	10	Jackson Hannah	RFr
DB	29	Ashton Hausmann	Fr
ILB	42	Nick Heinrich	RFr
DL	80	Jacob Herbek	RFr
ILB	3	Will Honas	Sr
ILB	39	Garrett Hustedt	RFr
DL	72	Nash Hutmacher	Fr
OLB	38	Damian Jackson	Jr
CB	16	Nadab Joseph	So
LB	51	Braden Klover	Fr
OLB	81	Nick Leader	RFr
DL	90	Ben Lingenfelter	Jr
CB	12	Tamon Lynum	Fr
ILB	22	Eteva Mauga-Clements	Jr
S	48	Lane McCallum	Jr
ILB	59	Caden McCormack	RFr
ILB	31	Collin Miller (C)	Sr
ILB	57	Drew Monin	Fr
DB	40	Darius Moore	Jr
OLB	44	Garrett Nelson	So
DL	52	Mosai Newsom	RFr
CB	6	Quinton Newsome	So
S	43	Mason Nieman	Fr
OLB	34	Simon Otte	So
OLB	49	Pheldarius Payne	Jr
S	21	Noa Pola-Gates	RFr
ILB	28	Luke Reimer	So
DL	84	Eli Richter	RFr
DL	87	Jordon Riley	Jr
DL	99	Ty Robinson	RFr
DL	98	Casey Rogers	So
CB	37	Phalen Sanford	So
ILB	25	Zach Schlager	So
OLB	54	Ryan Schommer	So
OLB	83	Sam Shurtleff	RFr
ILB	41	Garrett Snodgrass	RFr
DL	95	Ben Stille	Sr
LB	56	Grant Tagge	Fr
OLB	2	Caleb Tannor	Jr
CB	5	Cam Taylor-Britt	Jr
DL	97	Deontre Thomas	Jr
DL	55	Chris Walker	Jr
DL	92	Tate Wildeman	So
S	8	Deontai Williams	Sr
DB	33	Javin Wright (injured)	RFr

Special teams

Pos.	#	Name	Class
LS	55	Brig Banks	Jr
PK	36	Chase Contreraz	So
P	40	Daniel Cerni	Fr
PK/P	96	Tyler Crawford	Fr
PK	33	Connor Culp	Sr
P	95	Grant Detlefsen	RFr
PK	93	Gabe Heins	RFr
P	30	Sam Khawja	Fr
LS	94	Cade Mueller	So
PK	32	Ryan Novosel	Fr
LS	91	Cameron Pieper	So
P	90	William Przystup	So
LS	98	Camden Witucki	Fr

Head coach

- Scott Frost
  5th season as HC
  3rd year at Nebraska
  Alma mater: Nebraska

Coordinators/assistant coaches

- Erik Chinander
  5th season as DC
  3rd year at Nebraska
  Alma mater: Iowa
- Matt Lubick
  18th season as WR coach, 4th as OC
  1st year at Nebraska
  Alma mater: Colorado State
- Greg Austin
  8th season as OL coach
  3rd year at Nebraska
  Alma mater: Nebraska
- Sean Beckton
  5th season as TE coach
  3rd year at Nebraska
  Alma mater: Central Florida
- Mike Dawson
  7th season as LB coach
  2nd year at Nebraska
  Alma mater: UMass-Amherst
- Travis Fisher
  9th season as DB coach
  3rd year at Nebraska
  Alma mater: Central Florida
- Ryan Held
  5th season as RB coach
  3rd year at Nebraska
  Alma mater: Nebraska
- Barrett Ruud
  3rd season as ILB coach
  3rd year at Nebraska
  Alma mater: Nebraska
- Tony Tuioti
  5th season as DL coach
  2nd year at Nebraska
  Alma mater: Hawaii
- Mario Verduzco
  28th season as QB coach
  3rd year at Nebraska
  Alma mater: San Jose St.

Legend

- (C) Team captain
- (S) Suspended
- (I) Ineligible
- Injured
- Redshirt

Roster
Last update: August 10, 2020

== Depth Chart start of season ==
Defense

FS
9 Marquel Dismuke
21 Noa Pola-Gates
⋅

NICKEL	LB	LB
13 JoJo Domann	3 Will Honas	31 Collin Miller
⋅	28 Luke Reimer	41 Garrett Snodgrass
⋅	⋅	⋅

SS
8 Deontai Williams
18 Myles Farmer
⋅

CB
5 Cam Taylor-Britt
6 Quinton Newsome
⋅

DE	DT	DT	DE
44 Garrett Nelson	99 Ty Robinson	95 Ben Stille	2 Caleb Tannor
49 Pheldarius Payne	93 Damion Daniels	98 Casey Rogers	42 Nick Henrich
⋅	⋅	⋅	⋅

CB
7 Dicaprio Bootle
0 Ronald Delancy
⋅

Offense

WR
1 Wan'Dale Robinson
4 Alante Brown
⋅

WR
81 Kade Warner
6 Marcus Fleming
⋅

LT	LG	C	RG	RT
76 Brenden Jaimes	56 Boe Wilson	51 Cam Jurgens	71 Matt Farniok	54 Bryce Benhart
69 Turner Corcoran	57 Ethan Piper	75 Trent Hixson	73 Broc Bando	74 Brant Banks
⋅	⋅	⋅	⋅	⋅

TE
86 Jack Stoll
11 Austin Allen
83 Travis Vokolek

WR
88 Levi Falck
85 Wyatt Liewer
⋅

QB
2 Adrian Martinez
7 Luke McCaffrey
⋅

Key reserves

Special teams
PK Connor Culp
P William Przystup
KR Alante Brown
PR Cam Taylor-Britt
LS Cade Mueller

RB
26 Dedrick Mills
25 Ronald Thompkins
24 Marvin Scott

=== Depth Chart End of season ===
Defense

FS
Marquel Dismuke
Myles Farmer
⋅

OLB	ILB	ILB	OLB
JoJo Domann	Will Honas	Luke Reimer	Garrett Nelson
Pheldarius Payne	Nick Henrich	Garrett Snodgrass	Caleb Tannor
⋅	⋅	⋅	⋅

SS
Deontai Williams
Noa Pola-Gates
⋅

CB
Cam Taylor-Britt
Quinton Newsome
⋅

DE	NT	DE
Ty Robinson	Damion Daniels	Ben Stille
Keem Green	Jordan Reily	Casey Rogers
⋅	⋅	⋅

CB
Dicaprio Bootle
Tamon Lynum
⋅

Offense

WR
Wan'Dale Robinson
Alante Brown
⋅

WR
Kade Warner
Zavier Betts
Oliver Martin
⋅

LT	LG	C	RG	RT
Brenden Jaimes	Ethan Piper	Cam Jurgens	Matt Farniok	Bryce Benhart
Turner Corcoran	Trent Hixson	Matt Farniok	Boe Wilson	Brant Banks
⋅	⋅	⋅	⋅	⋅

TE
Austin Allen
Travis Vokolek
Jack Stoll

WR
Levi Falck
Wyatt Liewer
⋅

QB
Adrian Martinez
Luke McCaffrey
⋅

Key reserves
Season-ending injury Number of games played ()
ILB Collin Miller (4)
CB Braxton Clark (0)
NB Javin Wright (0)
DL Deontre Thomas (2)

Special teams
PK Connor Culp
P Williams Przystup
KR Alante Brown
PR Cam Taylor-Britt

RB
Dedrick Mills
Wan'Dale Robinson
Marvin Scott
Rahmir Johnson

== Game summaries ==
=== at No. 5 Ohio State ===
Nebraska Cornhuskers (0–0) at No. 5 Ohio State Buckeyes (0–0) – Game summary

Quarter	1	2	3	4	Total
Cornhuskers	7	7	3	0	17
No. 5 Buckeyes	14	10	14	14	52

at Ohio Stadium • Columbus, OH

- Date: October 24, 2020
- Game time: 12:00 p.m. EST
- Game weather: Cloudy, 46 °F (8 °C)
- Game attendance: 1,344
- Referee: Reggie Smith
- TV announcers (FOX): Gus Johnson (play-by-play), Joel Klatt (analyst), Jenny Taft (sideline)

Game information

First quarter

- (13:09) NEB – Adrian Martinez 10-yard run, Connor Culp kick (Drive: 4 plays, 75 yards, 1:51; Nebraska 7–0)
- (8:04) OSU – Master Teague 1-yard run, Blake Haubeil kick (Drive: 11 plays, 75 yards, 5:05; Tied 7–7)
- (4:02) OSU – Garrett Wilson 42-yard pass from Justin Fields, Blake Haubeil kick (Drive: 6 plays, 76 yards, 2:18; Ohio State 14–7)

Second quarter

- (8:24) NEB – Dedrick Mills 3-yard run, Connor Culp kick (Drive: 11 plays, 78 yards, 5:17; Tied 14–14)
- (3:12) OSU – Blake Haubeil 34-yard field goal (Drive: 11 plays, 70 yards, 5:12; Ohio State 17–14)
- (1:10) OSU – Master Teague 6-yard run, Blake Haubeil kick (Drive: 5 plays, 46 yards, 1:15; Ohio State 24–14)

Third quarter

- (11:24) OSU – Justin Fields 17-yard run, Blake Haubeil kick (Drive: 8 plays, 75 yards, 3:36; Ohio State 31–14)
- (8:02) OSU – Sevyn Banks 55-yard fumble return, Blake Haubeil kick (Drive: 7 plays, 30 yards, 3:22; Ohio State 38–14)
- (3:56) NEB – Connor Culp 22-yard field goal (Drive: 9 plays, 72 yards, 4:06; Ohio State 38–17)

Fourth quarter

- (9:58) OSU – Jaxon Smith-Njigba 5-yard pass from Justin Fields, Blake Haubeil kick (Drive: 7 plays, 42 yards, 3:18; Ohio State 45–17)
- (0:18) OSU – Jack Miller 2-yard run, Blake Haubeil kick (Drive: 6 plays, 40 yards, 2:35; Ohio State 52–17)

Statistics	NEB	OSU
First downs	17	28
Total yards	370	491
Rushes/yards	36–210	48–215
Passing yards	160	276
Passing: Comp–Att–Int	16–20–0	20–21–0
Time of possession	26:46	33:14

Team	Category	Player	Statistics
Nebraska	Passing	Adrian Martinez	12/15, 105 yards
Nebraska	Rushing	Adrian Martinez	13 carries, 85 yards, TD
Nebraska	Receiving	Wan'Dale Robinson	6 receptions, 49 yards
Ohio State	Passing	Justin Fields	20/21, 276 yards, 2 TD
Ohio State	Rushing	Justin Fields	15 carries, 54 yards, TD
Ohio State	Receiving	Garrett Wilson	7 receptions, 129 yards, TD

=== vs Wisconsin ===
No. 9 Wisconsin Badgers (1–0) vs Nebraska Cornhuskers (0–1) – Game summary

Quarter	1	2	3	4	Total
No. 9 Badgers	0	0	0	0	0
Cornhuskers	0	0	0	0	0

at Memorial Stadium • Lincoln, NE

- Date: October 31, 2020
- Game time: Cancelled
- TV: FS1

The Wisconsin at Nebraska game was canceled due to a COVID-19 outbreak at Wisconsin. The game will not be rescheduled. Instead, both teams will have a bye and will have just seven games.

=== at Northwestern ===
Nebraska Cornhuskers (0–1) at Northwestern Wildcats (2–0) – Game summary

Quarter	1	2	3	4	Total
Cornhuskers	0	13	0	0	13
Wildcats	7	0	7	7	21

at Ryan Field • Evanston, IL

- Date: November 7, 2020
- Game time: 11:00 a.m.
- Game weather: Sunny, 66 °F (19 °C)
- Game attendance: 0
- Referee: Jerry McGinn
- TV announcers (BTN): Cory Provus (play-by-play), Jeremy Leman (analyst), Olivia Harlan (sideline)

Game information

First quarter

- (8:29) NW – Drake Anderson 41-yard run, Charlie Kuhbander kick (Drive: 7 plays, 80 yards, 2:43; Northwestern 7–0)

Second quarter

- (11:29) NEB – Connor Culp 38-yard field goal (Drive: 14 plays, 56 yards, 5:33; Northwestern 7–3)
- (8:54) NEB – Connor Culp 36-yard field goal (Drive: 6 plays, 34 yards, 1:57; Northwestern 7–6)
- (1:25) NEB – Dedrick Mills 3-yard run, Connor Culp kick (Drive: 1 play, 3 yards, 0:07; Nebraska 13–7)

Third quarter

- (9:54) NW – John Raine 2-yard pass from Peyton Ramsey, Charlie Kuhbander kick (Drive: 10 plays, 61 yards, 5:47; Northwestern 14–13)

Fourth quarter

- (9:53) NW – Riley Lees 10-yard pass from Peyton Ramsey, Charlie Kuhbander kick (Drive: 6 plays, 44 yards, 3:13; Northwestern 21–13)

Statistics	NEB	NW
First downs	28	14
Total yards	442	317
Rushes/yards	43–224	38–148
Passing yards	218	169
Passing: Comp–Att–Int	24–45–2	16–27–2
Time of possession	32:27	27:33

Team	Category	Player	Statistics
Nebraska	Passing	Adrian Martinez	12/27, 125 yards, INT
Nebraska	Rushing	Adrian Martinez	13 carries, 102 yards
Nebraska	Receiving	Marcus Fleming	5 receptions, 75 yards
Northwestern	Passing	Peyton Ramsey	16/27, 169 yards, 2 TD, 2 INT
Northwestern	Rushing	Drake Anderson	18 carries, 89 yards, TD
Northwestern	Receiving	John Raine	4 receptions, 33 yards, TD

=== vs Penn State ===
Penn State Nittany Lions (0–3) vs Nebraska Cornhuskers (0–2) – Game summary

Quarter	1	2	3	4	Total
Nittany Lions	0	6	10	7	23
Cornhuskers	10	17	0	3	30

at Memorial Stadium • Lincoln, NE

- Date: November 14, 2020
- Game time: 11:00 a.m.
- Game weather: Sunny, 52 °F (11 °C)
- Game attendance: 0
- Referee: Larry Smith
- TV announcers (FS1): Brian Custer (play-by-play), Robert Smith (analyst)

Game information

First quarter

- (11:25) NEB – Luke McCaffrey 1-yard run, Connor Culp kick (Drive: 11 plays, 75 yards, 3:35; Nebraska 7–0)
- (6:14) NEB – Connor Culp 22-yard field goal (Drive: 6 plays, 10 yards, 1:56; Nebraska 10–0)

Second quarter

- (14:50) PSU – Jake Pinegar 33-yard field goal (Drive: 14 plays, 66 yards, 6:20; Nebraska 10–3)
- (14:01) NEB – Zavier Betts 45-yard pass from Luke McCaffrey, Connor Culp kick (Drive: 3 plays, 65 yards, 0:49; Nebraska 17–3)
- (11:29) NEB – Deontai Williams 26-yard fumble return, Connor Culp kick (Drive: 5 plays, 5 yards, 2:25; Nebraska 24–3)
- (5:48) PSU – Jake Pinegar 40-yard field goal (Drive: 13 plays, 52 yards, 5:41; Nebraska 24–6)
- (0:00) NEB – Connor Culp 25-yard field goal (Drive: 11 plays, 35 yards, 1:39; Nebraska 27–6)

Third quarter

- (7:51) PSU – Keyvone Lee 31-yard run, Jake Pinegar kick (Drive: 6 plays, 82 yards, 2:53; Nebraska 27–13)
- (1:01) PSU – Jake Pinegar 27-yard field goal (Drive: 10 plays, 42 yards, 5:03; Nebraska 27–16)

Fourth quarter

- (10:34) NEB – Connor Culp 30-yard field goal (Drive: 10 plays, 63 yards, 5:27; Nebraska 30–16)
- (9:20) PSU – Devyn Ford 5-yard run, Jake Pinegar kick (Drive: 4 plays, 75 yards, 1:14; Nebraska 30–23)

Statistics	PSU	NEB
First downs	30	17
Total yards	501	298
Rushes/yards	52–245	39–146
Passing yards	256	152
Passing: Comp–Att–Int	19–39–1	13–21–1
Time of possession	36:24	23:36

Team	Category	Player	Statistics
Penn State	Passing	Will Levis	14/31, 219 yards
Penn State	Rushing	Devyn Ford	16 carries, 66 yards, TD
Penn State	Receiving	Pat Freiermuth	7 receptions, 113 yards
Nebraska	Passing	Luke McCaffrey	13/21, 152 yards, TD, INT
Nebraska	Rushing	Luke McCaffrey	13 carries, 67 yards, TD
Nebraska	Receiving	Zavier Betts	2 receptions, 54 yards, TD

=== vs Illinois ===
Illinois Fighting Illini (1–3) vs Nebraska Cornhuskers (1–2) – Game summary

Quarter	1	2	3	4	Total
Fighting Illini	14	14	10	3	41
Cornhuskers	7	3	7	6	23

at Memorial Stadium • Lincoln, NE

- Date: November 21, 2020
- Game time: 11:00 a.m.
- Game weather: Cloudy, 45 °F (7 °C)
- Game attendance: 0
- Referee: John O'Neill
- TV announcers (FS1): Brian Custer (play-by-play), Robert Smith (analyst)

Game information

First quarter

- (13:31) ILL – Chase Brown 3-yard run, James McCourt kick (Drive: 3 plays, 21 yards, 1:17; Illinois 7–0)
- (9:20) NEB – Luke McCaffrey 5-yard run, Connor Culp kick (Drive: 12 plays, 71 yards, 4:05; Tied 7–7)
- (5:39) ILL – Chase Brown 2-yard run, James McCourt kick (Drive: 9 plays, 75 yards, 3:41; Illinois 14–7)

Second quarter

- (13:48) ILL – Josh Imatorbhebhe 28-yard pass from Brandon Peters, James McCourt kick (Drive: 7 plays, 65 yards, 3:44; Illinois 21–7)
- (7:32) NEB – Connor Culp 30-yard field goal (Drive: 10 plays, 52 yards, 4:00; Illinois 21–10)
- (5:50) ILL – Mike Epstein 1-yard run, James McCourt kick (Drive: 4 plays, 89 yards, 1:35; Illinois 28–10)

Third quarter

- (8:23) ILL – James McCourt 24-yard field goal (Drive: 16 plays, 65 yards, 6:31; Illinois 31–10)
- (6:48) NEB – Luke McCaffrey 1-yard run, Connor Culp kick (Drive: 6 plays, 75 yards, 1:35; Illinois 31–17)
- (2:31) ILL – Brandon Peters 1-yard run, James McCourt kick (Drive: 10 plays, 75 yards, 4:17; Illinois 38–17)

Fourth quarter

- (10:14) ILL – James McCourt 21-yard field goal (Drive: 12 plays, 41 yards, 5:42; Illinois 41–17)
- (2:12) NEB – Levi Falck 4-yard pass from Adrian Martinez (Drive: 7 plays, 54 yards, 1:58; Illinois 41–23)

Statistics	ILL	NEB
First downs	25	25
Total yards	490	392
Rushes/yards	52–285	44–215
Passing yards	205	177
Passing: Comp–Att–Int	18–25–0	18–30–3
Time of possession	36:21	23:39

Team	Category	Player	Statistics
Illinois	Passing	Brandon Peters	18/25, 205 yards, TD
Illinois	Rushing	Mike Epstein	13 carries, 113 yards, TD
Illinois	Receiving	Josh Imatorbhebhe	4 receptions, 71 yards, TD
Nebraska	Passing	Luke McCaffrey	15/26, 134 yards, 3 INT
Nebraska	Rushing	Luke McCaffrey	26 carries, 122 yards, 2 TD
Nebraska	Receiving	Wan'Dale Robinson	6 receptions, 60 yards

=== at No. 24 Iowa ===
Nebraska Cornhuskers (1–3) at No. 24 Iowa Hawkeyes (3–2) – Game summary

Quarter	1	2	3	4	Total
Cornhuskers	0	13	7	0	20
No. 24 Hawkeyes	10	3	7	6	26

at Kinnick Stadium • Iowa City, IA

- Date: November 27, 2020
- Game time: 12:00 p.m.
- Game weather: Partly cloudy, 40 °F (4 °C)
- Game attendance: 1,469
- Referee: Ron Snodgrass
- TV announcers (FOX): Brian Custer (play-by-play), Robert Smith (analyst)

Game information

First quarter

- (12:06) IOWA – Keith Duncan 32-yard field goal (Drive: 7 plays, 54 yards, 2:54; Iowa 3–0)
- (1:09) IOWA – Tyrone Tracy 6-yard pass from Spencer Petras, Keith Duncan kick (Drive: 6 plays, 46 yards, 2:53; Iowa 10–0)

Second quarter

- (12:35) NEB – Connor Culp 31-yard field goal (Drive: 11 plays, 62 yards, 3:34; Iowa 10–3)
- (9:42) NEB – Connor Culp 39-yard field goal (Drive: 6 plays, 22 yards, 2:02; Iowa 10–6)
- (3:48) IOWA – Keith Duncan 33-yard field goal (Drive: 12 plays, 55 yards, 5:54; Iowa 13–6)
- (0:29) NEB – Adrian Martinez 1-yard run, Connor Culp kick (Drive: 11 plays, 75 yards, 3:19; Tied 13–13)

Third quarter

- (12:05) NEB – Rahmir Johnson 12-yard run, Connor Culp kick (Drive: 8 plays, 70 yards, 2:55; Nebraska 20–13)
- (5:47) IOWA – Mekhi Sargent 2-yard run, Keith Duncan kick (Drive: 14 plays, 66 yards, 6:18; Tied 20–20)

Fourth quarter

- (14:55) IOWA – Keith Duncan 48-yard field goal (Drive: 8 plays, 30 yards, 4:03; Iowa 23–20)
- (8:21) IOWA – Keith Duncan 37-yard field goal (Drive: 6 plays, 19 yards, 1:54; Iowa 26–20)

Statistics	NEB	IOWA
First downs	20	22
Total yards	338	322
Rushes/yards	38–143	45–129
Passing yards	195	193
Passing: Comp–Att–Int	21–25–0	18–30–1
Time of possession	25:36	34:24

Team	Category	Player	Statistics
Nebraska	Passing	Adrian Martinez	18/20, 174 yards
Nebraska	Rushing	Luke McCaffrey	5 carries, 42 yards
Nebraska	Receiving	Wan'Dale Robinson	9 receptions, 75 yards
Iowa	Passing	Spencer Petras	18/30, 193 yards, TD, INT
Iowa	Rushing	Tyler Goodson	30 carries, 111 yards
Iowa	Receiving	Ihmir Smith-Marsette	3 receptions, 44 yards

=== at Purdue ===
Nebraska Cornhuskers (1–4) at Purdue Boilermakers (2–3) – Game summary

Quarter	1	2	3	4	Total
Cornhuskers	17	10	7	3	37
Boilermakers	3	10	7	7	27

at Ross-Ade Stadium • West Lafayette, IN

- Date: December 5, 2020
- Game time: 12:00 p.m. EST
- Game weather: Cloudy, 40 °F (4 °C)
- Game attendance: 808
- Referee: Reggie Smith
- TV announcers (BTN): Cory Provus (play-by-play), Anthony Herron (analyst), Coley Harvey (sideline)

Game information

First quarter

- (12:30) NEB – Dedrick Mills 1-yard run, Connor Culp kick (Drive: 1 play, 1 yard, 0:02; Nebraska 7–0)
- (10:04) NEB – Adrian Martinez 13-yard run, Connor Culp kick (Drive: 3 plays, 17 yards, 1:05; Nebraska 14–0)
- (5:59) NEB – Connor Culp 25-yard field goal (Drive: 8 plays, 37 yards, 2:40; Nebraska 17–0)
- (1:02) PUR – J. D. Dellinger 45-yard field goal (Drive: 10 plays, 46 yards, 4:57; Nebraska 17–3)

Second quarter

- (12:22) NEB – Connor Culp 49-yard field goal (Drive: 9 plays, 44 yards, 3:40; Nebraska 20–3)
- (10:04) PUR – King Doerue 20-yard pass from Jack Plummer, J. D. Dellinger kick (Drive: 6 plays, 56 yards, 2:18; Nebraska 20–10)
- (6:13) NEB – Wyatt Liewer 10-yard pass from Adrian Martinez, Connor Culp kick (Drive: 8 plays, 65 yards, 3:51; Nebraska 27–10)
- (0:00) PUR – J. D. Dellinger 27-yard field goal (Drive: 4 plays, 11 yards, 0:19; Nebraska 27–13)

Third quarter

- (10:05) NEB – Adrian Martinez 1-yard run, Connor Culp kick (Drive: 11 plays, 75 yards, 4:55; Nebraska 34–13)
- (1:29) PUR – Payne Durham 20-yard pass from Jack Plummer, J. D. Dellinger kick (Drive: 6 plays, 61 yards, 1:59; Nebraska 34–20)

Fourth quarter

- (12:16) PUR – David Bell 89-yard pass from Jack Plummer, J. D. Dellinger kick (Drive: 2 plays, 86 yards, 0:46; Nebraska 34–27)
- (7:04) NEB – Connor Culp 32-yard field goal (Drive: 8 plays, 79 yards, 5:12; Nebraska 37–27)

Statistics	NEB	PUR
First downs	20	19
Total yards	364	332
Rushes/yards	40–111	17–-2
Passing yards	253	334
Passing: Comp–Att–Int	24–31–0	33–47–0
Time of possession	33:49	26:11

Team	Category	Player	Statistics
Nebraska	Passing	Adrian Martinez	23/30, 242 yards, TD
Nebraska	Rushing	Dedrick Mills	16 carries, 60 yards, TD
Nebraska	Receiving	Wan'Dale Robinson	9 receptions, 114 yards
Purdue	Passing	Jack Plummer	33/47, 334 yards, 3 TD
Purdue	Rushing	Zander Horvath	7 carries, 21 yards
Purdue	Receiving	David Bell	10 receptions, 132 yards, TD

=== vs Minnesota ===
Minnesota Golden Gophers (2–3) vs Nebraska Cornhuskers (2–4) – Game summary

Quarter	1	2	3	4	Total
Golden Gophers	10	7	0	7	24
Cornhuskers	0	14	0	3	17

at Memorial Stadium • Lincoln, NE

- Date: December 12, 2020
- Game time: 11:00 a.m.
- Game weather: Cloudy, 32 °F (0 °C)
- Game attendance: 0
- Referee: Jeff Servinski
- TV announcers (FS1): Eric Collins (play-by-play), Ben Leber (analyst)

Game information

First quarter

- (7:26) MINN – Mohamed Ibrahim 26-yard run, Anders Gelecinskyj kick (Drive: 4 plays, 35 yards, 2:13; Minnesota 7–0)
- (0:14) MINN – Anders Gelecinskyj 31-yard field goal (Drive: 9 plays, 36 yards, 4:37; Minnesota 10–0)

Second quarter

- (13:12) NEB – Austin Allen 8-yard pass from Adrian Martinez, Connor Culp kick (Drive: 6 plays, 75 yards, 2:02; Minnesota 10–7)
- (2:57) NEB – Adrian Martinez 7-yard run, Connor Culp kick (Drive: 13 plays, 73 yards, 5:00; Nebraska 14–10)
- (1:23) MINN – Brevyn Spann-Ford 4-yard pass from Tanner Morgan, Anders Gelecinskyj kick (Drive: 6 plays, 75 yards, 1:34; Minnesota 17–14)

Third quarter

None

Fourth quarter

- (11:26) MINN – Mohamed Ibrahim 1-yard run, Anders Gelecinskyj kick (Drive: 9 plays, 39 yards, 3:55; Minnesota 24–14)
- (4:42) NEB – Connor Culp 30-yard field goal (Drive: 9 plays, 38 yards, 2:51; Minnesota 24–17)

Statistics	MINN	NEB
First downs	19	17
Total yards	387	308
Rushes/yards	43–206	36–197
Passing yards	181	111
Passing: Comp–Att–Int	17–30–0	16–29–1
Time of possession	35:28	24:12

Team	Category	Player	Statistics
Minnesota	Passing	Tanner Morgan	17/30, 181 yards, TD
Minnesota	Rushing	Mohamed Ibrahim	20 carries, 108 yards, 2 TD
Minnesota	Receiving	Chris Autman-Bell	5 receptions, 82 yards
Nebraska	Passing	Adrian Martinez	16/27, 111 yards, TD
Nebraska	Rushing	Adrian Martinez	15 carries, 96 yards, TD
Nebraska	Receiving	Wan'Dale Robinson	6 receptions, 41 yards

=== at Rutgers ===
Nebraska Cornhuskers (2–5) at Rutgers Scarlet Knights (3–5) – Game summary

Quarter	1	2	3	4	Total
Cornhuskers	0	7	14	7	28
Scarlet Knights	3	11	7	0	21

at SHI Stadium • Piscataway, NJ

- Date: December 18, 2020
- Game time: 7:30 p.m. EST
- Game weather: Clear, 25 °F (−4 °C)
- Game attendance: 0
- Referee: Reggie Smith
- TV announcers (BTN): Brandon Gaudin (play-by-play), James Laurinaitis (analyst), Coley Harvey

Game information

First quarter

- (8:55) RUTG – Valentino Ambrosio 36-yard field goal (Drive: 5 plays, 55 yards, 1:44; Rutgers 3–0)

Second quarter

- (13:20) RUTG – Valentino Ambrosio 42-yard field goal (Drive: 7 plays, 23 yards, 2:52; Rutgers 6–0)
- (10:07) NEB – Wan'Dale Robinson 1-yard run, Connor Culp kick (Drive: 9 plays, 75 yards, 3:13; Nebraska 7–6)
- (3:19) RUTG – Isiah Pacheco 33-yard run, Artur Sitkowski two-point pass to Bo Melton kick (Drive: 7 plays, 80 yards, 2:12; Rutgers 14–7)

Third quarter

- (9:06) NEB – Adrian Martinez 41-yard run, Connor Culp kick (Drive: 8 plays, 90 yards, 3:56; Tied 14–14)
- (8:53) RUTG – Aron Cruickshank 98-yard kickoff return, Valentino Ambrosio kick (Drive: 0 plays, 0 yards, 0:13; Rutgers 21–14)
- (0:43) NEB – Wan'Dale Robinson 14-yard pass from Adrian Martinez, Connor Culp kick (Drive: 11 plays, 96 yards, 5:09; Tied 21–21)

Fourth quarter

- (9:55) NEB – Adrian Martinez 1-yard run, Connor Culp kick (Drive: 9 plays, 92 yards, 4:07; Nebraska 28–21)

Statistics	NEB	RUTG
First downs	27	9
Total yards	620	252
Rushes/yards	58–365	30–130
Passing yards	255	122
Passing: Comp–Att–Int	24–28–2	11–22–1
Time of possession	39:31	20:29

Team	Category	Player	Statistics
Nebraska	Passing	Adrian Martinez	24/28, 255 yards, TD, 2 INT
Nebraska	Rushing	Dedrick Mills	25 carries, 191 yards
Nebraska	Receiving	Wan'Dale Robinson	6 receptions, 79 yards, TD
Rutgers	Passing	Artur Sitkowski	10/20, 122 yards
Rutgers	Rushing	Johnny Langan	9 carries, 54 yards
Rutgers	Receiving	Bo Melton	5 receptions, 81 yards

== Big Ten awards ==
=== All-Conference awards ===
2020 Big Ten Offense All-Conference Teams and Awards

Bakken-Andersen Kicker of the Year
Position	Player
PK	Connor Culp

Coaches All-Big Ten
Position	Player	Team
PK	Connor Culp	First Team
CB	Cam Taylor-Britt	Second Team
WR	Wan'Dale Robinson	Honorable Mention
OL	Matt Farniok	Honorable Mention
OL	Brenden Jaimes	Honorable Mention
DL	Ben Stille	Honorable Mention
LB	JoJo Domann	Honorable Mention
LB	Will Honas	Honorable Mention
S	Marquel Dismuke	Honorable Mention
S	Deontai Williams	Honorable Mention

Media All-Big Ten
Position	Player	Team
PK	Connor Culp	First Team
OL	Matt Farniok	Honorable Mention
OL	Brenden Jaimes	Honorable Mention
DL	Ben Stille	Honorable Mention
LB	JoJo Domann	Honorable Mention
LB	Will Honas	Honorable Mention
CB	Dicaprio Bootle	Honorable Mention
CB	Cam Taylor-Britt	Honorable Mention
S	Marquel Dismuke	Honorable Mention
S	Deontai Williams	Honorable Mention

== Rankings ==
Ranking movements Legend: ██ Increase in ranking ██ Decrease in ranking — = Not ranked RV = Received votes
	Week																	
Poll	Pre	1	2	3	4	5	6	7	8	9	10	11	12	13	14	15	16	Final
AP	—	—	—	—	—	—	—	—	—	—	—	—	—	—	—	—	—	
Coaches	RV	—	RV	RV	RV	RV	RV	—	—	—	—	—	—	—	—	—	—	
CFP	Not released												—	—	—	—	—	Not released

== Players drafted into the NFL ==
Round	Pick	Player	Position	NFL Club
5	159	Brenden Jaimes	OT	Los Angeles Chargers
7	238	Matt Farniok	OG	Dallas Cowboys
