= Dedrick Mills =

American gridiron football player (born 1996)

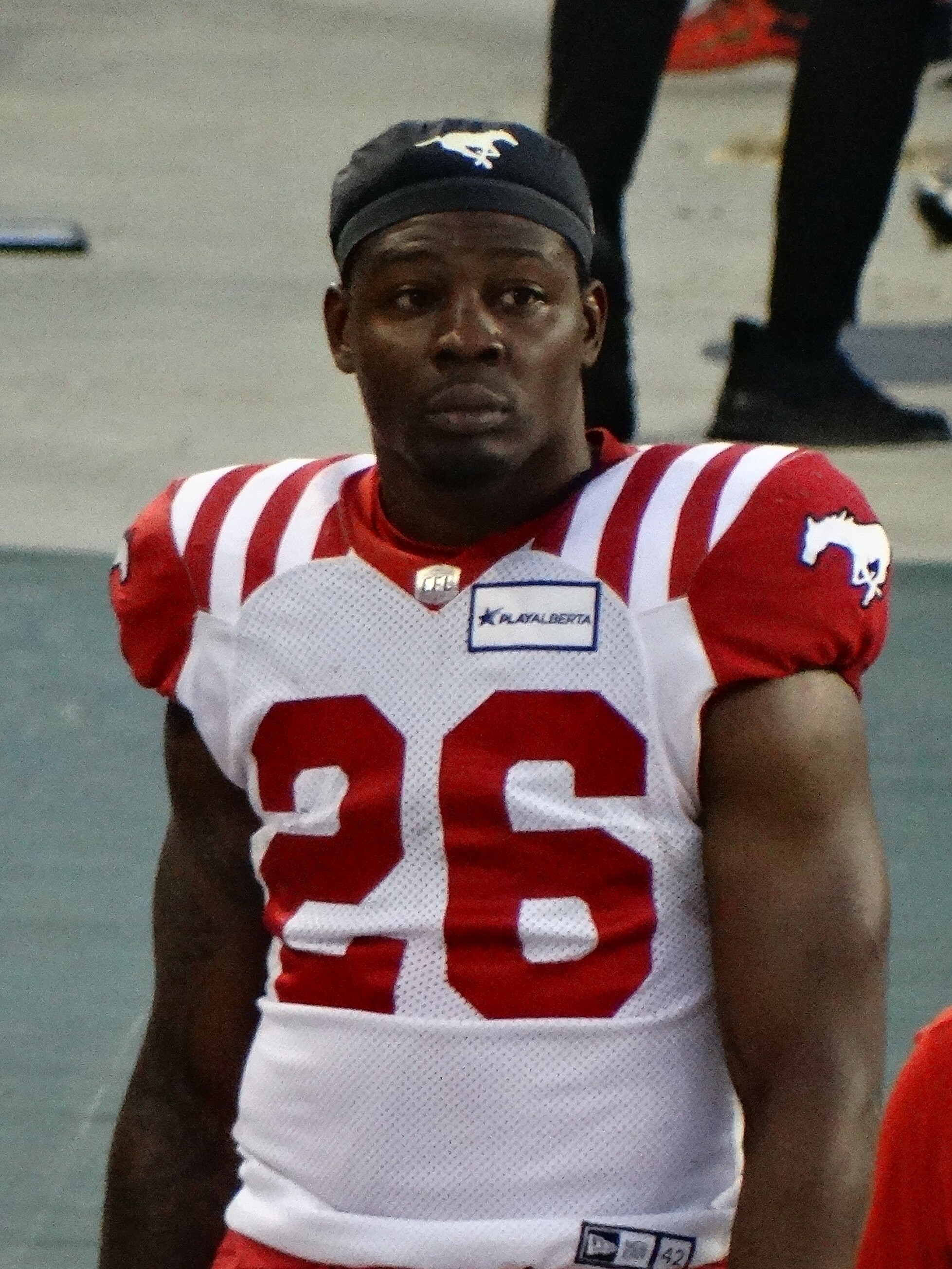
- Mills with the Calgary Stampeders in 2023

No. 26 – Calgary Stampeders
- Position: Running back
- Roster status: Active
- CFL status: American

Personal information
- Born: December 27, 1996 (age 29); Waycross, Georgia, U.S.
- Listed height: 5 ft 10 in (1.78 m)
- Listed weight: 225 lb (102 kg)

Career information
- High school: Ware County (GA)
- College: Georgia Tech (2016); Garden City (2017–2018); Nebraska (2019–2020)
- NFL draft: 2021: undrafted

Career history
- Detroit Lions (2021)*; Calgary Stampeders (2022–present)
- * Offseason or practice squad member only

Awards and highlights
- CFL All-Star (2025); CFL West All-CFL (2025)
- Stats at Pro Football Reference
- Stats at CFL.ca

Dedrick Mills (born December 27, 1996) is an American professional football running back for the Calgary Stampeders of the Canadian Football League (CFL). He played college football at Nebraska. Mills has also been a member of the Detroit Lions of the In the National Football League (NFL).

== College career ==
Mills began his collegiate career at Georgia Tech for one year, appearing in 9 games, before transferring to Garden City CC due to failing drug tests at Georgia Tech. After a year at Garden City, Mills transferred to Nebraska, where he played for two seasons and studied sports psychology, becoming an advocate for substance abuse prevention and mental-health awareness.

=== Statistics ===
| Season | Team | Games | | Rushing | | | | Receiving | | | |
| Season | Team | GP | GS | Att | Yds | Avg | TD | Rec | Yds | Avg | TD |
|---|---|---|---|---|---|---|---|---|---|---|---|
| 2016 | Georgia Tech | 9 | 7 | 152 | 771 | 5.1 | 12 | 2 | 13 | 6.5 | 1 |
| 2017 | Garden City | 3 | — | 7 | 61 | 8.7 | 0 | 0 | 0 | 0.0 | 0 |
| 2018 | Garden City | 10 | — | 236 | 1,358 | 5.8 | 19 | 3 | 5 | 1.7 | 1 |
| 2019 | Nebraska | 12 | 6 | 143 | 745 | 5.2 | 10 | 15 | 123 | 8.2 | 0 |
| 2020 | Nebraska | 6 | 5 | 84 | 396 | 4.7 | 3 | 12 | 85 | 7.1 | 0 |
| FBS career | | 27 | 18 | 379 | 1,912 | 5.0 | 25 | 29 | 221 | 7.6 | 1 |
| JUCO career | | 13 | — | 243 | 1,419 | 5.8 | 19 | 3 | 5 | 1.7 | 1 |

== Professional career ==
Pre-draft measurables
| Height | Weight | Arm length | Hand span | Wingspan | 40-yard dash | 10-yard split | 20-yard split | 20-yard shuttle | Three-cone drill | Vertical jump | Broad jump | Bench press |
|---|---|---|---|---|---|---|---|---|---|---|---|---|
| 5 ft 9 3/4 in (1.77 m) | 217 lb (98 kg) | 32 in (0.81 m) | 9 1/8 in (0.23 m) | 6 ft 4 1/4 in (1.94 m) | 4.70 s | 1.69 s | 2.73 s | 4.33 s | 7.12 s | 32.0 in (0.81 m) | 9 ft 9 in (2.97 m) | 13 reps |
All values from Pro Day

=== Detroit Lions ===
Mills went undrafted in the 2021 NFL draft and signed with the Detroit Lions but failed to make the team's final roster.

=== Calgary Stampeders ===
Mills signed with the Stampeders in May 2022 prior to the 2022 CFL season, where he would primarily be a back-up. After an injury to Ka’Deem Carey in 2023, Mills became Calgary's primary running back.
