= Deontai Williams Sr. =

American gridiron football player (born 1996)

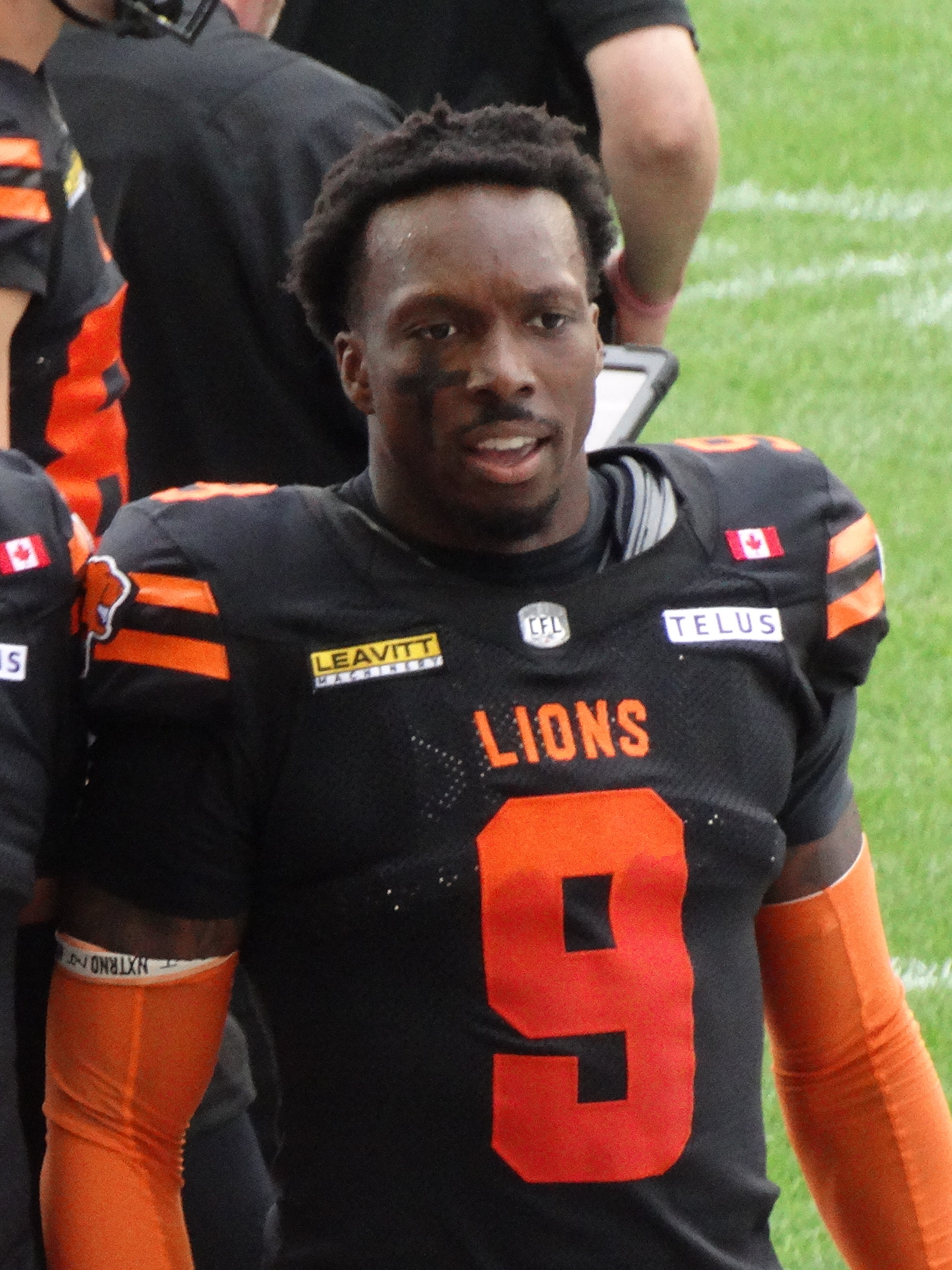
- Williams with the BC Lions in 2025

No. 9 – BC Lions
- Position: Defensive back
- Roster status: Active
- CFL status: American

Personal information
- Born: October 4, 1996 (age 30); Jacksonville, Florida, U.S.
- Listed height: 5 ft 11 in (1.80 m)
- Listed weight: 205 lb (93 kg)

Career information
- High school: Trinity Christian Academy (Jacksonville, FL)
- College: Jones County Junior College; Nebraska
- NFL draft: 2022: undrafted

Career history
- 2022: Seattle Seahawks*
- 2023–2024: Saskatchewan Roughriders
- 2025–present: BC Lions
- * Offseason or practice squad member only

Awards and highlights
- CFL West All-Star (2026)
- Stats at CFL.ca

Deontai Williams Sr. (born October 4, 1996) is an American professional football defensive back for the BC Lions of the Canadian Football League (CFL). He played college football at Jones County Junior College and Nebraska. He has also been a member of the Seattle Seahawks of the National Football League (NFL) and the Saskatchewan Roughriders of the CFL.

== Early life ==
Williams Sr. played high school football at Trinity Christian Academy in Jacksonville, Florida. His father, Roosevelt Williams, was also a football player.

== College career ==
Williams Sr. played college football at Jones County Junior College. He played one game in 2016, recording four tackles and one fumble recovery before suffering a season-ending injury and being redshirted. He appeared in 10 games in 2017, totaling 26 tackles, two interceptions and two forced fumbles.

Williams Sr. transferred to play at Nebraska from 2018 to 2021. He missed most of the 2019 season due to injury. He earned honorable mention All-Big Ten Conference honors in 2020 after accumulating 51 tackles, 1.0 sack, four pass breakups, one forced fumble and one fumble recovery. Williams Sr. recorded 46 tackles, four interceptions and three pass breakups in 2021, garnering honorable mention All-Big Ten recognition.

== Professional career ==
Pre-draft measurables
Height	Weight	Arm length	Hand span	Wingspan	40-yard dash	10-yard split	20-yard split	20-yard shuttle	Three-cone drill	Vertical jump	Broad jump	Bench press
5 ft 11 1/8 in (1.81 m)	203 lb (92 kg)	31 5/8 in (0.80 m)	9 7/8 in (0.25 m)	6 ft 2 7/8 in (1.90 m)	4.59 s	1.66 s	2.59 s	4.01 s	6.78 s	33.0 in (0.84 m)	10 ft 3 in (3.12 m)	14 reps
All values from Pro Day

=== Seattle Seahawks ===
Williams Sr. signed with the Seattle Seahawks of the National Football League (NFL) on May 6, 2022. He was released by the Seahawks on August 30.

=== Saskatchewan Roughriders ===
Williams Sr. was signed by the Saskatchewan Roughriders of the Canadian Football League (CFL) on January 9, 2023. He was moved to the practice roster on June 4, promoted to the active roster on June 15, placed on injured reserve on September 14, and activated from injured reserve on October 6. He played in 14 games, all starts, for the Roughriders in 2023, recording 41 tackles on defense, six special teams tackles and one interception. He became a free agent upon the expiry of his contract on February 11, 2025.

=== BC Lions ===
On February 11, 2025, it was announced that Williams Sr. had signed with the BC Lions. On September 23, 2026, Williams was signed to a two-year contract extension by the Lions, running through the 2028 season. On October 22, 2026, Williams Sr. was placed on the Lions' 1-game injured list. He rejoined the active roster on October 30, 2026, ahead of the Western Semi-Final.
