= Pheldarius Payne =

American football player (born 2000)

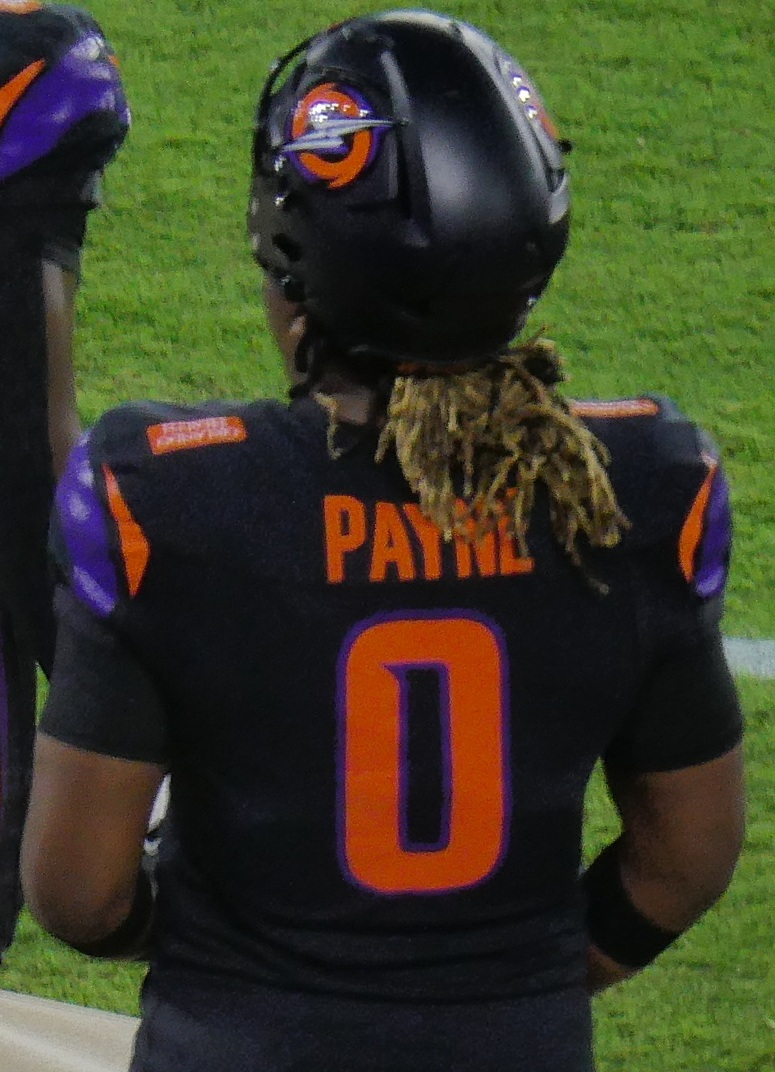
- Payne with the Orlando Storm in 2026

No. 0 – Orlando Storm
- Position: Defensive end
- Roster status: Active

Personal information
- Born: July 14, 2000 (age 26); Suffolk, Virginia, U.S.
- Listed height: 6 ft 2 in (1.88 m)
- Listed weight: 286 lb (130 kg)

Career information
- High school: Nansemond River (Suffolk, Virginia)
- College: Lackawanna (2018–2019); Nebraska (2020–2021); Virginia Tech (2022–2023)
- NFL draft: 2024: undrafted

Career history
- Houston Texans (2024)*; Indianapolis Colts (2024)*; St. Louis Battlehawks (2026)*; Orlando Storm (2026–present)
- * Offseason or practice squad member only
- Stats at Pro Football Reference

Pheldarius Payne (born July 14, 2000) is an American professional football defensive end for the Orlando Storm of the United Football League (UFL). He played college football for the Lackawanna Falcons, Nebraska Cornhuskers, and Virginia Tech Hokies.

== Early life ==
Payne grew up in Suffolk, Virginia, and attended Nansemond River High School. At Nansemond River, he played football and during his senior season was an All-District and All-Region selection. He committed to play college football at Lackawanna College.

== College career ==
=== Lackawanna College ===
Payne spent two seasons at Lackawanna College. He helped Lackawanna advance to the 2019 NJCAA National Championship Game.

Payne committed to NC State before his sophomore season, but flipped his commitment to Nebraska after a visit to their campus.

=== Nebraska ===
During his first season at Nebraska, Payne switched to playing outside linebacker and appeared in every game of the season. During his second season, he appeared in the first ten games before being sidelined by and injury. On February 28, 2022, Payne opted to enter his name into the NCAA transfer portal.

=== Virginia Tech ===
After two seasons at Nebraska, Payne transferred to Virginia Tech. Before the start of the 2022 season, Payne suffered a season-ending Achilles tendon rupture. He returned for the 2023 season and appeared in all 13 games for the Hokies.

== Professional career ==
Pre-draft measurables
Height	Weight	Arm length	Hand span	Wingspan	40-yard dash	10-yard split	20-yard split
6 ft 2 3/8 in (1.89 m)	286 lb (130 kg)	33 in (0.84 m)	9 7/8 in (0.25 m)	6 ft 6 1/2 in (1.99 m)	4.87 s	1.65 s	2.83 s
All values from Pro Day

=== Houston Texans ===
After not being selected in the 2024 NFL draft, Payne signed with the Houston Texans as an undrafted free agent. Payne was also selected by the St. Louis Battlehawks of the UFL during the third round of the 2024 UFL draft, but chose not to sign with them.

He was waived by the Texans with an injury designation on July 17, 2024. On August 12, the Texans re-signed Payne. He was waived on August 27.

=== Indianapolis Colts ===
On December 10, 2024, the Indianapolis Colts signed Payne to their practice squad. He signed a reserve/future contract with Indianapolis on January 6, 2025. On May 9, Payne was waived by the Colts.

=== St. Louis Battlehawks ===
On September 18, 2025, Payne signed with the St. Louis Battlehawks of the United Football League (UFL).

=== Orlando Storm ===
On January 14, 2026, Payne was selected by the Orlando Storm in the 2026 UFL Draft, reuniting him with his previous coach with the Battlehawks, Anthony Becht.

== Personal life ==
Payne is the son of Phelton and Johnnetta Payne. In fifth grade, Payne won a Pop Warner National Championship.
