= Travis Vokolek =

American football player (born 1998)

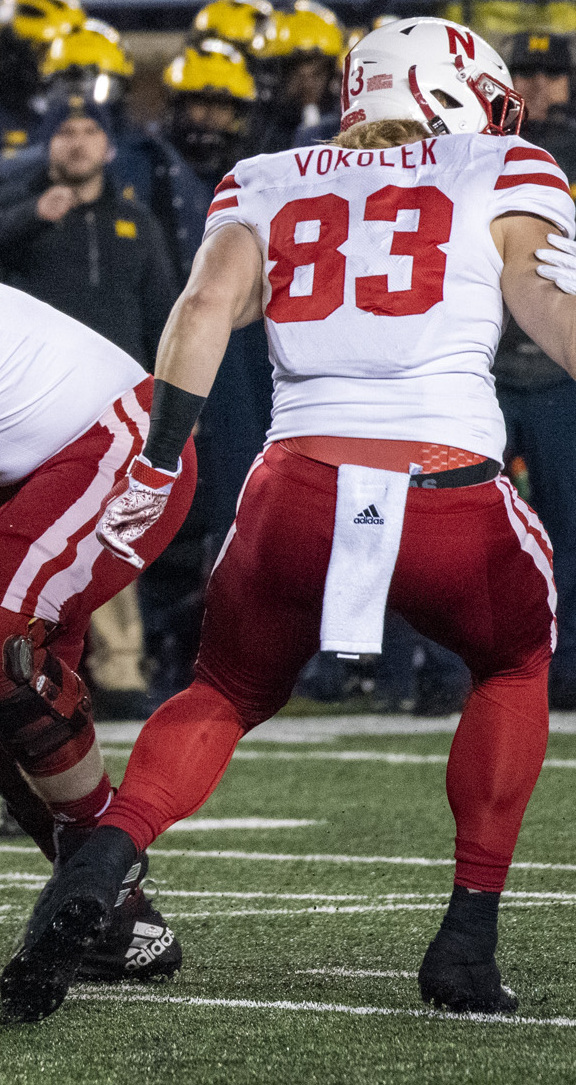

No. 81, 84
- Position: Tight end

Personal information
- Born: June 4, 1998 (age 28); Springfield, Missouri, U.S.
- Listed height: 6 ft 6 in (1.98 m)
- Listed weight: 260 lb (118 kg)

Career information
- High school: Kickapoo (Springfield)
- College: Rutgers (2017–2018); Nebraska (2019–2022)
- NFL draft: 2023: undrafted

Career history
- Baltimore Ravens (2023)*; Arizona Cardinals (2023–2025)
- * Offseason or practice squad member only
- Stats at Pro Football Reference

Travis Vokolek (born June 4, 1998) is an American former professional football player who was a tight end in the National Football League (NFL). He played college football for the Rutgers Scarlet Knights and Nebraska Cornhuskers.

== Early life ==
Vokolek grew up in Springfield, Missouri and attended Kickapoo High School. He was rated a three-star recruit and committed to play college football at Rutgers University.

== College career ==
Vokolek began his college career with the Scarlet Knights. he played in seven games and caught one pass for 14 yards during his freshman season. Vokolek played in all 12 of Rutgers' games with seven starts and had 16 receptions for 184 yards and two touchdowns as a sophomore. He entered the NCAA transfer portal at the end of the regular season.

Vokolek transferred to the University of Nebraska–Lincoln. He sat out the 2019 season and redshirted in accordance with NCAA transfer rules. As a redshirt senior, he had 11 receptions for 127 yards. He decided to utilize the extra year of eligibility granted to college athletes who played in the 2020 season due to the coronavirus pandemic and return to the Cornhuskers for a sixth season. Vokolek caught 20 passes for 240 yards and two touchdowns in his final season.

== Professional career ==
Pre-draft measurables
Height	Weight	Arm length	Hand span	Wingspan	20-yard shuttle	Three-cone drill	Vertical jump	Broad jump	Bench press
6 ft 6 1/8 in (1.98 m)	259 lb (117 kg)	32 7/8 in (0.84 m)	9 1/2 in (0.24 m)	6 ft 7 1/8 in (2.01 m)	4.35 s	7.23 s	31.0 in (0.79 m)	9 ft 7 in (2.92 m)	20 reps
All values from NFL Combine/Pro Day

=== Baltimore Ravens ===
Vokolek was signed by the Baltimore Ravens as an undrafted free agent on April 29, 2023. He was waived by the Ravens as a part of final roster cuts on August 29; he was re-signed to the team's practice squad two days later.

=== Arizona Cardinals ===
On December 20, 2023, Vokolek was signed from the Ravens' practice squad to the Arizona Cardinals' active roster as a replacement for the injured Geoff Swaim. At the 2024 season, Vokolek made the team's initial 53-man roster as the Cardinals' fourth-string tight end behind Trey McBride, Elijah Higgins, and Tip Reiman.

Vokolek reprised his role for the 2025 season, making five appearances (one start) and recording two tackles on special teams. In Week 6 against the Indianapolis Colts, Vokolek suffered a season-ending neck injury after colliding with Colts linebacker Segun Olubi and was placed on injured reserve.

On July 22, 2026, Vokolek announced his retirement from professional football, a forced medical retirement that was a result of his neck injury from the previous season.
