= 2018 Nebraska Cornhuskers football team =

American college football season

2018 Nebraska Cornhuskers football
- Conference: Big Ten Conference
- West Division
- Record: 4–8 (3–6 Big Ten)
- Head coach: Scott Frost (1st season)
- Offensive coordinator: Troy Walters (1st season)
- Offensive scheme: No-huddle spread option
- Defensive coordinator: Erik Chinander (1st season)
- Base defense: 3–4
- Home stadium: Memorial Stadium

2018 Big Ten Conference football standings
	Conf.			Overall
Team	W		L	W		L
East Division
No. 3 Ohio State xy$	8	–	1	13	–	1
No. 14 Michigan x	8	–	1	10	–	3
No. 17 Penn State	6	–	3	9	–	4
Michigan State	5	–	4	7	–	6
Maryland	3	–	6	5	–	7
Indiana	2	–	7	5	–	7
Rutgers	0	–	9	1	–	11
West Division
No. 21 Northwestern xy	8	–	1	9	–	5
Wisconsin	5	–	4	8	–	5
No. 25 Iowa	5	–	4	9	–	4
Purdue	5	–	4	6	–	7
Minnesota	3	–	6	7	–	6
Nebraska	3	–	6	4	–	8
Illinois	2	–	7	4	–	8
Championship: Ohio State 45, Northwestern 24
$ – Conference champion; x – Division champion/co-champions; y – Championship game participant; Rankings from AP Poll

The 2018 Nebraska Cornhuskers football team represented the University of Nebraska–Lincoln in the 2018 NCAA Division I FBS football season. The team was coached by first-year head coach Scott Frost and played their home games at Memorial Stadium in Lincoln, Nebraska. They competed as members of the West Division of the Big Ten Conference.

After Nebraska's season opener against Akron was canceled due to inclement weather, the Cornhuskers began the season with six straight losses, the worst start in program history. This, combined with their four losses at the end of 2017, formed a school-record 10-game losing streak. The team's performance improved in the second half of the season, and the team won four of their last six games to finish at 4–8 overall.

Freshman quarterback Adrian Martinez led the team on offense, finishing with 2,617 passing yards, 17 passing touchdowns, and 8 rushing touchdowns. Senior running back Devine Ozigbo finished with 1,082 rushing yards and 12 touchdowns, becoming the first Nebraska running back to exceed 1,000 rushing yards since Ameer Abdullah in 2014. Senior wide receiver Stanley Morgan Jr. finished with 1,004 receiving yards and was named second-team All-Big Ten. Linebacker Mohamed Barry led the team in tackles.

== Offseason ==
=== Recruiting ===
==== Position key ====
Back	B	Center	C	Cornerback	CB	Defensive back	DB
Defensive end	DE	Defensive lineman	DL	Defensive tackle	DT	End	E
Fullback	FB	Guard	G	Halfback	HB	Kicker	K
Kickoff returner	KR	Offensive tackle	OT	Offensive lineman	OL	Linebacker	LB
Long snapper	LS	Punter	P	Punt returner	PR	Quarterback	QB
Running back	RB	Safety	S	Tight end	TE	Wide receiver	WR

==== Recruits ====
The Cornhuskers signed a total of 12 recruits during the Early Signing Period from December 20–22, 2017.

===== Scholarship recruits =====
College recruiting (2018)
Name	Hometown	School	Height	Weight	Commit date
David Alston; OLB	Woodbury, MN	Woodbury (MN)	6 ft 5 in (1.96 m)	225 lb (102 kg)	Oct 6, 2017
David Alston; OLB	Recruit ratings: Rivals: 247Sports: ESPN: (77)				
Greg Bell; RB	Chula Vista, CA	Chula Vista (CA) Bonita Vista; Arizona Western CC	6 ft 0 in (1.83 m)	190 lb (86 kg)	Dec 20, 2017
Greg Bell; RB	Recruit ratings: Rivals: 247Sports: ESPN: (81)				
Willie Canty; OT	Belle Glade, FL	Belle Glade (FL) Glades Central	6 ft 6 in (1.98 m)	290 lb (130 kg)	Feb 7, 2018
Willie Canty; OT	Recruit ratings: Rivals: 247Sports: ESPN: (76)				
Braxton Clark; CB	Orlando, FL	Orlando (FL) Dr. Phillips	6 ft 3 in (1.91 m)	190 lb (86 kg)	Jan 21, 2018
Braxton Clark; CB	Recruit ratings: Rivals: 247Sports: ESPN: (73)				
Will Farniok; OL	Sioux Falls, SD	Sioux Falls (SD) Washington	6 ft 3 in (1.91 m)	260 lb (120 kg)	Apr 8, 2017
Will Farniok; OL	Recruit ratings: Rivals: 247Sports: ESPN: (79)				
Will Honas; LB	Wichita, KS	Wichita (KS) Bishop Carroll; Butler CC	6 ft 2 in (1.88 m)	215 lb (98 kg)	Dec 21, 2017
Will Honas; LB	Recruit ratings: Rivals: 247Sports: ESPN: (80)				
Andre Hunt; WR	Lancaster, CA	Lancaster (CA) Paraclete	6 ft 1 in (1.85 m)	185 lb (84 kg)	Feb 7, 2018
Andre Hunt; WR	Recruit ratings: Rivals: 247Sports: ESPN: (78)				
Will Jackson; CB	Washington, DC	Washington (DC) St. John's; Kentucky; Mesa CC	6 ft 3 in (1.91 m)	190 lb (86 kg)	Jun 5, 2018
Will Jackson; CB	Recruit ratings: Scout: Rivals: 247Sports:				
Cam'ron Jones; S	Mansfield, TX	Mansfield (TX)	6 ft 0 in (1.83 m)	185 lb (84 kg)	Jan 27, 2018
Cam'ron Jones; S	Recruit ratings: Rivals: 247Sports: ESPN: (80)				
Miles Jones; ATH	Plantation, FL	Plantation (FL) American Heritage	5 ft 8 in (1.73 m)	165 lb (75 kg)	Jan 18, 2018
Miles Jones; ATH	Recruit ratings: Rivals: 247Sports: ESPN: (76)				
Cam Jurgens; TE	Beatrice, NE	Beatrice (NE)	6 ft 4 in (1.93 m)	240 lb (110 kg)	Aug 6, 2015
Cam Jurgens; TE	Recruit ratings: Rivals: 247Sports: ESPN: (81)				
Katerian Legrone; WR	Atlanta, GA	Atlanta (GA) B.E.S.T.	6 ft 2 in (1.88 m)	235 lb (107 kg)	Dec 20, 2017
Katerian Legrone; WR	Recruit ratings: Rivals: 247Sports: ESPN: (76)				
Adrian Martinez; QB	Fresno, CA	Fresno (CA) Clovis West	6 ft 2 in (1.88 m)	200 lb (91 kg)	Dec 13, 2017
Adrian Martinez; QB	Recruit ratings: Rivals: 247Sports: ESPN: (84)				
Justin McGriff; WR	Tampa, FL	Tampa (FL) Jefferson	6 ft 6 in (1.98 m)	220 lb (100 kg)	Dec 11, 2017
Justin McGriff; WR	Recruit ratings: Rivals: 247Sports: ESPN: (75)				
Barret Pickering; K	Hoover, AL	Hoover (AL)	6 ft 0 in (1.83 m)	175 lb (79 kg)	May 2, 2017
Barret Pickering; K	Recruit ratings: Rivals: 247Sports: ESPN: (76)				
Casey Rogers; DE	Avon, CT	Avon (CT) Old Farms	6 ft 5 in (1.96 m)	250 lb (110 kg)	Jan 16, 2018
Casey Rogers; DE	Recruit ratings: Rivals: 247Sports: ESPN: (76)				
C.J. Smith; S	West Palm Beach, FL	West Palm Beach (FL) Oxbridge	6 ft 3 in (1.91 m)	190 lb (86 kg)	Dec 10, 2017
C.J. Smith; S	Recruit ratings: Rivals: 247Sports: ESPN: (81)				
Caleb Tannor; DE	Lithonia, GA	DeKalb County (GA) Miller Grove	6 ft 4 in (1.93 m)	200 lb (91 kg)	Feb 7, 2018
Caleb Tannor; DE	Recruit ratings: Rivals: 247Sports: ESPN: (80)				
Cam Taylor-Britt; CB	Montgomery, AL	Montgomery (AL) Park Crossing	5 ft 11 in (1.80 m)	200 lb (91 kg)	Feb 7, 2018
Cam Taylor-Britt; CB	Recruit ratings: Rivals: 247Sports: ESPN: (80)				
Maurice Washington; RB	Cedar Hill, TX	Cedar Hill (TX) Trinity Christian	6 ft 0 in (1.83 m)	190 lb (86 kg)	Feb 7, 2018
Maurice Washington; RB	Recruit ratings: Rivals: 247Sports: ESPN: (84)				
Dominick Watt; WR	Miramar, FL	Miramar (FL)	6 ft 2 in (1.88 m)	200 lb (91 kg)	Jan 18, 2018
Dominick Watt; WR	Recruit ratings: Rivals: 247Sports: ESPN: (79)				
Tate Wildeman; DE	Parker, CO	Parker (CO) Legend	6 ft 6 in (1.98 m)	245 lb (111 kg)	Apr 16, 2017
Tate Wildeman; DE	Recruit ratings: Scout: Rivals: 247Sports: ESPN: (79)				
Deontai Williams; CB	Jacksonville, FL	Jacksonville (FL) Trinity Christian; Jones County JC	6 ft 0 in (1.83 m)	175 lb (79 kg)	Dec 17, 2017
Deontai Williams; CB	Recruit ratings: Rivals: 247Sports: ESPN: (80)				
Mike Williams; WR	Lake City, FL	Lake City (FL) Columbia; Georgia Southern; East Mississippi CC	5 ft 10 in (1.78 m)	175 lb (79 kg)	Jan 10, 2018
Mike Williams; WR	Recruit ratings: Rivals: 247Sports: ESPN: (77)				
Jaron Woodyard; WR	Gaithersburg, MD	Gaithersburg (MD) Avalon; Arizona Western CC	5 ft 11 in (1.80 m)	175 lb (79 kg)	Dec 10, 2017
Jaron Woodyard; WR	Recruit ratings: Rivals: 247Sports: ESPN: (82)				
Overall recruit ranking: Rivals: 21 247Sports: 22 ESPN: 22
Note: In many cases, Scout, Rivals, 247Sports, On3, and ESPN may conflict in their listings of height and weight.; In these cases, the average was taken. ESPN grades are on a 100-point scale.; Sources: "Nebraska Football Commitments". Rivals.; "ESPN". ESPN.; "2018 Team Ranking". Rivals.com.

===== Walk-on recruits =====
College recruiting (2018)
Name	Hometown	School	Height	Weight	Commit date
Jake Archer; LB	Omaha, NE	Omaha (NE) Skutt	6 ft 1 in (1.85 m)	200 lb (91 kg)	Dec 14, 2017
Jake Archer; LB	Recruit ratings: Rivals: 247Sports: ESPN:				
Mitchell Balenger; OL	Leonardtown, MD	Leonardtown (MD); Fork Union (VA) Military	6 ft 3 in (1.91 m)	307 lb (139 kg)	Jul 6, 2018
Mitchell Balenger; OL	Recruit ratings: Rivals: 247Sports: ESPN:				
Anthony Banderas; LB	Lincoln, NE	Lincoln (NE) Southwest	6 ft 1 in (1.85 m)	215 lb (98 kg)	Jan 16, 2018
Anthony Banderas; LB	Recruit ratings: Rivals: 247Sports: ESPN:				
Brody Belt; RB	Omaha, NE	Omaha (NE) Millard West	5 ft 10 in (1.78 m)	170 lb (77 kg)	Dec 14, 2017
Brody Belt; RB	Recruit ratings: Rivals: 247Sports: ESPN:				
Moses Bryant; RB	Omaha, NE	Omaha (NE) Elkhorn South	5 ft 11 in (1.80 m)	195 lb (88 kg)	Feb 5, 2018
Moses Bryant; RB	Recruit ratings: Rivals: 247Sports: ESPN:				
Chris Cassidy; FB/LB	Lincoln, NE	Lincoln (NE) Pius X	6 ft 1 in (1.85 m)	220 lb (100 kg)	Dec 14, 2017
Chris Cassidy; FB/LB	Recruit ratings: Rivals: 247Sports: ESPN:				
Colton Feist; DE	Yutan, NE	Yutan (NE)	6 ft 3 in (1.91 m)	235 lb (107 kg)	Dec 18, 2017
Colton Feist; DE	Recruit ratings: Rivals: 247Sports: ESPN:				
Bennett Folkers; WR	Gothenburg, NE	Gothenburg (NE)	6 ft 3 in (1.91 m)	180 lb (82 kg)	Feb 4, 2017
Bennett Folkers; WR	Recruit ratings: Rivals: 247Sports: ESPN:				
AJ Forbes; OL	Omaha, NE	Bellevue (NE) West	6 ft 3 in (1.91 m)	275 lb (125 kg)	Dec 14, 2017
AJ Forbes; OL	Recruit ratings: Rivals: 247Sports: ESPN:				
Corbin Frederick; S	Mansfield, TX	Mansfield (TX)	5 ft 10 in (1.78 m)	188 lb (85 kg)	Jan 30, 2017
Corbin Frederick; S	Recruit ratings: Rivals: 247Sports: ESPN:				
Justin Holm; ATH	Lincoln, NE	Lincoln (NE) Southwest	6 ft 6 in (1.98 m)	190 lb (86 kg)	Jun 24, 2017
Justin Holm; ATH	Recruit ratings: Rivals: 247Sports: ESPN:				
Joseph Johnson; LB	Gretna, NE	Gretna (NE)	6 ft 3 in (1.91 m)	230 lb (100 kg)	Dec 18, 2017
Joseph Johnson; LB	Recruit ratings: Rivals: 247Sports: ESPN:				
Bryson Krull; WR	North Platte, NE	North Platte (NE)	6 ft 5 in (1.96 m)	220 lb (100 kg)	Dec 15, 2017
Bryson Krull; WR	Recruit ratings: Rivals: 247Sports: ESPN:				
Wyatt Liewer; WR	O'Neill, NE	O'Neill (NE)	6 ft 3 in (1.91 m)	165 lb (75 kg)	Dec 13, 2017
Wyatt Liewer; WR	Recruit ratings: Rivals: 247Sports: ESPN:				
Matt Masker; QB	Kearney, NE	Kearney (NE) Catholic	6 ft 3 in (1.91 m)	215 lb (98 kg)	Dec 17, 2017
Matt Masker; QB	Recruit ratings: Rivals: 247Sports: ESPN:				
Cade Mueller; LS	Gretna, NE	Gretna (NE)	6 ft 1 in (1.85 m)	225 lb (102 kg)	Feb 6, 2018
Cade Mueller; LS	Recruit ratings: Rivals: 247Sports: ESPN:				
Simon Otte; RB/LB	York, NE	York (NE)	6 ft 2 in (1.88 m)	180 lb (82 kg)	Feb 4, 2018
Simon Otte; RB/LB	Recruit ratings: Rivals: 247Sports: ESPN:				
Cameron Pieper; LS	Lincoln, NE	Lincoln (NE) Southwest	6 ft 4 in (1.93 m)	220 lb (100 kg)	Oct 14, 2017
Cameron Pieper; LS	Recruit ratings: Rivals: 247Sports: ESPN:				
Connor Ruth; FB	Malcolm, NE	Seward (NE)	6 ft 0 in (1.83 m)	215 lb (98 kg)	Jun 13, 2018
Connor Ruth; FB	Recruit ratings: Rivals: 247Sports: ESPN:				
Ryan Schommer; DE	Norfolk, NE	Norfolk (NE)	6 ft 5 in (1.96 m)	235 lb (107 kg)	Dec 21, 2017
Ryan Schommer; DE	Recruit ratings: Rivals: 247Sports: ESPN:				
Collin Shefke; OL	Lincoln, NE	Lincoln (NE) Southwest	6 ft 5 in (1.96 m)	280 lb (130 kg)	Dec 13, 2017
Collin Shefke; OL	Recruit ratings: Rivals: 247Sports: ESPN:				
Isaiah Stalbird; S	Kearney, NE	Kearney (NE)	6 ft 1 in (1.85 m)	195 lb (88 kg)	Jan 24, 2018
Isaiah Stalbird; S	Recruit ratings: Rivals: 247Sports: ESPN:				
Andrew Thurman; WR	Stilwell, KS	Overland Park (KS) Blue Valley West	6 ft 4 in (1.93 m)	195 lb (88 kg)	Apr 21, 2018
Andrew Thurman; WR	Recruit ratings: Rivals: 247Sports: ESPN:				
Overall recruit ranking:
Note: In many cases, Scout, Rivals, 247Sports, On3, and ESPN may conflict in their listings of height and weight.; In these cases, the average was taken. ESPN grades are on a 100-point scale.; Sources: "2017 Team Ranking". Rivals.com.

=== Transfers ===
==== Outgoing ====
Name	No.	Pos.	Height	Weight	Year	Hometown	New school
Patrick O'Brien	#12	QB	6'4"	230	Sophomore	San Juan Capistrano, CA	Colorado State
Ben Miles	#29	FB	6'1"	210	RS Freshman	Baton Rouge, LA	Texas A&M
Bryan Brokop	#61	OL	6'5"	295	Sophomore	New Lenox, IL	TBD
Keyan Williams	#09	WR	5'10"	195	Senior	New Orleans, LA	Ball State
Andrew Ward	#52	LB	6'1"	200	RS Freshman	Muskegon, MI	Central Michigan
Sean Lambert	#24	RB	5'11"	225	RS Freshman (walk-on)	Fremont, NE	Midland
Willie Hampton	#33	LB	6'1"	225	RS Freshman	Plantation, FL	TBD
Will Jackson	#33	DB	6'3"	200	Junior	Washington, DC	TBD
Jalin Barnett	#74	OL	6'4"	310	Junior	Lawton, OK	N/A
Avery Roberts	#14	LB	6'1"	230	Sophomore	Wilmington, DE	Oregon State
Tristan Gebbia	#14	QB	6'3"	185	RS Freshman	Calabasas, CA	Oregon State

==== Incoming ====
Name	No.	Pos.	Height	Weight	Year	Hometown	Prev. school
Tre Neal	#14	S	6'1"	200	Senior (graduate transfer)	Atlanta, GA	Central Florida
Vaha Vainuku	#11	DT	6'3"	295	Junior (graduate transfer)	Salt Lake City, UT	Utah
Alec Cromer	#95	QB/P	6'5"	225	Sophomore (Walk-on)	Beatrice, NE	South Dakota State
Breon Dixon	#34	DB	5'11"	206	Sophomore	Loganville, GA	Mississippi
Noah Vedral	#16	QB	6'2"	190	Sophomore (Walk-on)	Wahoo, NE	Central Florida
Lane McCallum	#48	S/K	6'2"	205	RS Freshman (Walk-on)	Norfolk, NE	Air Force
Corbin Ruth	#46	DB	6'0"	180	RS Freshman (Walk-on)	Malcolm, NE	Northwest Missouri State

=== Spring scrimmage ===
2018 Red—White Spring Game

Team	1	2	3	4	Total
White	6	3	0	0	9
• Red	7	21	7	14	49

- Date: April 21, 2018
- Location: Memorial Stadium, Lincoln, NE
- Game start: 11:00 a.m.
- Elapsed time: 2 hrs, 5 min
- Game attendance: 86,818
- Game weather: 48°F, WSW 4mph, Overcast-Light Rain
- Referee: Ron Snodgrass
- TV announcers (BTN): Kevin Kugler, Damon Benning, Ameer Abdullah

Scoring summary
1	5:33	White	Rafdal 24 yard pass from Bunch (Frahm kick no good)	White 6–0
1	2:21	Red	Martinez 15 yard rush (Pickering kick good)	Red 7–6
2	8:01	White	Frahm 30-yard field goal	White 9–7
2	4:55	Red	McQuitty 25 yard pass from Martinez (Pickering kick good)	Red 14–9
2	2:41	Red	M. Williams 3 yard pass from Gebbia (Pickering kick good)	Red 21–9
2	1:25	Red	Martinez 6 yard rush (Pickering kick good)	Red 28–9
3	4:27	Red	Mazour 43 yard rush (Pickering kick good)	Red 35–9
4	12:12	Red	Martinez 23 yard rush (Pickering kick good)	Red 42–9
4	6:46	Red	Kade Warner 57 yard pass from Martinez (Pickering kick good)	Red 49–9

== Preseason ==
=== Award watch lists ===
Award	Player	Position	Year
Lott Trophy	Dedrick Young	LB	SR
Fred Biletnikoff Award	Stanley Morgan Jr.	WR	SR
Fred Biletnikoff Award	JD Spielman	WR	SO
John Mackey Award	Jack Stoll	TE	SO
Ray Guy Award	Caleb Lightbourn	P	JR
Paul Hornung Award	JD Spielman	WR/KR	SO
Earl Campbell Tyler Rose Award	Devine Ozigbo	RB	SR

== Schedule ==
The 2018 schedule consisted of seven home and five away games in the regular season. Nebraska hosted conference foes Purdue, Minnesota, Illinois, and Michigan State and the Cornhuskers traveled to play Michigan, Wisconsin, Northwestern, Ohio State, and Iowa in Big Ten play.

Date	Time	Opponent	Site	TV	Result	Attendance
September 8	2:30 p.m.	Colorado*	Memorial Stadium; Lincoln, NE (rivalry)	ABC	L 28–33	89,853
September 15	11:00 a.m.	Troy*	Memorial Stadium; Lincoln, NE	BTN	L 19–24	89,360
September 22	11:00 a.m.	at No. 19 Michigan	Michigan Stadium; Ann Arbor, MI	FS1	L 10–56	111,037
September 29	2:30 p.m.	Purdue^{†}	Memorial Stadium; Lincoln, NE	BTN	L 28–42	88,911
October 6	6:30 p.m.	at No. 16 Wisconsin	Camp Randall Stadium; Madison, WI (Freedom Trophy)	BTN	L 24–41	80,051
October 13	11:00 a.m.	at Northwestern	Ryan Field; Evanston, IL	ABC	L 31–34 ^{OT}	47,330
October 20	2:30 p.m.	Minnesota	Memorial Stadium; Lincoln, NE	BTN	W 53–28	89,272
October 27^{[a]}	11:00 a.m.	Bethune–Cookman*	Memorial Stadium; Lincoln, NE	BTN	W 45–9	88,735
November 3	11:00 a.m.	at No. 8 Ohio State	Ohio Stadium; Columbus, OH	FOX	L 31–36	104,245
November 10	11:00 a.m.	Illinois	Memorial Stadium; Lincoln, NE	BTN	W 54–35	88,316
November 17	11:00 a.m.	Michigan State	Memorial Stadium; Lincoln, NE	FOX	W 9–6	88,793
November 23	11:00 a.m.	at Iowa	Kinnick Stadium; Iowa City, IA (Heroes Game)	FOX	L 28–31	65,299
*Non-conference game; ^{†}Homecoming; Rankings from AP Poll released prior to game; All times are in Central time

^{^[a]}The game between Nebraska and Akron, originally scheduled for September 1, 2018, was canceled due to inclement weather. Nebraska finalized an agreement to play Bethune–Cookman on October 27 at Memorial Stadium to fill an opening on the schedule that replaced the Huskers’ September 1 game against Akron.

== Roster and coaching staff ==
2018 Nebraska Cornhuskers football team roster
Players
Coaches
Offense

Pos.	#	Name	Class
WR	42	Chad Alioth Jr.	RFr
TE	11	Austin Allen	RFr
OL	61	Mitchell Balenger	Fr
OL	73	Broc Bando	RFr
WR	36	Christian Banker	RFr
RB	25	Greg Bell	Jr
RB	38	Brody Belt	Fr
RB	33	Jaylin Bradley	So
QB	17	Andrew Bunch	So
WR	45	Ty Chaffin	So
OL	62	Cole Conrad	Sr
OL	63	Tanner Farmer	Sr
OL	71	Matt Farniok	So
OL	68	Will Farniok	Fr
WR	29	Bennett Folkers	Fr
OL	52	AJ Forbes	Fr
OL	67	Jerald Foster (C)	Sr
OL	65	Christian Gaylord	Jr
RB	49	Austin Hemphill	Jr
TE	31	Keaton Henry	So
OL	75	Trent Hixson	RFr
TE	47	Branden Hohenstein	So
WR	41	Justin Holm	Fr
WR	89	Todd Honas	So
WR	15	Andre Hunt	Fr
OL	76	Brenden Jaimes	So
WR	26	Miles Jones	Fr
TE	44	Cam Jurgens	Fr
TE	30	Bo Kitrell	Sr
TE	48	Bryson Krull	Fr
TE	32	Katerian Legrone	Fr
WR	30	Wyatt Liewer	Fr
WR	1	Tyjon Lindsey	So
QB	2	Adrian Martinez	Fr
QB	11	Matt Masker	Fr
RB	37	Wyatt Mazour	Jr
WR	13	Justin McGriff	Fr
WR	4	Jaevon McQuitty	RFr
OL	66	Hunter Miller	RFr
WR	8	Stanley Morgan Jr. (C)	Sr
RB	22	Devine Ozigbo	Sr
TE	82	Kurt Rafdal	RFr
OL	50	John Raridon	So
WR	83	Bryan Reimers	Sr
WR	40	Brandon Robbins	RFr
RB	23	Austin Rose	Sr
RB	43	Connor Ruth	Fr
OL	56	Collin Shefke	Fr
OL	70	Matt Sichterman	RFr
WR	10	JD Spielman	So
TE	86	Jack Stoll	So
WR	39	Andrew Thurman	RFr
QB	16	Noah Vedral	So
WR	81	Kade Warner	RFr
RB	28	Maurice Washington	Fr
RB	21	Mikale Wilbon	Sr
WR	19	Mike Williams	Jr
OL	56	Boe Wilson	So
WR	88	Jaron Woodyard	Jr
WR	87	Conor Young	Jr

Defense

Pos.	#	Name	Class
DL	91	Freedom Akinmoladun	Sr
OLB	30	Quayshon Alexander	So
OLB	45	David Alston	Fr
DB	4	Avery Anderson	Jr
DL	75	Fyn Anderson	Jr
LB	50	Jake Archer	Fr
LB	51	Anthony Banderas	Fr
ILB	7	Mohamed Barry	Jr
CB	23	Dicaprio Bootle	So
DB	35	Moses Bryant	Fr
DB	39	Bradley Bunner	RFr
CB	2	Tony Butler	So
LB	58	Chris Cassidy	Fr
CB	15	Braxton Clark	Fr
DB	16	Ethan Cox	RFr
DL	93	Damion Daniels	RFr
OLB	22	Alex Davis	Jr
DL	96	Carlos Davis	Jr
DL	94	Khalil Davis	Jr
S	19	Marquel Dismuke	So
OLB	34	Breon Dixon	So
OLB	13	JoJo Domann	So
DL	82	Colton Feist	Fr
OLB	43	Tyrin Ferguson	Jr
DB	37	Corbin Frederick	Fr
OLB	12	Luke Gifford (C)	Sr
ILB	3	Will Honas (injured)	Jr
DL	38	Damian Jackson	RFr
CB	21	Lamar Jackson	Jr
DL	47	Matt Jarzynka	Sr
OLB	32	Pernell Jefferson	So
LB	53	Joseph Johnson	Fr
DB	29	Cam'ron Jones	Fr
ILB	40	Grant Jordan	So
ILB	36	Spencer Jordan	So
S	36	Reid Karel	Jr
CB	6	Eric Lee Jr.	Jr
DL	90	Ben Lingenfelter	RFr
DB	48	Lane McCallum (I)	RFr
ILB	31	Collin Miller	So
DL	9	DaiShon Neal	Jr
S	14	Tre Neal	Sr
DL	99	Peyton Newell	Sr
LB	34	Simon Otte	Fr
OLB	55	Jordan Paup	RFr
S	25	Antonio Reed	Sr
DL	98	Casey Rogers	Fr
DB	46	Corbin Ruth (I)	RFr
DL	54	Ryan Schommer	Fr
S	26	CJ Smith	Fr
DB	49	Isaiah Stalbird	Fr
DL	95	Ben Stille	So
DL	44	Mick Stoltenberg (C)	Sr
DB	42	Jeramiah Stovall	Jr
DB	28	Eli Sullivan	So
OLB	4	Caleb Tannor	Fr
CB	17	Cam Taylor-Britt	Fr
DL	97	Deontre Thomas	So
OLB	18	Guy Thomas	RFr
DL	11	Vaha Vainuku	Jr
DL	55	Chris Walker	RFr
ILB	57	Jacob Weinmaster	Jr
DL	92	Tate Wildeman	Fr
S	24	Aaron Williams	Sr
S	41	Deontai Williams	So
ILB	5	Dedrick Young II	Sr

Special teams

Pos.	#	Name	Class
P	98	Isaac Armstrong	Jr
P	95	Alec Cromer (I)	So
PK	39	Cole Frahm	RFr
P	35	Caleb Lightbourn	Jr
LS	84	Jordan Ober	Sr
PK	32	Barret Pickering	Fr
LS	91	Cameron Pieper	Fr
LS	92	Chase Urbach	Jr
P	90	Jackson Walker	Jr

Head coach

- Scott Frost
  3rd season as HC
  1st year at Nebraska
  Alma mater: Nebraska

Coordinators/assistant coaches

- Erik Chinander
  3rd season as DC
  1st year at Nebraska
  Alma mater: Iowa
- Troy Walters
  10th season as WR coach, 4th as OC
  1st year at Nebraska
  Alma mater: Stanford
- Greg Austin
  6th season as OL coach
  1st year at Nebraska
  Alma mater: Nebraska
- Sean Beckton
  3rd season as TE coach
  1st year at Nebraska
  Alma mater: Central Florida
- Mike Dawson
  6th season as DL coach
  1st year at Nebraska
  Alma mater: Massachusetts-Amherst
- Jovan Dewitt
  10th season as OLB coach, 6th as ST coach
  1st year at Nebraska
  Alma mater: Northern Michigan
- Travis Fisher
  7th season as DB coach
  1st year at Nebraska
  Alma mater: Central Florida
- Ryan Held
  3rd season as RB coach
  1st year at Nebraska
  Alma mater: Nebraska
- Barrett Ruud
  1st season as ILB coach
  1st year at Nebraska
  Alma mater: Nebraska
- Mario Verduzco
  26th season as QB coach
  1st year at Nebraska
  Alma mater: San Jose St.

Legend

- (C) Team captain
- (S) Suspended
- (I) Ineligible
- Injured
- Redshirt

Roster
Last update: August 3, 2018

=== Depth chart ===
Defense

FS
Aaron Williams
Antonio Reed
Marquel Dismuke
⋅

OLB	ILB	ILB	OLB
Tyrin Ferguson; Alex Davis	Mohamed Barry	Dedrick Young	Luke Gifford
JoJo Domann	Jacob Weinmaster	Collin Miller	Caleb Tannor
⋅	⋅	⋅	⋅

SS
Tre Neal
Deontai Williams
⋅

CB
Lamar Jackson
Eric Lee
Braxton Clark

DE	NT	DE
Freedom Akinmoladun	Mick Stoltenberg (injured); Carlos Davis	Ben Stille
Khalil Davis	Damion Daniels	Carlos Davis
⋅	Peyton Newell	⋅

CB
Dicaprio Bootle
Cam Taylor-Britt
⋅

Offense

WR
Stanley Morgan Jr.
Bryan Reimers
⋅

WR
Kade Warner
Mike Williams
Jaevon Mcquitty
⋅

LT	LG	C	RG	RT
Brenden Jaimes	Jerald Foster	Tanner Farmer	Boe Wilson	Matt Farniok
Christian Gaylord	John Raridon	Cole Conrad	Trent Hixson	Matt Sichterman
⋅	⋅	⋅	⋅	⋅

TE
Jack Stoll
Austin Allen
Kurt Rafdel

WR
JD Spielman
Jaron Woodyard
⋅

QB
Adrian Martinez
Andrew Bunch
⋅

RB
Devine Ozigbo
Maurice Washington
Wyatt Mazour

Special teams
PK Barrett Pickering
P Caleb Lightbourn
Issac Armstrong
KR Maurice Washington
PR JD Spielman
LS Jordan Ober

== Game summaries ==
=== Colorado ===
Colorado at Nebraska

Team	1	2	3	4	Total
• Colorado	14	3	10	6	33
Nebraska	7	14	7	0	28

- Date: September 8
- Location: Memorial Stadium
  Lincoln, NE
- Game start: 2:36 p.m. CDT
- Elapsed time: 3:41
- Game attendance: 89,853
- Game weather: Overcast, 70 degrees, Wind ENE @ 11 mph
- Referee: Steve Strimling
- TV announcers (ABC): Bob Wischusen, Brock Huard, Allison Williams

Scoring summary
1	9:00	Colorado	Jay MacIntyre 3 yard pass from Steven Montez )James Stefanou kick)	Colorado 7–0
1	6:47	Colorado	Lavis Shenault 3 yard run (Sawyer Williams kick)	Colorado 14–0
1	3:47	Nebraska	Adrian Martinez 41 yard run (Barret Pickering kick)	Colorado 14–7
2	10:15	Nebraska	Devine Ozigbo 8 yard run (Barret Pickering kick)	14–14
2	2:24	Nebraska	Adrian Martinez 3 yard run (Barret Pickering kick)	Nebraska 21–14
2	0:28	Colorado	James Stefanou 40 yard field goal	Nebraska 21–17
3	10:59	Colorado	James Stefanou 35 yard field goal	Nebraska 21–20
3	5:35	Nebraska	JD Spielman 57 yard pass from Adrian Martinez (Barret Pickering kick)	Nebraska 28–20
3	1:24	Colorado	Jay MacIntyre 8 yard pass from Steven Montez (James Stefanou kick)	Nebraska 28–27
4	1:06	Colorado	Lavis Shenault 40 yard pass from Steven Montez (2 pt PAT failed)	Colorado 33–28

Colorado Game starters

Position	Player
Quarterback	Adrian Martinez
Running Back	Greg Bell
Wide Receiver	Stanley Morgan Jr.
Wide Receiver	Mike Williams
Wide Receiver	JD Speilman
Tight End	Jack Stoll
Left Tackle	Brenden Jaimes
Left Guard	Jerald Foster
Center	Cole Conrad
Right Guard	Tanner Farmer
Right Tackle	Matt Farniok

Position	Player
Defensive End	Ben Stille
Nose Tackle	Mick Stoltenberg
Defensive End	Freedom Akinmoladun
Outside Linebacker	Luke Gifford
Inside Linebacker	Dedrick Young
Inside Linebacker	Mohamed Barry
Outside Linebacker	Tyrin Ferguson
Cornerback	Dicaprio Bootle
Strong Safety	Tre Neal
Free Safety	Aaron Williams/Antonio Reed
Cornerback	Lamar Jackson

=== Troy ===
Troy at Nebraska

Team	1	2	3	4	Total
• Troy	3	14	0	7	24
Nebraska	0	7	6	6	19

- Date: September 15
- Location: Memorial Stadium
  Lincoln, NE
- Game start: 11:00 a.m. CDT
- Elapsed time: 3:16
- Game attendance: 89,360
- Game weather: 84 degrees, Sunny, Wind S @ 9 mph
- Referee: Jerry McGinn
- TV announcers (BTN): Joe Beninati, James Laurinaitis, Damon Benning

Scoring summary
1	7:24	Troy	Tyler Sumpter 37 yard field goal	Troy 3–0
2	12:17	Troy	Cedarius Rookard 58 yard punt return (Tyler Sumpter kick)	Troy 10–0
2	5:12	Troy	B.J. Smith 9 yard run (Tyler Sumpter kick)	Troy 17–0
2	3:02	Nebraska	Stanley Morgan Jr. 9 yard pass from Andrew Bunch (Barret Pickering kick)	Troy 17–7
3	10:25	Nebraska	Barret Pickering 23 yard field goal	Troy 17–10
3	3:02	Nebraska	Barret Pickering 32 yard field goal	Troy 17–13
4	6:45	Troy	B.J. Smith 26 yard run (Tyler Sumpter kick)	Troy 24–13
4	2:55	Nebraska	JD Spielman 7 yard pass from Andrew Bunch (2 point PAT failed)	Troy 24–19

Troy Game starters

Position	Player
Quarterback	Andrew Bunch
Running Back	Greg Bell
Wide Receiver	Stanley Morgan Jr.
Wide Receiver	Bryan Reimers
Wide Receiver	JD Speilman
Tight End	Jack Stoll
Left Tackle	Brenden Jaimes
Left Guard	Jerlad Foster
Center	Cole Conrad
Right Guard	Tanner Farmer
Right Tackle	Matt Farniok

Position	Player
Defensive End	Ben Stille
Nose Tackle	Mick Stoltenberg
Defensive End	Freedom Akinmoladun
Outside Linebacker	Luke Gifford
Inside Linebacker	Dedrick Young
Inside Linebacker	Mohamed Barry
Outside Linebacker	Tyrin Ferguson
Cornerback	Dicaprio Bootle
Strong Safety	Tre Neal
Free Safety	Aaron Williams/Antonio Reed
Cornerback	Lamar Jackson

=== At Michigan ===
Nebraska at Michigan

Team	1	2	3	4	Total
Nebraska	0	0	3	7	10
• No. 19 Michigan	20	19	10	7	56

- Date: September 22
- Location: Michigan Stadium
  Ann Arbor, MI
- Game start: 11:00 a.m. CDT
- Elapsed time: 3:30
- Game attendance: 111,037
- Game weather: Partly Cloudy, 63 degrees, Wind NE @ 5–10 mph
- Referee: John O'Neill
- TV announcers (FS1): Tim Brando, Spencer Tillman, Holly Sonders

Scoring summary
1	10:27	Michigan	Ben Mason 1 yard run (Quinn Nordin kick)	Michigan 7–0
1	8:58	Michigan	Karan Higdon 44 yard run (Quinn Nordin kick)	Michigan 14–0
1	3:09	Michigan	Ben Mason 4 yard run (PAT failed)	Michigan 20–0
2	14:11	Michigan	Quinn Nordin 50 yard field goal	Michigan 23–0
2	8:20	Michigan	Zach Gentry 5 yard pass from Shea Patterson (Quinn Nordin kick)	Michigan 30–0
2	5:25	Michigan	Ben Mason 1 yard run (Quinn Nordin kick)	Michigan 37–0
2	4:03	Michigan	Safety	Michigan 39–0
3	9:01	Michigan	Donovan Peoples-Jones 60 yard punt return (Quinn Nordin kick)	Michigan 46–0
3	5:23	Nebraska	Barret Pickering 35 yard field goal	Michigan 46–3
3	0:58	Michigan	Quinn Nordin 38 yard field goal	Michigan 49–3
4	14:21	Michigan	Ronnie Bell 56 yard pass from Christian McCaffrey (Quinn Nordin kick)	Michigan 56–3
4	4:14	Nebraska	Wyatt Mazour 3 yard run (Barret Pickering kick)	Michigan 56–10

Michigan Game starters

Position	Player
Quarterback	Adrian Martinez
Running Back	Greg Bell
Wide Receiver	Stanley Morgan Jr.
Wide Receiver	Mike Williams
Wide Receiver	JD Speilman
Tight End	Jack Stoll
Left Tackle	Brenden Jaimes
Left Guard	Jerald Foster
Center	Cole Conrad
Right Guard	Tanner Farmer
Right Tackle	Matt Farniok

Position	Player
Defensive End	Ben Stille
Nose Tackle	Mick Stoltenberg
Defensive End	Freedom Akinmoladun
Outside Linebacker	Luke Gifford
Inside Linebacker	Dedrick Young
Inside Linebacker	Mohamed Barry
Outside Linebacker	Tyrin Ferguson
Cornerback	Dicaprio Bootle
Strong Safety	Tre Neal
Free Safety	Aaron Williams/Antonio Reed
Cornerback	Lamar Jackson

=== Purdue ===
Purdue at Nebraska

Team	1	2	3	4	Total
• Purdue	10	10	15	7	42
Nebraska	7	0	14	7	28

- Date: September 29
- Location: Memorial Stadium
  Lincoln, NE
- Game start: 2:30 p.m. CDT
- Elapsed time: 3:42
- Game attendance: 88,911
- Game weather: Overcast, 49 degrees, Wind SE @ 9 mph
- Referee: Ron Snodgrass
- TV announcers (BTN): Kevin Kugler, Matt Millen, Lisa Byington

Scoring summary
1	11:20	Nebraska	Devine Ozigbo 18 yard run (Barret Pickering kick)	Nebraska 7–0
1	7:57	Purdue	D.J. Knox 42 yard run (Spencer Evans kick)	7–7
1	3:40	Purdue	Spencer Evans 31 yard field goal	Purdue 10–7
2	12:51	Purdue	David Blough 1 yard run (Spencer Evans kick)	Purdue 17–7
2	0:30	Purdue	Spencer Evans 25 yard field goal	Purdue 20–7
3	8:25	Purdue	Bryce Hopkins 12 yard pass from David Blough (Spencer Evans kick)	Purdue 27–7
3	6:18	Nebraska	JD Spielman 21 yard pass from Adrian Martinez (Barret Pickering kick)	Purdue 27–14
3	3:24	Purdue	D.J. Knox 6 yard run (D.J. Knox pass from David Blough)	Purdue 35–14
3	2:32	Nebraska	JD Spielman 21 yard pass from Adrian Martinez (Barret Pickering kick)	Purdue 35–21
4	14:56	Purdue	Markell Jones 6 yard run (Spencer Evans kick)	Purdue 42–21
4	13:04	Nebraska	Devine Ozigbo 23 yard run (Barret Pickering kick)	Purdue 42–28

Purdue Game starters

Position	Player
Quarterback	Adrian Martinez
Running Back	Devine Ozigbo
Wide Receiver	Stanley Morgan Jr.
Wide Receiver	Kade Warner
Wide Receiver	JD Speilman
Tight End	Jack Stoll
Left Tackle	Brenden Jaimes
Left Guard	Jerlad Foster
Center	Tanner Farmer
Right Guard	Boe Wilson
Right Tackle	Matt Farniok

Position	Player
Defensive End	Ben Stille
Nose Tackle	Carlos Davis
Defensive End	Freedom Akinmoladun
Outside Linebacker	Luke Gifford
Inside Linebacker	Dedrick Young
Inside Linebacker	Mohamed Barry
Outside Linebacker	Tyrin Ferguson
Cornerback	Dicaprio Bootle
Strong Safety	Tre Neal
Free Safety	Aaron Williams/Antonio Reed
Cornerback	Lamar Jackson

=== At Wisconsin ===
Nebraska at Wisconsin

Team	1	2	3	4	Total
Nebraska	0	3	14	7	24
• No. 16 Wisconsin	3	17	14	7	41

- Date: October 6
- Location: Camp Randall Stadium
  Madison, WI
- Game start: 6:30 p.m. CDT
- Elapsed time: 3:35
- Game attendance: 80,051
- Game weather: Cloudy, Wind North @ 9 mph, 53 degrees
- Referee: J. Servinski
- TV announcers (BTN): Kevin Kugler, J Leman, Rick Pizzo

Scoring summary
1	7:08	Wisconsin	Rafael Gaglianone 30 yard field goal	Wisconsin 3–0
2	12:58	Wisconsin	Rafael Gaglianone 28 yard field goal	Wisconsin 6–0
2	9:55	Nebraska	Barret Pickering 31 yard field goal	Wisconsin 6–3
2	6:51	Wisconsin	Jonathan Taylor 3 yard run (Rafael Gaglianone kick)	Wisconsin 13–3
2	0:42	Wisconsin	Jake Ferguson 14 yard pass from Alex Hornibrook (Rafael Gaglianone kick)	Wisconsin 20–3
3	14:13	Nebraska	JD Spielman 75 yard pass from Adrian Martinez (Barret Pickering kick)	Wisconsin 20–10
3	11:04	Wisconsin	Jonathan Taylor 21 yard run (Rafael Gaglianone kick)	Wisconsin 27–10
3	6:50	Wisconsin	Taiwan Deal 20 yard run (Rafael Gaglianone kick)	Wisconsin 34–10
3	4:20	Nebraska	Jack Stoll 12 yard pass from Adrian Martinez (Barret Pickering kick)	Wisconsin 34–17
4	12:50	Wisconsin	Jonathan Taylor 88 yard run (Rafael Gaglianone kick)	Wisconsin 41–17
4	9:11	Nebraska	Adrian Martinez 7 yard run (Barret Pickering kick)	Wisconsin 41–24

Wisconsin Game starters

Position	Player
Quarterback	Adrian Martinez
Running Back	Devine Ozigbo
Wide Receiver	Stanley Morgan Jr.
Wide Receiver	Kade Warner
Wide Receiver	JD Speilman
Tight End	Jack Stoll
Left Tackle	Brenden Jaimes
Left Guard	Jerlad Foster
Center	Tanner Farmer
Right Guard	Boe Wilson
Right Tackle	Matt Farniok

Position	Player
Defensive End	Ben Stille
Nose Tackle	Carlos Davis
Defensive End	Freedom Akinmoladun
Outside Linebacker	Luke Gifford
Inside Linebacker	Dedrick Young
Inside Linebacker	Mohamed Barry
Outside Linebacker	Alex Davis
Cornerback	Dicaprio Bootle
Strong Safety	Tre Neal
Free Safety	Aaron Williams/Antonio Reed
Cornerback	Eric Lee

=== At Northwestern ===
Nebraska at Northwestern

Team	1	2	3	4	OT	Total
Nebraska	7	6	7	11	0	31
• Northwestern	0	14	0	17	3	34

- Date: October 13
- Location: Ryan Field
  Evanston, IL
- Game start: 11:00 a.m. CDT
- Elapsed time: 3:32
- Game attendance: 47,330
- Game weather: Sunny, 44 degrees, Wind SW @ 11 mph
- Referee: Larry Smith
- TV announcers (ABC): Mark Jones, Dusty Dvoracek, Molly McGrath

Scoring summary
1	13:32	Nebraska	JD Spielman 42 yard pass from Adrian Martinez (Barret Pickering kick)	Nebraska 7–0
2	7:41	Northwestern	Flynn Nagel 21 yard pass from Clayton Thorson (Drew Luckenbaugh kick)	7–7
2	3:01	Northwestern	Earnest Brown IV 10 yard fumble recovery (Drew Luckenbaugh kick)	Northwestern 14–7
2	0:42	Nebraska	Devine Ozigbo 12 yard run (Barret Pickering kick failed)	Northwestern 14–13
3	7:07	Nebraska	Devine Ozigbo 1 yard run (Barret Pickering kick)	Nebraska 20–14
4	13:40	Nebraska	Maurice Washington 3 yard run (Adrian Martinez PAT rush)	Nebraska 28–14
4	12:31	Northwestern	Flynn Nagel 61 yard pass from Clayton Thorson (Drew Luckenbaugh kick)	Nebraska 28–21
4	5:41	Nebraska	Barret Pickering 34 yard field goal	Nebraska 31–21
4	2:27	Northwestern	Drew Luckenbaugh 31 yard field goal	Nebraska 31–24
4	0:12	Northwestern	JJ Jefferson 5 yard pass from Clayton Thorson (Drew Luckenbaugh kick)	31–31
OT		Northwestern	Drew Luckenbaugh 37 yard field goal	Northwestern 34–31

Northwestern Game starters

Position	Player
Quarterback	Adrian Martinez
Running Back	Devine Ozigbo
Wide Receiver	Stanley Morgan Jr.
Wide Receiver	Kade Warner
Wide Receiver	JD Speilman
Tight End	Jack Stoll
Left Tackle	Brenden Jaimes
Left Guard	Jerlad Foster
Center	Tanner Farmer
Right Guard	Boe Wilson
Right Tackle	Matt Farniok

Position	Player
Defensive End	Ben Stille
Nose Tackle	Carlos Davis
Defensive End	Freedom Akinmoladun
Outside Linebacker	Luke Gifford
Inside Linebacker	Dedrick Young
Inside Linebacker	Mohamed Barry
Outside Linebacker	Antonio Reed
Cornerback	Dicaprio Bootle
Strong Safety	Tre Neal
Free Safety	Aaron Williams
Cornerback	Lamar Jackson

=== Minnesota ===
Minnesota at Nebraska

Team	1	2	3	4	Total
Minnesota	0	8	14	6	28
• Nebraska	14	14	8	17	53

- Date: October 20
- Location: Memorial Stadium
  Lincoln, NE
- Game start: 2:30 p.m. CDT
- Elapsed time: 3:31
- Game attendance: 89,272
- Game weather: Sunny, Wind NNW @ 16 mph, 58 degrees
- Referee: Mike Canon
- TV announcers (BTN): Kevin Kugler, James Laurinaitis, Lisa Byington

Scoring summary
1	13:04	Nebraska	Devine Ozigbo 40 yard run (Barret Pickering kick)	Nebraska 7–0
1	1:25	Nebraska	Devine Ozigbo 59 yard run (Barret Pickering kick)	Nebraska 14–0
2	11:40	Nebraska	Adrian Martinez 3 yard run (Barret Pickering kick)	Nebraska 21–0
2	1:58	Nebraska	JD Spielman 9 yard pass from Adrian Martinez (Barret Pickering kick)	Nebraska 28–0
2	0:52	Minnesota	Demetrius Douglas 13 yard pass from Zack Annexstad (Matt Morse rush)	Nebraska 28–8
3	13:49	Minnesota	Mohamed Ibrahim 1 yard run (Emmit Carpenter kick)	Nebraska 28–15
3	7:22	Minnesota	Seth Green 4 yard run (Emmit Carpenter kick)	Nebraska 28–22
3	6:04	Nebraska	Stanley Morgan 35 yard pass from Adrian Martinez (Stanley Morgan pass from Adrian Martinez)	Nebraska 36–22
4	7:53	Nebraska	Barret Pickering 32 yard field goal	Nebraska 39–22
4	5:19	Nebraska	Stanley Morgan 67 yard pass from Adrian Martinez (Barret Pickering kick)	Nebraska 46–22
4	4:14	Minnesota	Tanner Morgan 9 yard run (Tanner Morgan rush failed)	Nebraska 46–28
4	1:57	Nebraska	Maurice Washington 3 yard run (Barret Pickering kick)	Nebraska 53–28

Minnesota Game starters

Position	Player
Quarterback	Adrian Martinez
Running Back	Devine Ozigbo
Wide Receiver	Stanley Morgan Jr.
Wide Receiver	Kade Warner
Wide Receiver	JD Speilman
Tight End	Jack Stoll
Left Tackle	Brenden Jaimes
Left Guard	Jerlad Foster
Center	Tanner Farmer
Right Guard	Boe Wilson
Right Tackle	Matt Farniok

Position	Player
Defensive End	Ben Stille
Nose Tackle	Carlos Davis
Defensive End	Freedom Akinmoladun
Outside Linebacker	Luke Gifford
Inside Linebacker	Dedrick Young
Inside Linebacker	Mohamed Barry
Outside Linebacker	Alex Davis
Cornerback	Dicaprio Bootle
Strong Safety	Tre Neal
Free Safety	Aaron Williams/Antonio Reed
Cornerback	Lamar Jackson

After starting the season 0–6, Nebraska finally got its first win under Scott Frost against Minnesota

=== Bethune–Cookman ===
Bethune–Cookman at Nebraska

Team	1	2	3	4	Total
Bethune–Cookman	3	0	0	6	9
• Nebraska	28	10	0	7	45

- Date: October 27
- Location: Memorial Stadium
  Lincoln, NE
- Game start: 11:00 a.m. CDT
- Elapsed time: 2:57
- Game attendance: 88,735
- Game weather: Clear, Sunny, Wind SW @ 4 mph
- Referee: Don Capron
- TV announcers (BTN): Lisa Byington, Glen Mason, Damon Benning

Scoring summary
1	12:37	Nebraska	Devine Ozigbo 14 yard run (Barret Pickering kick)	Nebraska 7–0
1	10:47	Nebraska	JD Spielman 77 yard punt return (Barret Pickering kick)	Nebraska 14–0
1	8:28	Bethune-Cookman	Uriel Hernandez 28 yard field goal	Nebraska 14–3
1	6:08	Nebraska	Stanley Morgan 3 yard pass from Adrian Martinez (Barret Pickering kick)	Nebraska 21–3
1	2:55	Nebraska	Stanley Morgan 27 yard pass from Adrian Martinez (Barret Pickering kick)	Nebraska 28–3
2	5:02	Nebraska	Maurice Washington 8 yard run (Barret Pickering kick)	Nebraska 35–3
2	0:12	Nebraska	Barret Pickering 29 yard field goal	Nebraska 38–3
4	13:39	Nebraska	Noah Vedral 20 yard run (Barret Pickering kick)	Nebraska 45–3
4	0:00	Bethune-Cookman	Alfred Adams 5 yard run	Nebraska 45–9

Bethune-Cookman Game starters

Position	Player
Quarterback	Adrian Martinez
Running Back	Devine Ozigbo
Wide Receiver	Stanley Morgan Jr.
Wide Receiver	Bryan Reimers
Wide Receiver	JD Speilman
Tight End	Jack Stoll
Left Tackle	Brenden Jaimes
Left Guard	Jerlad Foster
Center	Tanner Farmer
Right Guard	Boe Wilson
Right Tackle	Matt Farniok

Position	Player
Defensive End	Ben Stille
Nose Tackle	Carlos Davis
Defensive End	Freedom Akinmoladun
Outside Linebacker	Luke Gifford
Inside Linebacker	Dedrick Young
Inside Linebacker	Mohamed Barry
Outside Linebacker	Alex Davis
Cornerback	Dicaprio Bootle
Strong Safety	Tre Neal
Free Safety	Antonio Reed
Cornerback	Lamar Jackson

=== At Ohio State ===
Nebraska at Ohio State

Team	1	2	3	4	Total
Nebraska	7	14	0	10	31
• Ohio State	16	0	14	6	36

- Date: November 3
- Location: Ohio Stadium
  Columbus, OH
- Game start: 11:00 a.m. CDT
- Elapsed time: 3:40
- Game attendance: 104,425
- Game weather: Sunny, 50 degrees, Wind 10 mph
- Referee: Ron Snodgrass
- TV announcers (FOX): Joe Davis, Brady Quinn, Bruce Feldman

Scoring summary
1	9:56	Nebraska	Devine Ozigbo 1 yard run (Barret Pickering kick)	Nebraska 7–0
1	7:10	Ohio State	Keandre Jones safety	Nebraska 7–2
1	5:11	Ohio State	Johnnie Dixon 42 yard pass from Dwayne Haskins (Blake Haubeil kick)	Ohio State 9–7
1	1:51	Ohio State	J. K. Dobbins 10 yard run (Blake Haubeil kick)	Ohio State 16–7
2	4:52	Nebraska	Adrian Martinez 2 yard run (Barret Pickering kick)	Ohio State 16–14
2	0:15	Nebraska	Adrian Martinez 2 yard run (Barret Pickering kick)	Nebraska 21–16
3	5:39	Ohio State	J.K. Dobbins 3 yard run (Blake Haubeil kick)	Ohio State 23–21
3	1:43	Ohio State	Parris Campbell 9 yard pass from Dwayne Haskins (Blake Haubeil kick)	Ohio State 30–21
4	7:46	Nebraska	Barret Pickering 18 yard field goal	Ohio State 30–24
4	4:52	Ohio State	J.K. Dobbins 42 yard run (Dwayne Haskins rush failed)	Ohio State 36–24
4	2:57	Nebraska	JD Spielman 17 yard pass from Adrian Martinez (Barret Pickering kick)	Ohio State 36–31

Ohio State Game starters

Position	Player
Quarterback	Adrian Martinez
Running Back	Devine Ozigbo
Wide Receiver	Stanley Morgan Jr.
Wide Receiver	Mike Williams
Wide Receiver	JD Speilman
Tight End	Jack Stoll
Left Tackle	Brenden Jaimes
Left Guard	Jerlad Foster
Center	Tanner Farmer
Right Guard	Boe Wilson
Right Tackle	Matt Farniok

Position	Player
Defensive End	Ben Stille
Nose Tackle	Carlos Davis
Defensive End	Freedom Akinmoladun
Outside Linebacker	Luke Gifford
Inside Linebacker	Dedrick Young
Inside Linebacker	Mohamed Barry
Outside Linebacker	JoJo Domann
Cornerback	Dicaprio Bootle
Strong Safety	Tre Neal
Free Safety	Aaron Williams/Antonio Reed
Cornerback	Lamar Jackson

=== Illinois ===
Illinois at Nebraska

Team	1	2	3	4	Total
Illinois	14	7	0	14	35
• Nebraska	21	17	7	9	54

- Date: November 10
- Location: Memorial Stadium
  Lincoln, NE
- Game start: 11:00 a.m. CDT
- Elapsed time: 3:29
- Game attendance: 88,316
- Game weather: 23 degrees, Cloudy, Wind S @ 17–21 mph
- Referee: Jeff Servinski
- TV announcers (BTN): Brandon Gaudin, Glen Mason, Elise Menaker

Scoring summary
1	13:58	Nebraska	Stanley Morgan 37 yard pass from Adrian Martinez (Barret Pickering kick)	Nebraska 7–0
1	10:39	Illinois	AJ Bush 11 yard run (Chase McLaughlin kick)	7–7
1	7:27	Nebraska	Adrian Martinez 9 yard run (Barret Pickering kick)	Nebraska 14–7
1	3:40	Illinois	AJ Bush 8 yard run (Chase McLaughlin kick)	14–14
1	1:54	Nebraska	Stanley Morgan 32 yard pass from Adrian Martinez (Barret Pickering kick)	Nebraska 21–14
2	10:36	Nebraska	Barret Pickering 27 yard field goal	Nebraska 24–14
2	6:00	Nebraska	Devine Ozigbo 66 yard run (Barret Pickering kick)	Nebraska 31–14
2	0:58	Illinois	AJ Bush 2 yard run (Chase McLaughlin kick)	Nebraska 31–21
2	0:03	Nebraska	Jack Stoll 12 yard pass from Adrian Martinez (Barret Pickering kick)	Nebraska 38–21
3	4:12	Nebraska	Devine Ozigbo 4 yard run (Barret Pickering kick)	Nebraska 45–21
4	12:10	Nebraska	Marquel Dismuke safety	Nebraska 47–21
4	7:44	Illinois	RaVon Bonner 2 yard run (Chase McLaughlin kick)	Nebraska 47–28
4	6:15	Nebraska	Devine Ozigbo 60 yard run (Barret Pickering kick)	Nebraska 54–28
4	3:21	Illinois	Dre Brown 15 yard run (Chase McLaughlin kick)	Nebraska 54–35

Illinois Game starters

Position	Player
Quarterback	Adrian Martinez
Running Back	Devine Ozigbo
Wide Receiver	Stanley Morgan Jr.
Wide Receiver	Kade Warner
Wide Receiver	JD Speilman
Tight End	Jack Stoll
Left Tackle	Brenden Jaimes
Left Guard	Jerlad Foster
Center	Tanner Farmer
Right Guard	Boe Wilson
Right Tackle	Matt Farniok

Position	Player
Defensive End	Ben Stille
Nose Tackle	Carlos Davis
Defensive End	Freedom Akinmoladun
Outside Linebacker	Luke Gifford
Inside Linebacker	Dedrick Young
Inside Linebacker	Mohamed Barry
Outside Linebacker	JoJo Domann
Cornerback	Dicaprio Bootle
Strong Safety	Tre Neal
Free Safety	Aaron Williams
Cornerback	Lamar Jackson

=== Michigan State ===
Michigan State at Nebraska

Team	1	2	3	4	Total
Michigan State	3	0	0	3	6
• Nebraska	0	0	0	9	9

- Date: November 17
- Location: Memorial Stadium
  Lincoln, NE
- Game start: 11:00 a.m. CDT
- Elapsed time: 3:18
- Game attendance: 88,793
- Game weather: Overcast, 27 degrees, Wind N/NE @ 16 mph
- Referee: Don Capron
- TV announcers (FOX): Brian Custer, Ben Leber

Scoring summary
1	7:46	Michigan State	Matt Coghlin 34 yard field goal	Michigan State 3–0
4	12:13	Michigan State	Matt Coghlin 26 yard field goal	Michigan State 6–0
4	11:07	Nebraska	Barret Pickering 36 yard field goal	Michigan State 6–3
4	8:07	Nebraska	Barret Pickering 20 yard field goal	6–6
4	5:13	Nebraska	Barret Pickering 47 yard field goal	Nebraska 9–6

Michigan State Game starters

Position	Player
Quarterback	Adrian Martinez
Running Back	Devine Ozigbo
Wide Receiver	Stanley Morgan Jr.
Wide Receiver	Kade Warner
Wide Receiver	Bryan Reimers
Tight End	Jack Stoll
Left Tackle	Brenden Jaimes
Left Guard	Jerlad Foster
Center	Tanner Farmer
Right Guard	Boe Wilson
Right Tackle	Matt Farniok

Position	Player
Defensive End	Carlos Davis
Nose Tackle	Mick Stoltenberg
Defensive End	Freedom Akinmoladun
Outside Linebacker	Luke Gifford
Inside Linebacker	Dedrick Young
Inside Linebacker	Mohamed Barry
Outside Linebacker	Tyrin Ferguson
Cornerback	Dicaprio Bootle
Strong Safety	Tre Neal
Free Safety	Aaron Williams/Antonio Reed
Cornerback	Lamar Jackson

=== At Iowa ===
Nebraska at Iowa

Team	1	2	3	4	Total
Nebraska	7	6	0	15	28
• Iowa	7	14	7	3	31

- Date: November 23
- Location: Kinnick Stadium
  Iowa City, IA
- Game start: 11:00 a.m. CDT
- Elapsed time: 3:13
- Game attendance: 65,299
- Game weather: Overcast, 44 degrees, Wind SSE @ 10 mph
- Referee: John O'Neill
- TV announcers (FOX): Brian Custer, Ben Leber, Jen Hale

Scoring summary
1	9:37	Iowa	Brandon Smith 15 yard pass from Nate Stanley (Miguel Recinos kick)	Iowa 7–0
1	5:55	Nebraska	Jack Stoll 4 yard pass from Adrian Martinez (Barret Pickering kick)	7–7
2	14:21	Iowa	Toren Young 4 yard run (Miguel Recinos kick)	Iowa 14–7
2	11:30	Nebraska	Barret Pickering 27 yard field goal	Iowa 14–10
2	0:45	Iowa	Mekhi Sargent 15 yard run (Migule Recinos kick)	Iowa 21–10
2	0:00	Nebraska	Barret Pickering 46 yard field goal	Iowa 21–13
3	9:13	Iowa	Mekhi Sargent 5 yard pass from Nate Stanley (Miguel Recinos kick)	Iowa 28–13
4	13:57	Nebraska	Maurice Washington 28 yard pass from Adrian Martinez (Barret Pickering kick)	Iowa 28–20
4	3:22	Nebraska	Adrian Martinez 3 yard run (Kade Warner pass from Adrian Martinez)	28–28
4	0:00	Iowa	Miguel Recinos 41 yard field goal	Iowa 31–28

Iowa Game starters

Position	Player
Quarterback	Adrian Martinez
Running Back	Devine Ozigbo
Wide Receiver	Stanley Morgan Jr.
Wide Receiver	Bryan Reimers
Wide Receiver	Maurice Washington
Tight End	Jack Stoll
Left Tackle	Brenden Jaimes
Left Guard	Jerlad Foster
Center	Tanner Farmer
Right Guard	Boe Wilson
Right Tackle	Matt Farniok

Position	Player
Defensive End	Ben Stille
Nose Tackle	Carlos Davis
Defensive End	Freedom Akinmoladun
Outside Linebacker	Luke Gifford
Inside Linebacker	Dedrick Young
Inside Linebacker	Mohamed Barry
Outside Linebacker	Tyrin Ferguson
Cornerback	Dicaprio Bootle
Strong Safety	Tre Neal
Free Safety	Aaron Williams/Antonio Reed
Cornerback	Lamar Jackson

== Big Ten awards ==
=== Player of the Week ===
Weekly Awards
Player	Award	Week Awarded	Ref.
Adrian Martinez	Big Ten Freshman of the Week	Week 8	
Adrian Martinez	Big Ten Freshman of the Week	Week 10	
Devine Ozigbo	Big Ten Offensive Player of the Week	Week 11	
Adrian Martinez	Big Ten Freshman of the Week	Week 11	
Barret Pickering	Big Ten Special Teams Player of the Week	Week 12	

=== All-Conference awards ===
2018 Big Ten All-Conference Teams and Awards

Media All-Big Ten
Position	Player	Team
WR	Stanley Morgan Jr.	Second Team
RB	Devine Ozigbo	Third Team
WR	JD Spielman	Third Team
LB	Mohamed Barry	Third Team
DB	Dicaprio Bootle	Third Team
QB	Adrian Martinez	Honorable Mention
OG	Boe Wilson	Honorable Mention
OT	Brenden Jaimes	Honorable Mention
DL	Khalil Davis	Honorable Mention
LB	Luke Gifford	Honorable Mention
P	Isaac Armstrong	Honorable Mention

Coaches All-Big Ten
Position	Player	Team
WR	Stanley Morgan Jr.	Second Team
WR	JD Spielman	Third Team
DB	Dicaprio Bootle	Third Team
QB	Adrian Martinez	Honorable Mention
RB	Devine Ozigbo	Honorable Mention
OT	Brenden Jaimes	Honorable Mention
DL	Carlos Davis	Honorable Mention
LB	Luke Gifford	Honorable Mention
LB	Mohamed Barry	Honorable Mention
P	Isaac Armstrong	Honorable Mention
