= Greg Bell (running back, born 1998) =

American gridiron football player (born 1998)

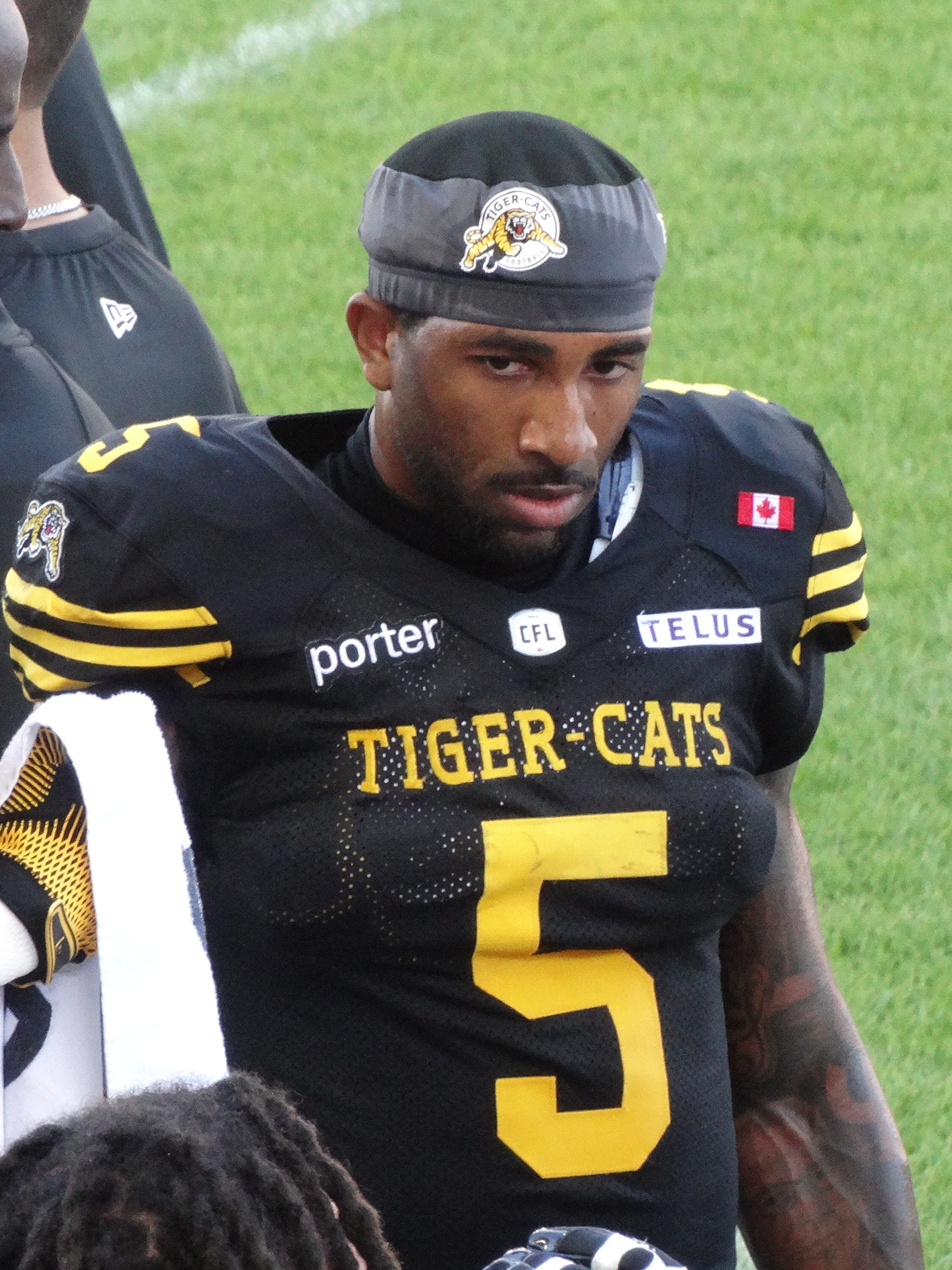
- Bell with the Hamilton Tiger-Cats in 2025

No. 5 – Ottawa Redblacks
- Position: Running back
- CFL status: American

Personal information
- Born: June 16, 1998 (age 28); San Diego, California, U.S.
- Listed height: 6 ft 0 in (1.83 m)
- Listed weight: 200 lb (91 kg)

Career information
- High school: Bonita Vista (Chula Vista, California)
- College: Arizona Western (2016–2017); Nebraska (2018); San Diego State (2019–2021)
- NFL draft: 2022: undrafted

Career history
- Detroit Lions (2022); Pittsburgh Steelers (2023)*; Hamilton Tiger-Cats (2024–2025); Ottawa Redblacks (2026–present)
- * Offseason or practice squad member only

Awards and highlights
- CFL East All-Star (2025); Second-team All-MWC (2020, 2021)

Career CFL statistics as of 2026
- Rushing yards: 1,979
- Rushing average: 5.5
- Rushing touchdowns: 11
- Receptions: 131
- Receiving yards: 942
- Receiving touchdowns: 3
- Stats at CFL.ca
- Stats at Pro Football Reference

Greg Alonzo Bell III (born June 16, 1998) is an American professional football running back for the Ottawa Redblacks of the Canadian Football League (CFL). He played college football at Arizona Western, Nebraska and San Diego State.

== Early life ==
Bell was born on June 16, 1998, to Gregory Bell and Erica Williams in San Diego, California. Bell went to high school at Bonita Vista High School in nearby Chula Vista, California. As a senior, he put up 2,632 yards and 34 touchdowns. Bell received a scholarship from San Diego State University.

== College career ==
=== Arizona Western ===
Bell attended to Arizona Western for his first two collegiate seasons. He scored his first touchdown with the team on September 30, 2016, during a 56–0 blowout win. He finished the season with 1,187 yards and 7 touchdowns. His 948 conference yards led the Western States Football League (WSFL).

In 2017, Bell put up 1,217 yards and 11 touchdowns. He had a four-touchdown game against Eastern Arizona and a 211-yard game against Glendale.

=== Nebraska ===
Bell transferred to Nebraska in 2018. This was the first year under the new redshirt rule stating players can redshirt after four games. Over the first two games of the season, Bell mounted 168 yards on 27 attempts. However, over the next two games, he had 5 yards on 8 attempts. He lost the starting job to veteran Devine Ozigbo.

Bell left the Nebraska program on October 5, 2018, shortly after losing the starting job. He stated he had "earned the starting job and feel I have continued to work the same way but feel I am not being used to my fullest potential." He was released from his scholarship shortly after. After this, Bell posted on Twitter schools he was not allowed to transfer to. One of these schools was Oregon State. This led to Nebraska head coach Scott Frost to publicly accuse Oregon State of tampering with past transfers.

=== San Diego State ===
Bell announced his intentions to go to San Diego State University (SDSU) on March 14, 2019. He was to join the team by walking on; SDSU had no scholarships left and therefore was unable to give Bell a scholarship. Before the start of the 2019 season, Bell suffered an injury during weight training that required surgery and sidelined him for the entirety of the season.

In 2020, Bell became the first Aztec to record three straight 100-yard rushing games in a players first three games with the program. He also became the first Aztec since Rashaad Penny in 2017 to record four straight 100-yard rushing games. Bell finished the season with 637 rushing yards on 113 attempts and six touchdowns.

In 2021, Bell became the 18th 1,000 yard rusher in Aztec history. He finished the season 1,091 rushing yards on 245 attempts and 9 touchdowns. He finished with a total of 1,728 rushing yards, which is the 19th most in SDSU program history.

=== Statistics ===
Year	Team	Rushing						Receiving				
Year	Team	GP	Att	Yds	Avg	Lng	TD	Rec	Yds	Avg	Lng	TD
2016	AZ Western	11	181	1,187	6.5	89	7	1	13	13.0	13	0
2017	AZ Western	10	201	1,217	6.0	67	11	15	201	13.4	36	0
2018	Nebraska	4	35	173	4.9	45	0	4	14	3.5	6	0
2019	San Diego State	DNP										
2020	San Diego State	7	113	637	5.6	62	6	11	114	16.3	29	1
2021	San Diego State	14	245	1,091	4.5	55	9	4	5	0.4	7	0
Career		46	775	4,305	5.5	89	33	35	347	9.9	36	1

== Professional career ==
Pre-draft measurables
Height	Weight	Arm length	Hand span	Wingspan	40-yard dash	10-yard split	20-yard split	20-yard shuttle	Three-cone drill	Vertical jump	Broad jump	Bench press
5 ft 10 1/2 in (1.79 m)	201 lb (91 kg)	30 7/8 in (0.78 m)	9 3/8 in (0.24 m)	6 ft 1 in (1.85 m)	4.63 s	1.59 s	2.67 s	4.32 s	7.17 s	31.0 in (0.79 m)	10 ft 0 in (3.05 m)	17 reps
All values from NFL Combine/Pro Day

=== Detroit Lions ===
Bell went undrafted in the 2022 NFL draft. He was picked up by the Lions on May 1, 2022. He was signed to a 3-year, $2.575 million deal, with $100,000 guaranteed. On July 28, during the Lions' second training day, Bell went down with a hamstring injury. Bell was not claimed through waivers and was put on the Lions' injured reserve. Players put on injured reserve before the 53-man preseason deadline aren't able to return from injured reserve, effectively ending Bell's season.

On July 22, 2023, Bell was waived by the Detroit Lions.

=== Pittsburgh Steelers ===
On August 1, 2023, Bell signed with the Pittsburgh Steelers. He was waived on August 29, 2023 and re-signed to the practice squad. He was released from the practice squad on October 3, 2023.

=== Hamilton Tiger-Cats ===
==== 2024 season ====
On March 28, 2024, it was announced that Bell had signed with the Hamilton Tiger-Cats. Having started the season on the practice roster, Bell came into the Week 4 matchup against the Ottawa Redblacks after James Butler was injured in the previous week. He totaled up 20 touches for 96 scrimmage yards in the 22–24 loss. Bell's next start would come in Week 11 versus the Edmonton Elks where he would record 173 scrimmages yards on 20 touches and two touchdowns in the 22–47 loss. Bell would post two more rushing touchdowns the following week against Winnipeg but only racked up 45 scrimmage yards. Following his 118-yard performance in an upset win against Toronto, Bell was given the starting role at running back. Bell went over 100 yards again against the Redblacks, including the game-sealing touchdown to put him at 111 total yards for the day. In Week 20, Bell would have his best game of the season, rushing for 139 yards on 15 attempts and catching 3 passes for 23 yards in the 42–24 victory over the Calgary Stampeders. Bell finished the season with 625 rushing yards and 230 receiving yards for 855 total scrimmage yards and seven scrimmage touchdowns.

==== 2025 season ====
In 2025, Bell rushed for 1,038 yards in 15 games and scored six touchdowns. He became a free agent upon the expiry of his contract on February 10, 2026.

=== Ottawa Redblacks ===
On February 10, 2026, it was announced that Bell had signed a two-year contract with the Ottawa Redblacks.

== CFL statistics ==
=== Regular season ===
Year	Team	Games	Rushing					Receiving				
Year	Team	GP	Att	Yds	Y/A	Lng	TD	Rec	Yds	Avg	Lng	TD
2024	HAM	8	94	625	6.6	52	6	29	230	7.9	63	1
2025	HAM	15	184	1038	5.7	30	5	62	426	6.9	24	1
