= Adrian Martinez (American football) =

American football player (born 2000)

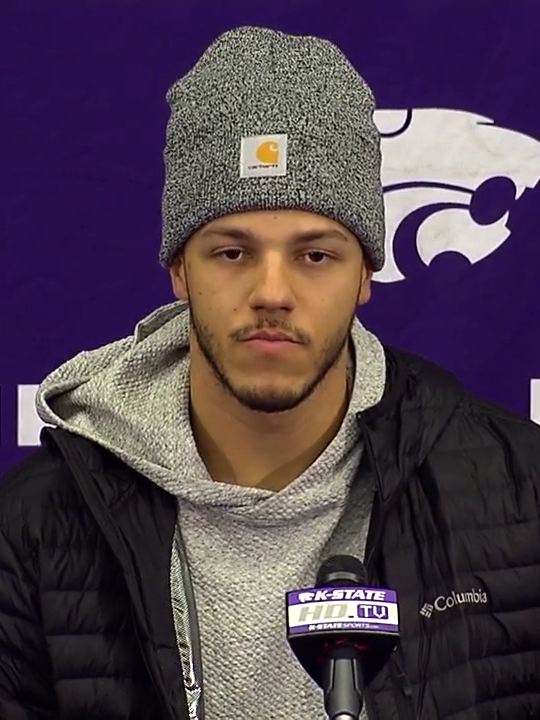
- Martinez in 2022

Profile
- Position: Quarterback

Personal information
- Born: January 7, 2000 (age 26); Hanford, California, U.S.
- Listed height: 6 ft 2 in (1.88 m)
- Listed weight: 220 lb (100 kg)

Career information
- High school: Clovis West (Clovis, California)
- College: Nebraska (2018–2021); Kansas State (2022)
- NFL draft: 2023: undrafted

Career history
- Detroit Lions (2023)*; Birmingham Stallions (2024); New York Jets (2024); San Francisco 49ers (2025); New York Jets (2025); San Francisco 49ers (2025–2026)*; Seattle Seahawks (2026)*
- * Offseason or practice squad member only

Awards and highlights
- UFL champion (2024); UFL championship game MVP (2024); UFL MVP (2024); All-UFL team (2024); UFL rushing yards leader (2024)

Career NFL statistics as of 2025
- Games played: 1
- Rushing attempts: 1
- Rushing yards: –1
- Stats at Pro Football Reference

Adrian Martinez (born January 7, 2000) is an American professional football quarterback. He played college football for the Kansas State Wildcats and Nebraska Cornhuskers. Martinez played for the Birmingham Stallions of the United Football League (UFL) in 2024, leading the league in rushing yards, as well as making the All-UFL team, earning season MVP, championship game MVP, and winning the 2024 UFL championship. He was most recently part of the San Francisco 49ers of the National Football League (NFL).

== Early life ==
Martinez was born on January 1, 2000 in Hanford, California. He attended the Clovis West High School in Fresno, California. He played both football and basketball in high school. He missed his senior season of football due to a torn labrum he suffered while playing basketball. As a junior, he was the Fresno Bee football player of the year after he passed for 2,562 yards with 25 touchdowns and rushed for 1,462 yards and 14 touchdowns.

Martinez was regarded as a four-star prospect and was the seventh-highest-ranked dual-threat quarterback in the class of 2018 according to the 247Sports Composite. Martinez originally committed to play college football at the University of California, Berkeley and the University of Tennessee before ultimately deciding on the University of Nebraska–Lincoln.

== College career ==
=== Nebraska ===
==== 2018 ====
First-year Nebraska head coach Scott Frost named Martinez the starting quarterback heading into the 2018 season opener, making him the first true freshman to ever begin a season as the starting quarterback at Nebraska. In the Cornhuskers' opening game against Colorado, Martinez threw for 187 yards, one touchdown, and an interception, and added 117 rushing yards and two rushing touchdowns on the ground. Nebraska lost the game 33–28. Martinez went down with a knee injury in the final minutes of the Colorado game, an injury that also caused him to miss the following game against Troy, which also ended in a loss for Nebraska. Martinez returned from injury but could not help the Cornhuskers return to winning form, as the team lost its first six games of the year for the worst start to a season in program history. Martinez's first career win came against Minnesota, where he threw for 276 yards and three passing touchdowns, and ran for another touchdown on the ground in the 53–28 victory. He was named Big Ten Co-Freshman of the Week (with Rondale Moore) for the performance. Martinez earned two more Big Ten Freshman of the Week honors following a loss to Ohio State on November 3 and a victory over Illinois on November 10.

Martinez finished his freshman season with 2,617 passing yards, 17 passing touchdowns, and eight interceptions. He added 629 rushing yards and eight rushing touchdowns on the ground. He finished sixth in the Big Ten Conference in passing yards and total touchdowns, and was fourth in passer rating.

==== 2019 ====
Martinez received high expectations heading into his sophomore season in 2019, earning pre-season honors at Big Ten Media Days and even appearing in Heisman Trophy candidate discussions. However, he struggled mightily, leading Nebraska to a 5–7 record in a disappointing season.

==== 2020 ====
After a disappointing 2019 campaign and a COVID-19-impacted offseason, Martinez entered the 2020 season under pressure. In the opening game at Ohio State, Martinez went 12-15 for 105 yards passing, and 85 yards and a touchdown on the ground. After a lackluster performance in the week two loss at Northwestern, head coach Scott Frost decided to start redshirt freshman Luke McCaffery in the upcoming game vs. Penn State. Martinez would return to the field just one game later in the 4th quarter of the Illinois game, after McCaffery threw his third interception of the contest. Martinez would remain the starter for the rest of the season, where he showed improvement from his first two starts. The final game of the season at Rutgers was his best game, where he completed 24 of 28 passes for 255 yards, 1 touchdown, 2 interceptions. In that game he also had an additional 181 rushing yards, with 2 rushing touchdowns.

In seven games, Martinez finished his abbreviated junior season with 1,055 passing yards, 4 passing touchdowns, and three interceptions. He ran for 521 yards (5.7 AVG) and 7 rushing touchdowns.

==== 2021 ====
In 2021, Martinez played in 11 games for the Huskers, who went 3–9, becoming the first team in Division I college football history to lose 9 games by single digits. He completed 189 of 306 passes for 2,867 yards, 14 touchdowns and 10 interceptions.

On December 2, 2021, Martinez entered the transfer portal with one year of eligibility remaining.

On December 16, 2021, Martinez announced he would be transferring to Kansas State for his final year.

=== Kansas State ===
In the 2022 season, Martinez split time at the quarterback position with Will Howard. Martinez had 148 rushing yards and four rushing touchdowns against Oklahoma and 171 rushing yards and three rushing touchdowns against Texas Tech during the season. Overall, in the 2022 season, Martinez had 1,261 passing yards, six passing touchdowns, and one interception to go with 111 carries for 627 rushing yards and ten rushing touchdowns. The quarterback duo helped lead the Wildcats to a 10–4 record and a Big 12 Championship.

== Professional career ==
Pre-draft measurables
Height	Weight	Arm length	Hand span	Wingspan	40-yard dash	10-yard split	20-yard split	20-yard shuttle	Vertical jump	Broad jump
6 ft 1 7/8 in (1.88 m)	221 lb (100 kg)	31 1/4 in (0.79 m)	9 5/8 in (0.24 m)	6 ft 4 5/8 in (1.95 m)	4.55 s	1.61 s	2.70 s	4.21 s	36.0 in (0.91 m)	9 ft 7 in (2.92 m)
All values from Kansas State's Pro Day

=== Detroit Lions ===
Martinez was signed by the Detroit Lions as an undrafted free agent on May 12, 2023. He was waived by the Lions on August 29.

=== Birmingham Stallions ===
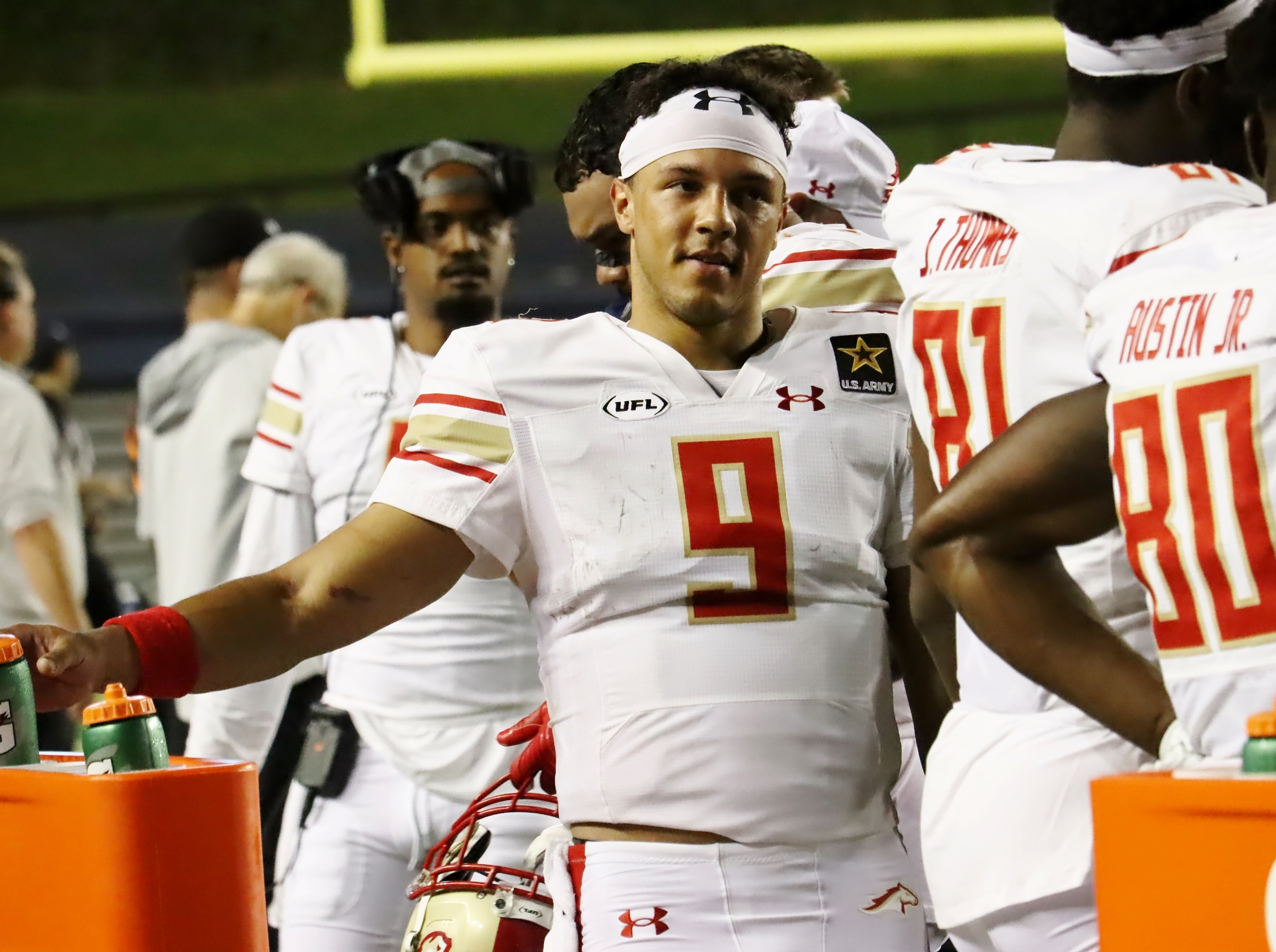
Martinez with the Birmingham Stallions in 2024

On December 24, 2023, Martinez was signed by the Birmingham Stallions of the United Football League (UFL). He was named to the 2024 All-UFL team on June 5, 2024 and league MVP on June 10. In 10 appearances for Birmingham, Martinez completed 134 passes for 1,750 yards, 15 touchdowns, and three interceptions; he also rushed for 530 yards and three touchdowns over 54 carries. He was named the 2024 UFL Championship MVP on June 16.

=== New York Jets (first stint) ===
On July 27, 2024, Martinez was signed by the New York Jets. He was waived on August 27, and re-signed to the practice squad. Martinez signed a reserve/future contract with the Jets on January 6, 2025. He was waived on August 24.

=== San Francisco 49ers (first stint) ===
On August 27, 2025, Martinez signed with the San Francisco 49ers' practice squad. He was promoted to the team's active roster on October 2, amid Brock Purdy and Mac Jones both nursing injuries. Martinez played his first NFL snap on November 2, taking a knee for the final play in the team's Week 9 game against the New York Giants; he entered the contest after Jones voluntarily subbed himself out. On November 15, Martinez was waived by the 49ers, following Purdy's return from injury. On November 18, he was re-signed to the practice squad. On December 9, Martinez was released by San Francisco.

=== New York Jets (second stint) ===
On December 10, 2025, Martinez signed with the New York Jets' practice squad. Martinez was utilized as a practice squad elevation for the team's Week 15 game against the Jacksonville Jaguars, due to injuries to Justin Fields and Tyrod Taylor, but did not play a snap. He was released by the Jets on December 16.

=== San Francisco 49ers (second stint) ===
On December 17, 2025, Martinez was signed to the San Francisco 49ers' practice squad. On January 20, 2026, he signed a reserve/futures contract with San Francisco. On August 30, Martinez was waived by the 49ers as a part of final roster cuts.

=== Seattle Seahawks ===
On November 4, 2026, Martinez was signed to the Seattle Seahawks' practice squad. He was waived on November 17.

== Career statistics ==
=== NFL ===
==== Regular season ====
Year	Team	Games			Passing									Rushing					Sacks		Fumbles	
Year	Team	GP	GS	Record	Cmp	Att	Pct	Yds	Y/A	Lng	TD	Int	Rtg	Att	Yds	Avg	Lng	TD	Sck	SckY	Fum	Lost
2024	NYJ	0	0	—	DNP																	
2025	SF	1	0	—	0	0	0.0	0	—	0	0	0	0.0	1	−1	−1.0	–1	0	0	0	0	0
2025	NYJ	0	0	—	DNP																	
Career		1	0	—	0	0	0.0	0	—	0	0	0	0.0	1	–1	–1.0	–1	0	0	0	0	0

=== UFL ===
Legend
	UFL MVP
	UFL Championship Game MVP
	Led the league
	League champion
**Bold**	Career high

==== Regular season ====
Year	Team	League	Games			Passing								Rushing			
Year	Team	League	GP	GS	Record	Cmp	Att	Pct	Yds	Y/A	TD	Int	Rtg	Att	Yds	Avg	TD
2024	BHAM	UFL	10	7	6–1	134	229	58.5	1,748	7.6	15	3	99.0	54	528	9.7	3
Career			10	7	6–1	134	229	58.5	1,748	7.6	15	3	99.0	54	528	9.7	3

==== Postseason ====
Year	Team	League	Games			Passing								Rushing			
Year	Team	League	GP	GS	Record	Cmp	Att	Pct	Yds	Y/A	TD	Int	Rtg	Att	Yds	Avg	TD
2024	BHAM	UFL	2	2	2–0	23	42	54.7	262	6.2	2	1	79.5	15	60	4.0	2
Career			2	2	2–0	23	42	54.7	262	6.2	2	1	79.5	15	60	4.0	2

=== College ===
Season	Team	Games			Passing								Rushing			
Season	Team	GP	GS	Record	Comp	Att	Pct	Yards	Avg	TD	Int	Rate	Att	Yards	Avg	TD
2018	Nebraska	**11**	**11**	4−7	**224**	**347**	64.6	2,617	7.5	**17**	8	139.5	140	**629**	4.5	8
2019	Nebraska	10	10	5−5	149	251	59.4	1,956	7.8	10	9	130.8	**144**	626	4.3	7
2020	Nebraska	7	6	2−4	108	151	**71.5**	1,055	7.0	4	3	135.0	91	521	5.7	7
2021	Nebraska	**11**	**11**	3−8	189	306	61.8	**2,863**	**9.4**	14	**10**	**148.9**	133	525	3.9	**13**
2022	Kansas State	10	9	**6−3**	118	184	64.1	1,261	6.9	6	1	131.4	111	627	**5.6**	10
Career		49	47	20−27	788	1,193	63.6	9,752	7.9	51	31	138.3	619	2,928	4.7	45
