= Lamar Jackson (cornerback) =

American football player (born 1998)

No. 21 – Orlando Storm
- Position: Cornerback
- Roster status: Active

Personal information
- Born: April 13, 1998 (age 28); Elk Grove, California, U.S.
- Listed height: 6 ft 2 in (1.88 m)
- Listed weight: 206 lb (93 kg)

Career information
- High school: Franklin (Elk Grove)
- College: Nebraska (2016–2019)
- NFL draft: 2020: undrafted

Career history
- New York Jets (2020–2021); Chicago Bears (2022); Denver Broncos (2022); Kansas City Chiefs (2023)*; Carolina Panthers (2023–2024)*; Atlanta Falcons (2024)*; Orlando Storm (2026–present)
- * Offseason or practice squad member only

Awards and highlights
- Second-team All-Big Ten (2019)

Career NFL statistics as of 2024
- Total tackles: 31
- Pass deflections: 4
- Stats at Pro Football Reference

Lamar Jackson (born April 13, 1998) is an American professional football cornerback for the Orlando Storm of the United Football League (UFL). He played college football for the Nebraska Cornhuskers and was signed as an undrafted free agent by the New York Jets in 2020.

== Early life ==
Jackson played quarterback, cornerback, and safety at Franklin High School. Jackson played in the 2015 Under Armour All-American game following his senior season. Jackson committed to Nebraska on February 3, 2016, turning down offers from California, UCLA, Utah, and Washington State.

== College career ==
After recording 40 tackles and three interceptions in his senior season, Jackson was named Nebraska's Defensive MVP and a Second-team All-Big Ten player.

=== Statistics ===
Year	School	G	GS	Solo	Ast	Tot	Sacks	Int	PD	FF	FR
2016	Nebraska	13	1	14	3	17	1	0	0	0	0
2017	Nebraska	12	12	27	11	38	0	0	3	0	0
2018	Nebraska	12	11	21	7	28	0	2	7	1	0
2019	Nebraska	12	12	30	10	40	1	3	12	2	1

== Professional career ==
=== Pre-draft ===
Jackson was one of four Nebraska players that were invited to the NFL Scouting Combine. After attending the scouting combine he was described as a "matchup-specific depth player that will need to excel on special teams" via thedraftnetwork.com.

Pre-draft measurables
Height	Weight	Arm length	Hand span	Wingspan	40-yard dash	10-yard split	20-yard split	20-yard shuttle	Three-cone drill	Vertical jump	Broad jump	Bench press
6 ft 2 in (1.88 m)	208 lb (94 kg)	32 1/4 in (0.82 m)	9 1/2 in (0.24 m)	6 ft 5 7/8 in (1.98 m)	4.58 s	1.52 s	2.66 s	4.42 s	7.28 s	37.0 in (0.94 m)	10 ft 2 in (3.10 m)	10 reps
All values from NFL Combine/Pro Day

=== New York Jets ===
In the 2020 NFL draft, Jackson went undrafted but signed with the New York Jets on May 6, 2020. He was waived on September 5, and signed to the practice squad the next day. He was elevated to the active roster on October 1 and 10 for the team's weeks 4 and 5 games against the Denver Broncos and Arizona Cardinals, and reverted to the practice squad after each game. He was promoted to the active roster on October 13, 2020.

On August 31, 2021, Jackson was waived by the Jets and re-signed to the practice squad the next day.

=== Chicago Bears ===
Jackson signed a reserve/future contract with the Chicago Bears on January 19, 2022. He made the Bears final roster, playing in five games before being waived on November 27, 2022.

=== Denver Broncos ===
Two days after being waived by the Bears, Jackson signed with the practice squad of the Denver Broncos. He was promoted to the active roster on December 31.

On March 20, 2023, Jackson was waived by the Broncos.

=== Kansas City Chiefs ===
Jackson signed with the Kansas City Chiefs on May 10, 2023. He was waived on August 29 as part of final roster cuts.

=== Carolina Panthers ===
On September 12, 2023, Jackson was signed to the Carolina Panthers practice squad. He signed a reserve/future contract on January 8, 2024. Jackson was waived/injured on August 19.

=== Atlanta Falcons ===
On November 11, 2024, the Atlanta Falcons signed Jackson to their practice squad. He signed a reserve/future contract with Atlanta on January 6, 2025. On August 23, Jackson was waived by the Falcons.

=== Orlando Storm ===
On January 14, 2026, Jackson was selected by the Orlando Storm in the 2026 UFL Draft.

== Personal life ==
Jackson had a son in March 2019.
