= Luke Gifford =

American football player (born 1995)

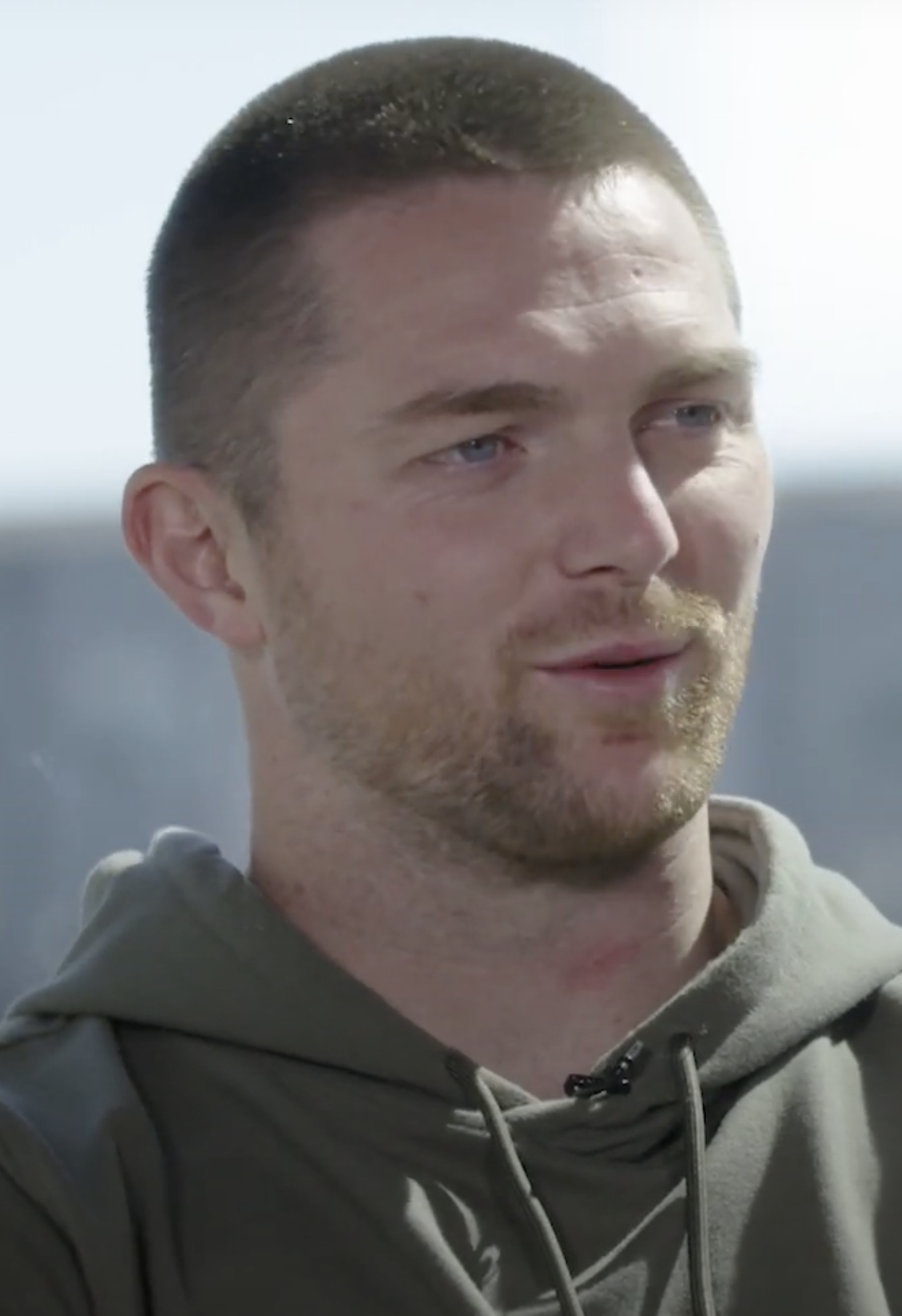
- Gifford in 2023

No. 51 – San Francisco 49ers
- Position: Linebacker
- Roster status: Active

Personal information
- Born: August 28, 1995 (age 31); Lincoln, Nebraska, U.S.
- Listed height: 6 ft 3 in (1.91 m)
- Listed weight: 243 lb (110 kg)

Career information
- High school: Lincoln Southeast (NE)
- College: Nebraska (2014–2018)
- NFL draft: 2019: undrafted

Career history
- Dallas Cowboys (2019–2022); Tennessee Titans (2023–2024); San Francisco 49ers (2025–present)

Awards and highlights
- Pro Bowl (2025)

Career NFL statistics as of 2025
- Total tackles: 130
- Forced fumbles: 1
- Fumble recoveries: 2
- Pass deflections: 3
- Interceptions: 1
- Stats at Pro Football Reference

Luke Gifford (born August 28, 1995) is an American professional football linebacker for the San Francisco 49ers of the National Football League (NFL). He played college football for the Nebraska Cornhuskers and was signed as an undrafted free agent by the Dallas Cowboys in 2019. Gifford has also played for the Tennessee Titans.

== Early life ==
Gifford attended Lincoln Southeast High School, where he was a two-way player as a tight end and safety.

As a sophomore, Gifford contributed to the team winning the 2011 state championship.

As a junior, Gifford received second-team All-Nebraska honors.

As a senior, Gifford was named the starting quarterback.

== College career ==
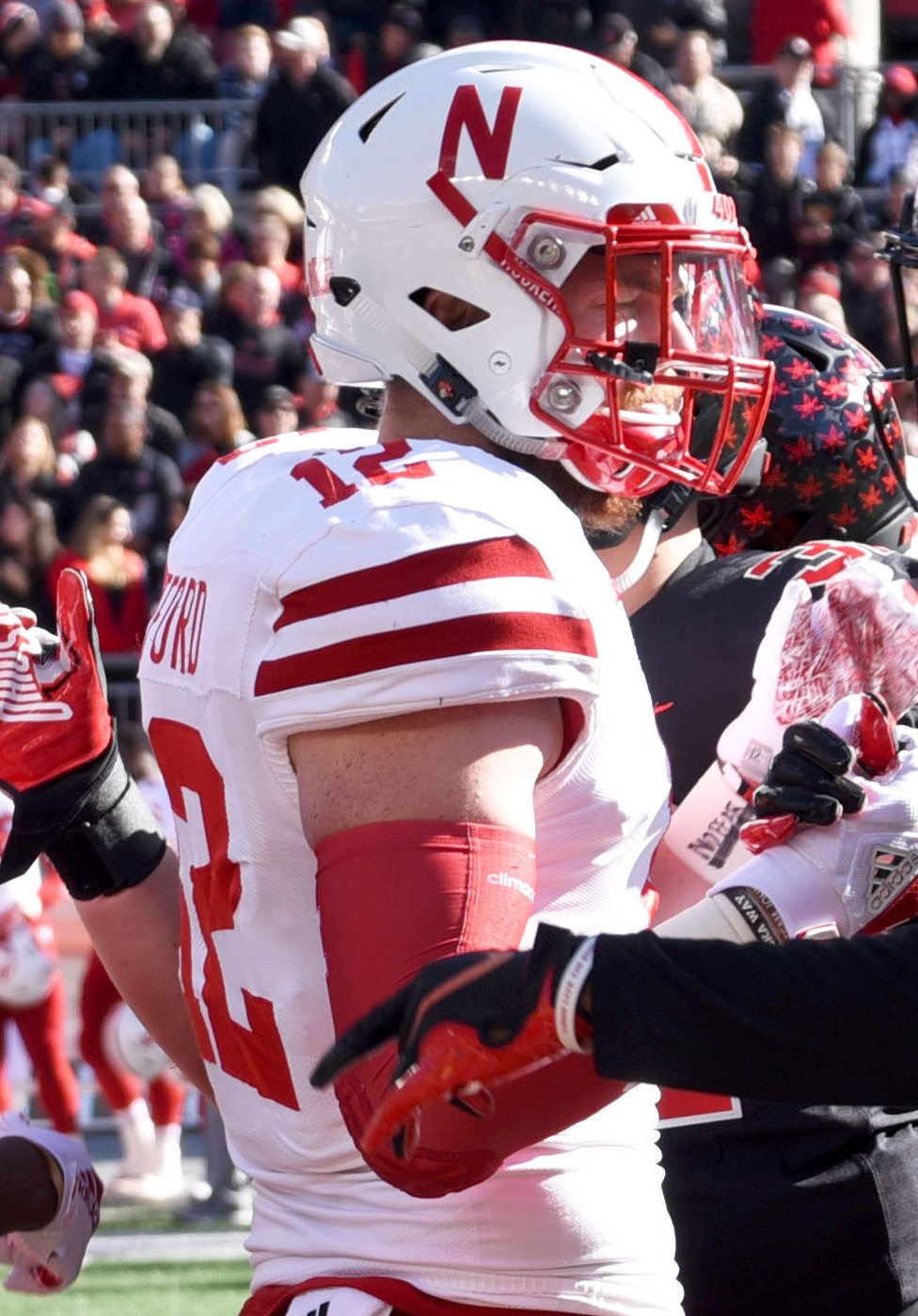
Gifford in 2018

Gifford accepted a football scholarship from University of Nebraska–Lincoln with the intention of playing safety, but was converted into a linebacker.

As a redshirt freshman, Gifford appeared in six games, tallying seven tackles (one for loss) before suffering a season-ending hip injury.

As a sophomore, Gifford appeared in four games as a backup, making only one assisted tackle.

As a junior, Gifford appeared in seven games as a starter at outside linebacker, registering 39 tackles (5 for loss) and 1.5 sacks, until suffering a season-ending hip injury.

As a senior, Gifford appeared in all 12 games, posting 62 tackles, 13 tackles for loss (led the team), 5.5 sacks (led the team), seven quarterback hurries, and a forced fumble.

== Professional career ==
Pre-draft measurables
Height	Weight	Arm length	Hand span	Wingspan	40-yard dash	10-yard split	20-yard split	20-yard shuttle	Three-cone drill	Vertical jump	Broad jump	Bench press
6 ft 3 in (1.91 m)	243 lb (110 kg)	33 in (0.84 m)	9 in (0.23 m)	6 ft 5 3/8 in (1.97 m)	4.68 s	1.64 s	2.68 s	4.21 s	7.10 s	35.0 in (0.89 m)	10 ft 1 in (3.07 m)	23 reps
All values from Pro Day

=== Dallas Cowboys ===
Gifford was signed by the Dallas Cowboys as an undrafted free agent after the 2019 NFL draft on April 30. He suffered a left high ankle sprain in the first preseason game against the San Francisco 49ers, after making an interception, a tackle, and a pass deflection. Even though he was injured, the Cowboys protected Gifford's player rights by keeping him on the regular season roster. Gifford returned to action in Week 6 against the New York Jets and was focused on playing special teams. Three weeks later, he had three special teams tackles against the New York Giants. In Week 15 against the Los Angeles Rams, Gifford suffered a fractured left arm while covering a punt return and was ruled out for the remainder of the season. He was placed on injured reserve on December 17. He appeared in six games and tied for fourth on the team with six special teams tackles.

In 2020, Gifford appeared in eight games, playing mostly on special teams. He was declared inactive for the season opener with a hamstring strain. On November 24, Gifford was suspended two games by the NFL for violating the league's policy on performance-enhancing drugs, forcing him to sit in Week 12 and Week 13. Although Gifford was reinstated from suspension on December 9, the club opted to declared him inactive for two additional games. He finished second on the team with seven special teams tackles.

In 2021, Gifford appeared in 16 games as a backup linebacker and was tied for second on the team with five special teams tackles. He also had six defensive tackles (one for loss). Gifford blocked his first career punt against the New England Patriots. He had a career-high three defensive tackles in the season finale against the Philadelphia Eagles. Gifford was declared inactive for the season opener.

On March 21, 2022, Gifford re-signed with the Cowboys on a one-year contract. He appeared in 16 games as a backup linebacker and led the team with a career-high 12 special teams tackles. Gifford also had five defensive tackles and a forced fumble. He had a career-high five special teams tackles and one fumble recovery against the Green Bay Packers. Gifford tallied two special teams tackles and a forced fumble against the Minnesota Vikings. He missed the third game against the New York Giants with a hamstring injury.

=== Tennessee Titans ===
On March 20, 2023, Gifford signed a two-year contract with the Tennessee Titans. He was limited with injuries and only played in 11 games. Gifford focused mostly on special teams and tallied just eight snaps on defense. On December 23, he was placed on the injured reserve list with a hamstring injury.

On September 3, 2024, the Titans waived Gifford and signed him to their practice squad the following day. Gifford was promoted to the active roster on September 27. He started the season on special teams during the 2024 season, but was elevated to starting linebacker after injuries to Jerome Baker and Kenneth Murray on Week 14, where he tallied 11 tackles. In the next game, Gifford caught his first career interception from Joe Burrow during the opening drive of the loss against the Cincinnati Bengals. Gifford played in 16 games (four starts), finishing with a career high 48 total tackles (31 solo) and two pass deflections.

=== San Francisco 49ers ===
On March 13, 2025, Gifford signed with the San Francisco 49ers. He made 17 appearances (including nine starts) for San Francisco during the regular season, recording one pass deflection, one fumble recovery, and 35 combined tackles.

On March 13, 2026, Gifford re-signed with the 49ers on a two-year, $5.3 million contract.

== NFL career statistics ==
Legend
**Bold**	Career high

=== Regular season ===
Year	Team	Games		Tackles					Interceptions						Fumbles			
Year	Team	GP	GS	Cmb	Solo	Ast	Sck	TFL	Int	Yds	Avg	Lng	TD	PD	FF	FR	Yds	TD
2019	DAL	6	0	6	3	3	0.0	0	0	0	0.0	0	0	0	0	0	0	0
2020	DAL	8	0	6	4	2	0.0	0	0	0	0.0	0	0	0	0	0	0	0
2021	DAL	16	0	11	8	3	0.0	**1**	0	0	0.0	0	0	0	0	0	0	0
2022	DAL	16	0	17	11	6	0.0	0	0	0	0.0	0	0	0	**1**	**1**	0	0
2023	TEN	11	1	6	3	3	0.0	0	0	0	0.0	0	0	0	0	0	0	0
2024	TEN	16	4	**49**	**31**	18	0.0	**1**	**1**	0	0.0	0	0	**2**	0	0	0	0
2025	SF	**17**	**9**	35	12	**23**	0.0	0	0	0	0.0	0	0	1	0	**1**	0	0
Career		90	14	130	72	58	0.0	2	1	0	0.0	0	0	3	1	2	0	0

=== Postseason ===
Year	Team	Games		Tackles					Interceptions						Fumbles			
Year	Team	GP	GS	Cmb	Solo	Ast	Sck	TFL	Int	Yds	Avg	Lng	TD	PD	FF	FR	Yds	TD
2021	DAL	1	0	1	**1**	0	0.0	0	0	0	0.0	0	0	0	0	0	0	0
2022	DAL	**2**	0	**3**	**1**	**2**	0.0	0	0	0	0.0	0	0	0	0	0	0	0
2025	SF	1	0	0	0	0	0.0	0	0	0	0.0	0	0	0	0	0	0	0
Career		4	0	4	2	2	0.0	0	0	0	0.0	0	0	0	0	0	0	0
