= Brenden Jaimes =

American football player (born 1999)

Profile
- Position: Center

Personal information
- Born: May 28, 1999 (age 27); Austin, Texas, U.S.
- Listed height: 6 ft 5 in (1.96 m)
- Listed weight: 300 lb (136 kg)

Career information
- High school: Lake Travis (Austin)
- College: Nebraska (2017–2020)
- NFL draft: 2021: 5th round, 159th overall pick

Career history
- Los Angeles Chargers (2021–2024); Tennessee Titans (2025)*; New England Patriots (2025); New York Giants (2026)*
- * Offseason or practice squad member only

Career NFL statistics as of 2025
- Games played: 49
- Games started: 3
- Stats at Pro Football Reference

Brenden Jaimes (HIGH-miss; born May 28, 1999) is an American professional football center. He played college football for the Nebraska Cornhuskers, and was selected with the 159th pick of the 2021 NFL draft by the Los Angeles Chargers. He has also played for the New England Patriots.

== College career ==
Jaimes was ranked as a three–star recruit by 247Sports.com coming out of Lake Travis High School. He committed to Nebraska on April 16, 2016.

== Professional career ==
Pre-draft measurables
Height	Weight	Arm length	Hand span	Wingspan	40-yard dash	20-yard shuttle	Three-cone drill	Vertical jump	Broad jump	Bench press
6 ft 5 in (1.96 m)	298 lb (135 kg)	32 5/8 in (0.83 m)	9 5/8 in (0.24 m)	6 ft 10 in (2.08 m)	5.25 s	4.50 s	7.46 s	30.5 in (0.77 m)	9 ft 4 in (2.84 m)	25 reps
All values from Pro Day

=== Los Angeles Chargers ===
On May 1, 2021, Jaimes was selected by the Los Angeles Chargers with the 159th pick in the fifth round of the 2021 NFL draft. On May 13, he signed his four-year rookie contract with Los Angeles.

=== Tennessee Titans ===
On April 17, 2025, Jaimes signed with the Tennessee Titans. On August 26, he was released by the Titans as part of final roster cuts.

=== New England Patriots ===
On September 1, 2025, Jaimes was signed to the New England Patriots' practice squad. He was signed to the active roster on December 23. Jaimes was released on December 29, and re-signed to the practice squad.

=== New York Giants ===
On August 7, 2026, Jaimes was signed by the New York Giants, following a tryout several days earlier. He was released by the Giants on August 29.
