= Stanley Morgan Jr. =

American football player (born 1996)

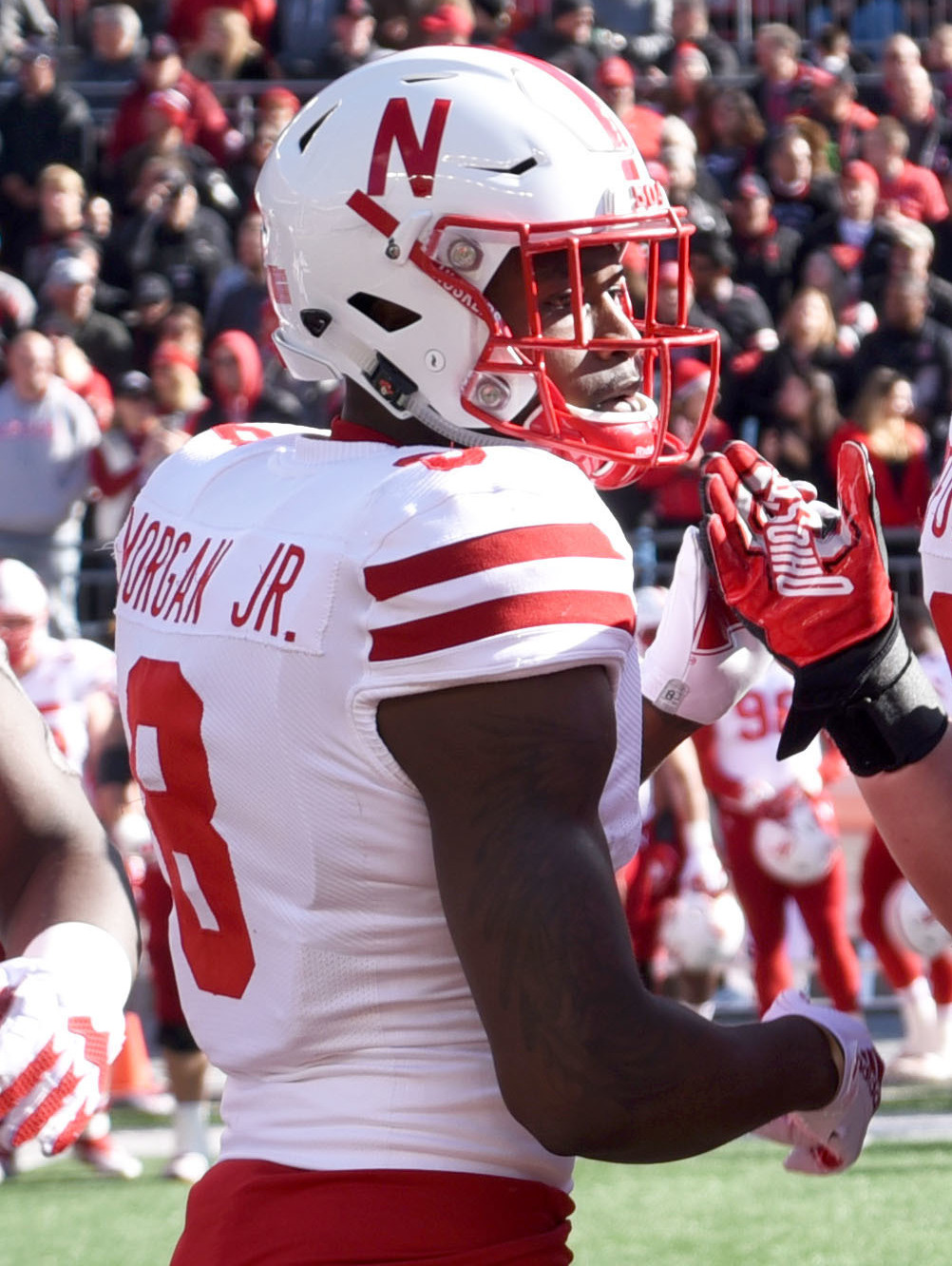
- Morgan with Nebraska in 2018

Profile
- Position: Wide receiver

Personal information
- Born: September 7, 1996 (age 30); New Orleans, Louisiana, U.S.
- Listed height: 6 ft 0 in (1.83 m)
- Listed weight: 205 lb (93 kg)

Career information
- High school: St. Augustine (New Orleans)
- College: Nebraska (2015–2018)
- NFL draft: 2019: undrafted

Career history
- Cincinnati Bengals (2019–2023); New Orleans Saints (2024)*; Tennessee Titans (2024)*
- * Offseason or practice squad member only

Awards and highlights
- Second-team All-Big Ten (2017)

Career NFL statistics as of 2023
- Receptions: 5
- Receiving yards: 29
- Stats at Pro Football Reference

Stanley Morgan Jr. (born September 7, 1996) is an American professional football wide receiver. He played college football for the Nebraska Cornhuskers and signed with the Cincinnati Bengals as an undrafted free agent in 2019.

== Professional career ==
Pre-draft measurables
Height	Weight	Arm length	Hand span	40-yard dash	10-yard split	20-yard split	20-yard shuttle	Three-cone drill	Vertical jump	Broad jump	Bench press
6 ft 0 in (1.83 m)	202 lb (92 kg)	32 3/8 in (0.82 m)	9 7/8 in (0.25 m)	4.53 s	1.58 s	2.66 s	4.13 s	6.78 s	38.5 in (0.98 m)	10 ft 5 in (3.18 m)	14 reps
All values from NFL Combine

=== Cincinnati Bengals ===
==== 2019 ====
Morgan signed with the Cincinnati Bengals as an undrafted free agent following the 2019 NFL draft. He was waived during final roster cuts on August 31, 2019 and signed to the practice squad the next day. He was promoted to the active roster on October 2, 2019.

==== 2020 ====
On September 5, 2020, Morgan was waived by the Bengals and signed to the practice squad the next day. He was elevated to the active roster on November 14 for the team's week 10 game against the Pittsburgh Steelers, and reverted to the practice squad after the game. He was placed on the practice squad/COVID-19 list by the team on November 20, 2020, and restored to the practice squad on December 2. He was elevated again on December 5 for the week 13 game against the Miami Dolphins, and reverted to the practice squad again following the game. He was promoted to the active roster on December 12, 2020.

==== 2021 ====
Morgan's main role for the Bengals in 2021 was as the team's primary gunner on kickoffs and punts, as well as a lead blocking wide receiver on running plays. Morgan finished the 2021 season with two receptions for 11 yards. In Week 15 against the San Francisco 49ers, Morgan returned two kickoffs for a combined 22 yards.

==== 2022 ====
On March 28, 2022, the Bengals re-signed Morgan to a two-year contract that runs through the 2023 season. He continued his role as the team's primary gunner and blocking wide receiver. In Week 5 against the Baltimore Ravens, Morgan was targeted in the redzone, for what would have been a go-ahead touchdown, though the pass was successfully deflected by Marcus Peters and Calais Campbell. This was Morgan's only receiving target of the season.

==== 2023 ====
Morgan was released by the Bengals on August 29, 2023 as part of their final 53-man roster cutdown and re-signed to the practice squad the following day. His contract expired when the team's season ended January 7, 2024.

=== New Orleans Saints ===
On March 15, 2024, Morgan signed with the New Orleans Saints. Morgan was waived as a part of final roster cuts on August 27, 2024.

=== Tennessee Titans ===
On November 26, 2024, Morgan was signed to the Tennessee Titans practice squad. He signed a reserve/future contract on January 6, 2025.

On April 16, 2025, Morgan was released by the Titans.
