= Jack Stoll =

American football player (born 1998)

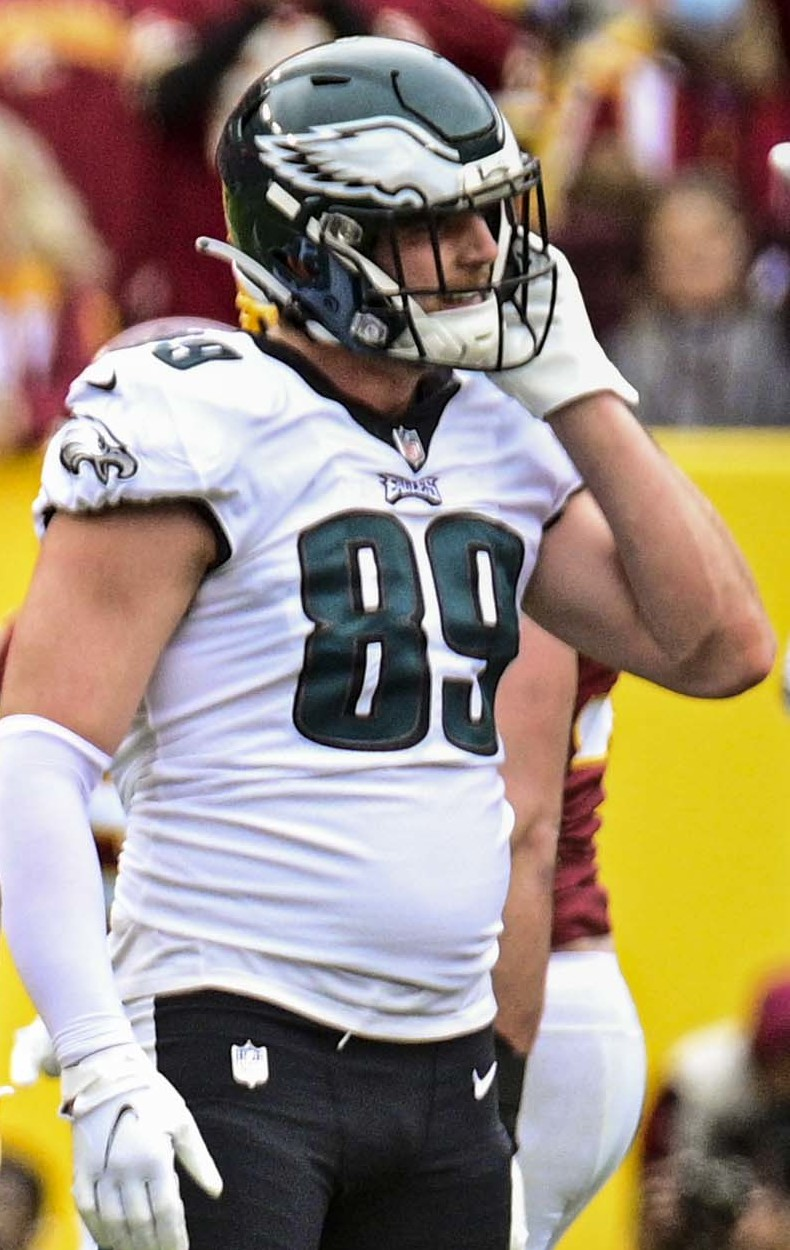
- Stoll with the Philadelphia Eagles in 2022

No. 83 – San Francisco 49ers
- Position: Tight end
- Roster status: Practice squad

Personal information
- Born: January 28, 1998 (age 28); Lone Tree, Colorado, U.S.
- Listed height: 6 ft 4 in (1.93 m)
- Listed weight: 245 lb (111 kg)

Career information
- High school: Regis Jesuit (Aurora, Colorado)
- College: Nebraska (2016–2020)
- NFL draft: 2021: undrafted

Career history
- Philadelphia Eagles (2021–2023); New York Giants (2024)*; Philadelphia Eagles (2024); Miami Dolphins (2024); New Orleans Saints (2025); Cleveland Browns (2026)*; San Francisco 49ers (2026–present)
- * Offseason or practice squad member only

Career NFL statistics as of 2025
- Receptions: 28
- Receiving yards: 239
- Receiving touchdowns: 1
- Stats at Pro Football Reference

Jack Stoll (born January 28, 1998) is an American professional football tight end for the San Francisco 49ers of the National Football League (NFL). Stoll played college football for the Nebraska Cornhuskers and was signed by the Eagles as an undrafted free agent following the 2021 NFL draft.

== Early life ==
Jack Stoll was born on January 28, 1998, and grew up in Lone Tree, Colorado. He went to high school at Regis Jesuit High School, earning all-state honors his senior year. He caught 32 catches for 434 yards with 6 touchdowns, while also being named Blue-Grey All-American. Stoll was ranked 9th in the nation among tight ends by ESPN.com. He received scholarship offers from Air Force, Colorado, Colorado State, New Mexico, Texas and Wyoming but instead chose Nebraska.

Stoll redshirted his first year at Nebraska. In his second year, he played in 12 games as a freshman redshirt, catching 8 passes for 89 yards and scoring two touchdowns. He started in all 12 games his sophomore year, and led all Cornhusker tight ends with 21 receptions for 245 yards and three touchdowns. He would start every game in his junior year as well, with 25 catches for 234 yards. Stoll battled injuries in his senior year, only playing in 7 games, starting one. He chose to forgo remaining eligibility and instead declared for the 2021 NFL draft.

== Professional career ==
Pre-draft measurables
| Height | Weight | Arm length | Hand span | Wingspan | 40-yard dash | 10-yard split | 20-yard split | 20-yard shuttle | Three-cone drill | Vertical jump | Broad jump | Bench press |
|---|---|---|---|---|---|---|---|---|---|---|---|---|
| 6 ft 3 3/4 in (1.92 m) | 247 lb (112 kg) | 33 1/8 in (0.84 m) | 10 in (0.25 m) | 6 ft 9 1/2 in (2.07 m) | 4.60 s | 1.64 s | 2.66 s | 4.32 s | 6.86 s | 31.5 in (0.80 m) | 9 ft 11 in (3.02 m) | 16 reps |
All values from the Nebraska Pro Day

=== Philadelphia Eagles ===
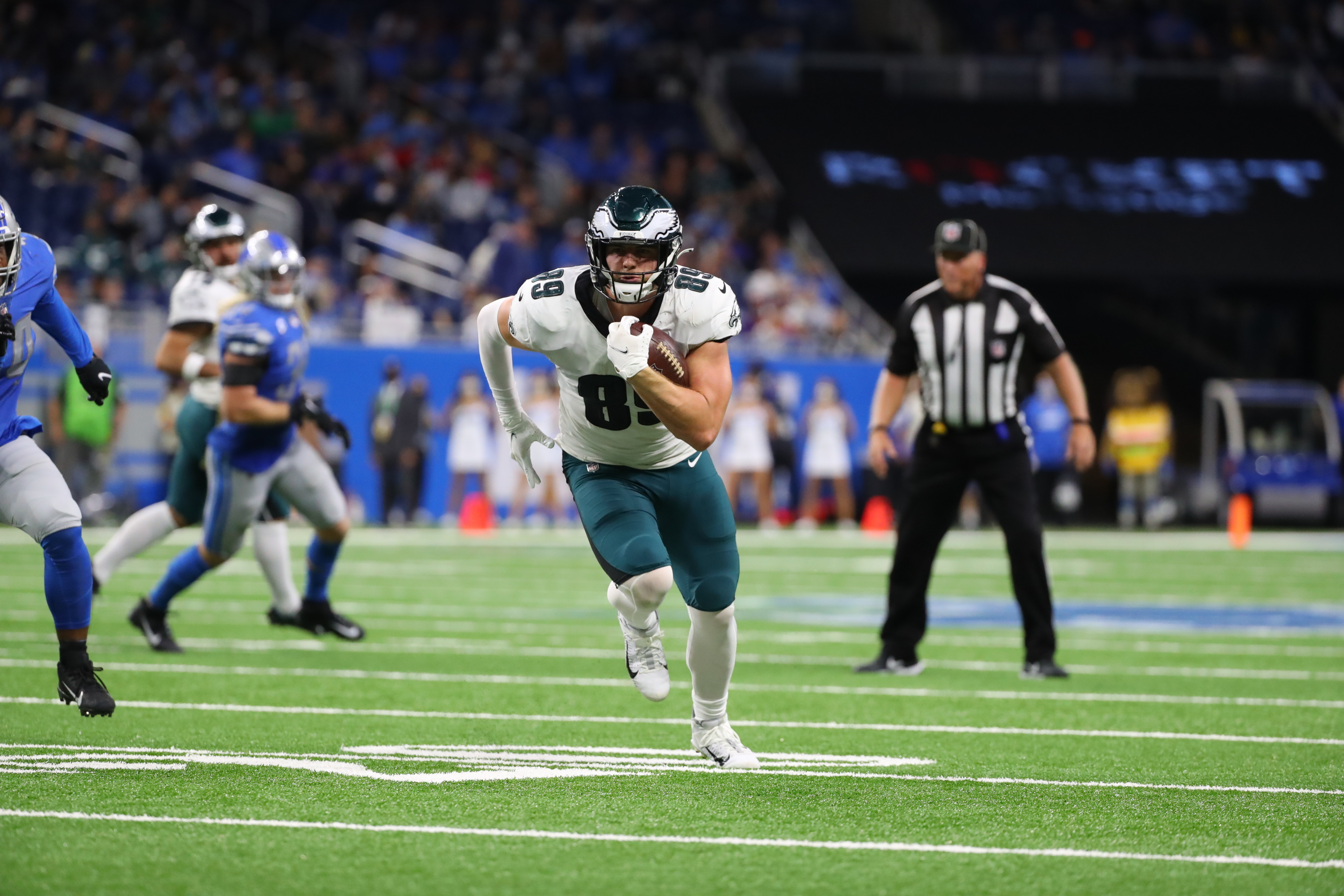
Stoll running with the football

Stoll went unselected in the draft and was subsequently signed by the Philadelphia Eagles. He was reportedly given the largest contract of the Eagles' undrafted free agents. Stoll was kept at roster cuts, becoming the only 2021 undrafted free agent to make the Eagles' roster. He made his debut in week one, appearing on 12 offensive snaps during the 32–6 win over the Atlanta Falcons. He was placed on the COVID list on January 3, 2022. He was activated one week later on January 10, missing just one game where the Eagles did not play their starters as they had already clinched a playoff spot.

After posting four receptions for 22 yards in his rookie year, Stoll started 11 games in 2022 and recorded 11 catches for 123 yards. Stoll reached Super Bowl LVII. In the Super Bowl, Stoll recorded one tackle on special teams but the Eagles lost 38–35 to the Kansas City Chiefs. He started 10 games in the 2023 season and posted five receptions for 38 yards, along with one tackle on special teams.

=== New York Giants ===
On March 15, 2024, Stoll signed with the New York Giants. He was released on August 27 as part of final roster cuts.

=== Philadelphia Eagles (second stint) ===
On August 28, 2024, Stoll was signed to the Philadelphia Eagles practice squad. He was promoted to the active roster on September 24. He was waived on November 12.

=== Miami Dolphins ===
On November 13, 2024, Stoll was claimed off waivers by the Miami Dolphins.

=== New Orleans Saints ===
On March 13, 2025, Stoll signed with the New Orleans Saints. He was released on August 26 as part of final roster cuts and re-signed to the practice squad the next day. Stoll was promoted to the active roster on September 9. In Week 3 against the Seattle Seahawks, Stoll scored his first career touchdown on a 13-yard pass from Spencer Rattler. He made 15 appearances (including four starts) for the Saints, recording six receptions for 46 yards and one touchdown. On January 2, 2026, Stoll was placed on season-ending injured reserve due to a knee injury suffered in Week 17 against the Tennessee Titans.

=== Cleveland Browns ===
On March 11, 2026, Stoll signed with the Cleveland Browns. He was placed on injured reserve on August 20. Stoll was released by Cleveland with an injury settlement on August 28.

=== San Francisco 49ers ===
On September 15, 2026, Stoll signed with the San Francisco 49ers' practice squad.

== NFL career statistics ==
=== Regular season ===
| Year | Team | Games | | Receiving | | | | | Rushing | | | | | Fumbles | |
| Year | Team | GP | GS | Rec | Yds | Avg | Lng | TD | Att | Yds | Avg | Lng | TD | Fum | Lost |
|---|---|---|---|---|---|---|---|---|---|---|---|---|---|---|---|
| 2021 | PHI | 16 | 5 | 4 | 22 | 5.5 | 9 | 0 | – | – | – | – | – | 0 | 0 |
| 2022 | PHI | 17 | 11 | 11 | 123 | 11.2 | 26 | 0 | – | – | – | – | – | 0 | 0 |
| 2023 | PHI | 17 | 10 | 5 | 38 | 7.6 | 14 | 0 | – | – | – | – | – | 0 | 0 |
| 2024 | PHI | 7 | 2 | 2 | 10 | 5.0 | 6 | 0 | – | – | – | – | – | 0 | 0 |
| 2024 | MIA | 4 | 0 | 0 | 0 | 0 | 0 | 0 | – | – | – | – | – | 0 | 0 |
| 2025 | NO | 15 | 4 | 6 | 46 | 7.7 | 13 | 1 | – | – | – | – | – | 0 | 0 |
| Career | | 76 | 32 | 28 | 239 | 8.5 | 26 | 1 | 0 | 0 | 0 | 0 | 0 | 0 | 0 |

=== Postseason ===
| Year | Team | Games | | Receiving | | | | | Rushing | | | | | Fumbles | |
| Year | Team | GP | GS | Rec | Yds | Avg | Lng | TD | Att | Yds | Avg | Lng | TD | Fum | Lost |
|---|---|---|---|---|---|---|---|---|---|---|---|---|---|---|---|
| 2021 | PHI | 1 | 0 | – | – | – | – | – | – | – | – | – | – | 0 | 0 |
| 2022 | PHI | 3 | 0 | 1 | 5 | 5.0 | 5 | 0 | – | – | – | – | – | 0 | 0 |
| 2023 | PHI | 1 | 0 | – | – | – | – | – | – | – | – | – | – | 0 | 0 |
| Career | | 4 | 0 | 1 | 5 | 5.0 | 5 | 0 | 0 | 0 | 0.0 | 0 | 0 | 0 | 0 |
