= Freedom Akinmoladun =

American football player (born 1996)

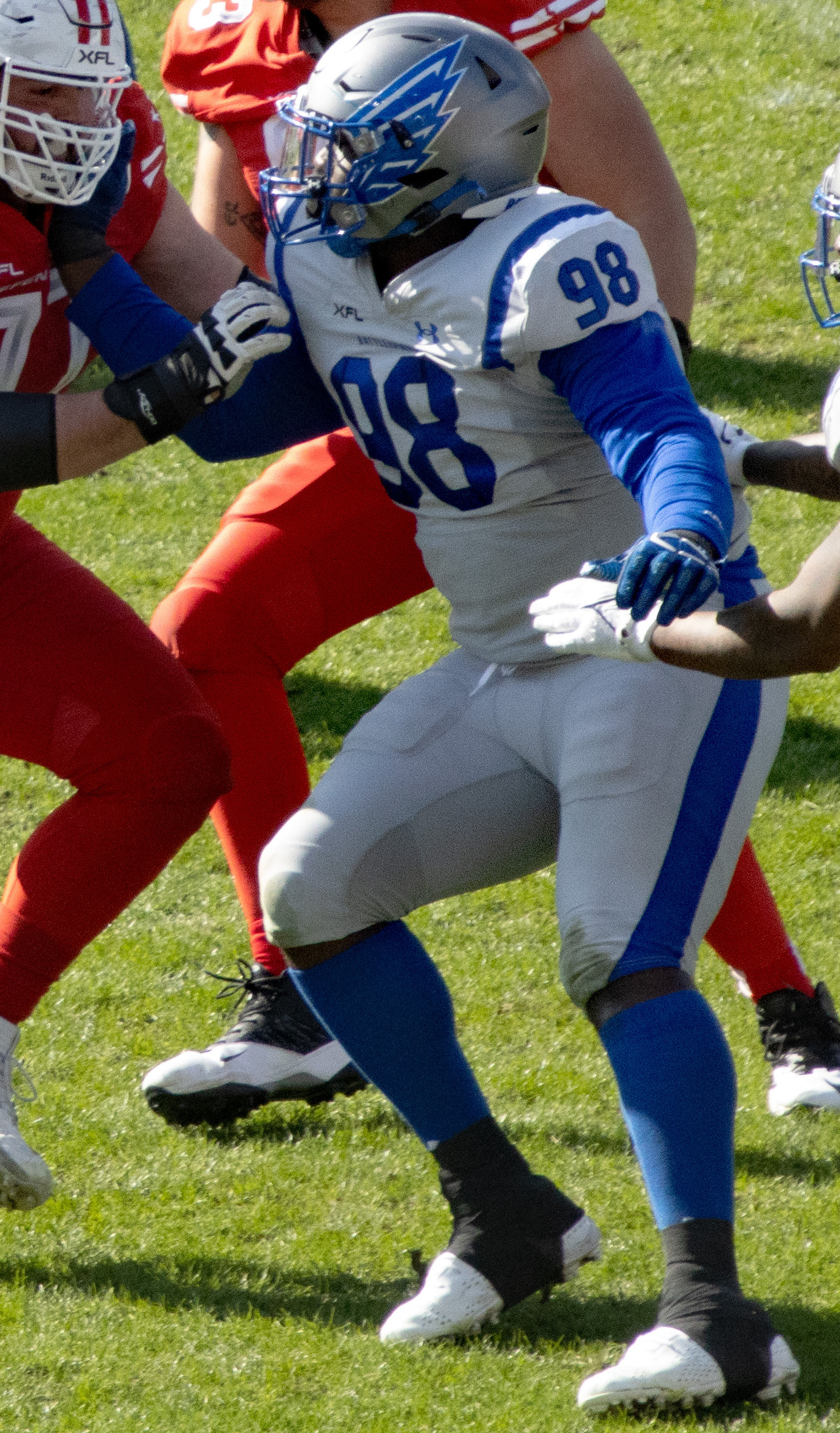
- Akinmoladun with the St. Louis BattleHawks in 2023

No. 91 – Omaha Beef
- Position: Defensive end
- Roster status: Active

Personal information
- Born: February 11, 1996 (age 30); Grandview, Missouri, U.S.
- Listed height: 6 ft 3 in (1.91 m)
- Listed weight: 286 lb (130 kg)

Career information
- High school: Grandview
- College: Nebraska
- NFL draft: 2019: undrafted

Career history
- New York Giants (2019)*; Cincinnati Bengals (2019–2020); Tennessee Titans (2021)*; New York Jets (2021); Philadelphia Stars (2022); St. Louis BattleHawks (2023–2025); Omaha Beef (2026–present)
- * Offseason or practice squad member only

Career NFL statistics
- Games played: 4
- Total tackles: 2
- Stats at Pro Football Reference

Freedom Akinmoladun (born February 11, 1996) is an American professional football defensive end. He was signed by the New York Giants as an undrafted free agent in 2019 following his college football career with the Nebraska Cornhuskers.

== Professional career ==
=== New York Giants ===
Akinmoladun signed with the New York Giants as an undrafted free agent following the 2019 NFL draft on May 14, 2019. He was waived during final roster cuts on August 31, 2019, and signed to the team's practice squad the next day. He was released on November 12, 2019.

=== Cincinnati Bengals ===
Akinmoladun signed to the Cincinnati Bengals' practice squad on November 19, 2019. He was promoted to the active roster on December 14, 2019. He appeared in two games for the Bengals in the 2019 season, Weeks 16 and 17.

Akinmoladun was waived during final roster cuts on September 5, 2020, and signed to the team's practice squad the next day. He was elevated to the team's active roster on September 17 for the team's week 2 game against the Cleveland Browns and reverted to the practice squad the next day. He was elevated again to the team's active roster on October 3 for the week 4 game against the Jacksonville Jaguars, and reverted to the practice squad after the game. He was placed on the practice squad/COVID-19 list by the team on November 18, 2020, and restored to the practice squad on December 2. He signed a reserve/future contract on January 4, 2021. He was waived on August 22, 2021.

=== Tennessee Titans ===
On August 24, 2021, Akinmoladun was claimed off waivers by the Tennessee Titans. He was waived on August 29, 2021.

=== New York Jets ===
On December 21, 2021, Akinmoladun was signed to the New York Jets practice squad. He appeared in one game, which was Week 16 against the Jaguars, for the Jets in the 2021 season.

=== Philadelphia Stars ===
Akinmoladun was selected with the sixth pick of the second round of the 2022 USFL draft by the Philadelphia Stars.

=== St. Louis BattleHawks ===
The St. Louis BattleHawks selected Akinmoladun in the first round of the 2023 XFL Supplemental Draft on January 1, 2023. He re-signed with the team on January 31, 2024. He was released on March 19, 2026.

=== Omaha Beef ===
Akinmoladun was signed by the Omaha Beef of the National Arena League on May 7, 2026.

== Personal life ==
Freedom's older brother, Olu'Kayode Akinmoladun, played college football at Nebraska–Kearney before going on to play professionally for various indoor football teams, including the Green Bay Blizzard, Texas Revolution, and Omaha Beef; additionally, Freedom's younger brother, Justice Akinmoladun, was playing college football at Washburn as of 2022.
