= Devine Ozigbo =

American football player (born 1996)

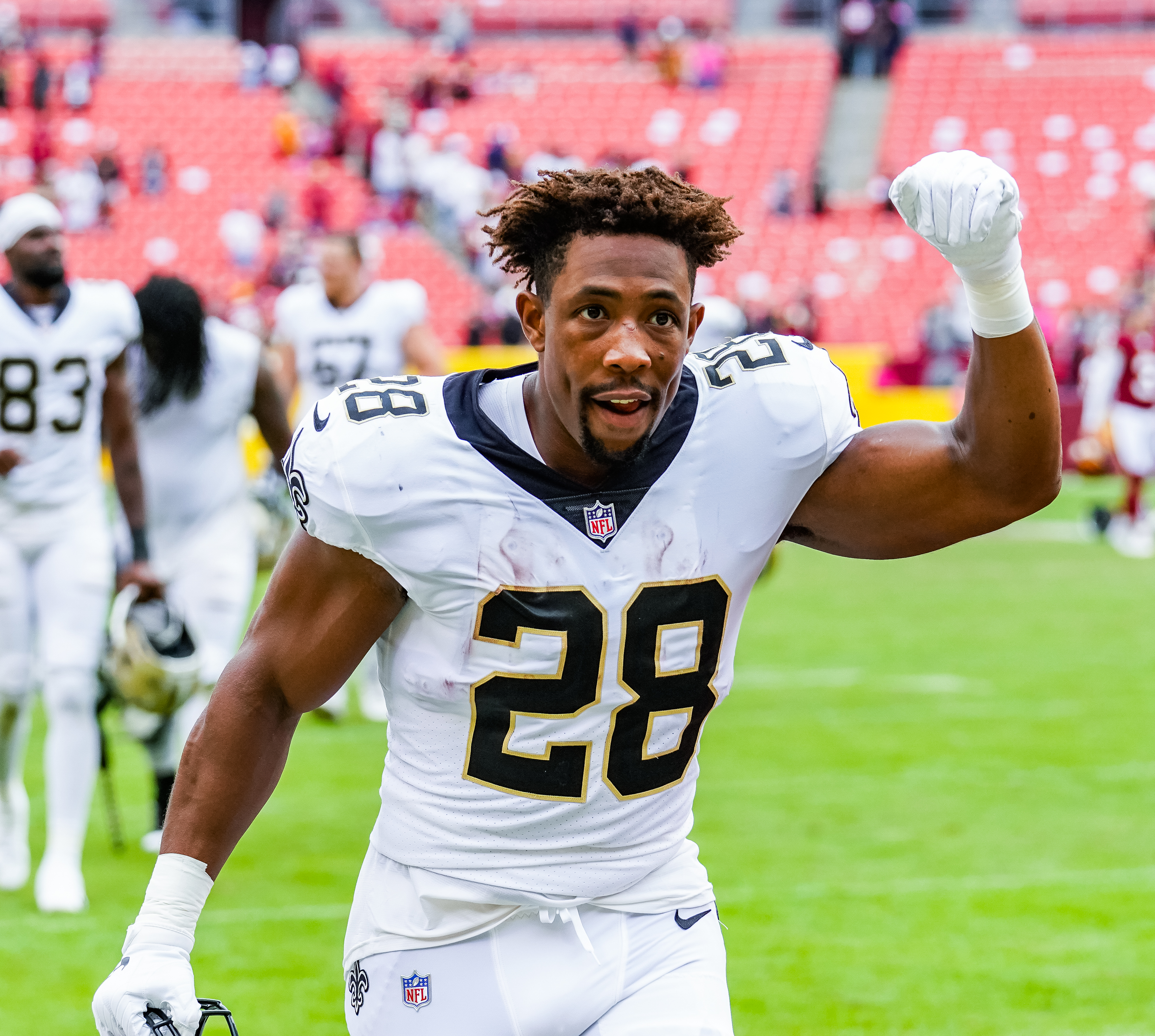
- Ozigbo with the New Orleans Saints in 2021

Profile
- Position: Running back

Personal information
- Born: October 2, 1996 (age 30); Sachse, Texas, U.S.
- Listed height: 5 ft 11 in (1.80 m)
- Listed weight: 225 lb (102 kg)

Career information
- High school: Sachse
- College: Nebraska (2015–2018)
- NFL draft: 2019: undrafted

Career history
- New Orleans Saints (2019)*; Jacksonville Jaguars (2019–2021); New Orleans Saints (2021); Jacksonville Jaguars (2021); New England Patriots (2021–2022)*; New Orleans Saints (2022)*; Denver Broncos (2022); Detroit Lions (2023)
- * Offseason or practice squad member only

Career NFL statistics as of 2023
- Rushing yards: 34
- Rushing average: 2
- Receptions: 15
- Receiving yards: 83
- Stats at Pro Football Reference

Devine Eghosa Ozigbo (born October 2, 1996) is an American professional football running back. He played college football for the Nebraska Cornuhuskers and signed with the New Orleans Saints as an undrafted free agent in 2019.

== Early life ==
Ozigbo attended and played high school football at Sachse High School. He is of Nigerian descent.

== College career ==
Ozigbo played at Nebraska from 2015 to 2018. During his collegiate career, he rushed for 2,196 yards on 419 carries with 21 touchdowns.

== Professional career ==
Pre-draft measurables
Height	Weight	Arm length	Hand span	40-yard dash	10-yard split	20-yard split	20-yard shuttle	Three-cone drill	Vertical jump	Broad jump	Bench press
5 ft 10 3/4 in (1.80 m)	222 lb (101 kg)	31 in (0.79 m)	9 1/4 in (0.23 m)	4.65 s	1.62 s	2.65 s	4.27 s	6.95 s	37.0 in (0.94 m)	10 ft 4 in (3.15 m)	19 reps
All values from Pro Day

=== New Orleans Saints (first stint) ===
Ozigbo signed with the New Orleans Saints as an undrafted free agent in 2019.

=== Jacksonville Jaguars (first stint) ===
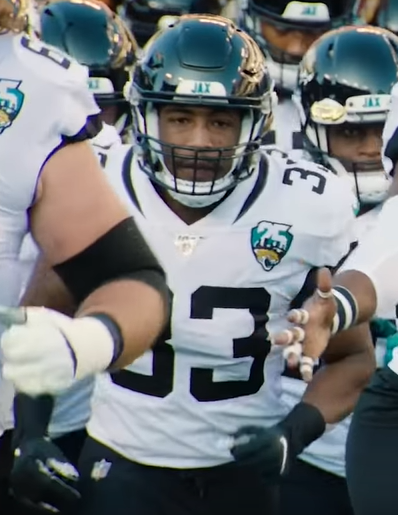
Ozigbo playing for the Jaguars in 2019

On September 1, 2019, Ozigbo was claimed off waivers by the Jacksonville Jaguars. In Week 17 of the 2019 season, he recorded his first significant statistics in the NFL with nine carries for 27 rushing yards and three receptions for 23 receiving yards in the 38–20 victory over the Indianapolis Colts.

On September 10, 2020, Ozigbo was placed on injured reserve. He was activated on October 24.

On August 31, 2021, Ozigbo was waived by the Jaguars and re-signed to the practice squad the next day.

=== New Orleans Saints (second stint) ===
On October 6, 2021, Ozigbo was signed by the New Orleans Saints off the Jaguars practice squad. He was waived on October 30, 2021.

=== Jacksonville Jaguars (second stint) ===
On November 1, 2021, Ozigbo was claimed off waivers by the Jacksonville Jaguars. He was waived on November 27, 2021.

=== New England Patriots ===
On November 30, 2021, Ozigbo was signed to the New England Patriots practice squad. He signed a reserve/future contract with the Patriots on January 17, 2022.

One May 2, 2022, the New England Patriots released Ozigbo from his contract, making him a free agent.

=== New Orleans Saints (third stint) ===
On May 16, 2022, Ozigbo signed with the New Orleans Saints. He was waived on August 21, 2022.

=== Denver Broncos ===
On August 22, 2022, Ozigbo was claimed off waivers by the Denver Broncos. He was waived on August 30, 2022 and signed to the practice squad the next day. He was promoted to the active roster on October 29, but waived three days later and re-signed back to the practice squad. He was promoted back to the active roster on November 26. He was released on December 27.

=== Detroit Lions ===
On August 9, 2023, Ozigbo signed with the Detroit Lions. On August 27, 2023, Ozigbo was released. He was re-signed to the practice squad on September 20, then promoted back to the active roster on October 30. He was waived on November 2 and re-signed to the practice squad four days later. He was released on November 14, 2023.
