= Billy McCaffrey =

American basketball player (born 1971)

Personal information
- Born: May 30, 1971 (age 55) Allentown, Pennsylvania, U.S.
- Listed height: 6 ft 3 in (1.91 m)
- Listed weight: 175 lb (79 kg)

Career information
- High school: Allentown Central Catholic (Allentown, Pennsylvania)
- College: Duke (1989–1991); Vanderbilt (1992–1994)
- NBA draft: 1994: undrafted
- Position: Point guard / shooting guard

Career highlights
- NBL champion (1996); NCAA champion (1991); Consensus second-team All-American (1993); SEC Co-Player of the Year (1993); 2× First-team All-SEC (1993, 1994); McDonald's All-American (1989); Fourth-team Parade All-American (1989)

Billy McCaffrey (born May 30, 1971) is an American former basketball player. He is also the former interim head coach at St. Bonaventure University.

== Early life and education ==
McCaffrey attended Allentown Central Catholic High School in Allentown, Pennsylvania, where he played in the 1989 McDonald's All-American Game.

=== Collegiate basketball career ===
McCaffrey began his college basketball career at Duke University. As a sophomore, he was the team's second leading scorer during its 1991 NCAA championship season. He scored 16 points in the 1991 title game win over Kansas. McCaffrey then sat out the 1991–92 season as he transferred to Vanderbilt University.

As a Commodore, McCaffrey was named a two-time All-American. A 6'3" shooting guard, he averaged 20.6 points in both his seasons at Vanderbilt, leading the school to a high national ranking of number 5, an SEC regular season title with a 14–2 record, and number 3 regional seed in the 1993 NCAA Division I men's basketball tournament where Vanderbilt lost in the Sweet 16s to Temple. His 20.6-point average and .464 three-point field goal percentage ranks second all time in school history, and he is first in career free throw percentage at 88%. He also holds the Vanderbilt record for most assists in a game, 14, recorded January 13, 1993 against Kentucky. He shared SEC Player of the Year honors with Jamal Mashburn in 1993.

Following his college career, he went on to play five seasons of professional basketball in Italy, Germany and Australia. He played the 1996 season with the South East Melbourne Magic of the NBL.

== Coaching career ==
McCaffrey was an assistant coach with St. Bonaventure University from 2001 to 2003 under his coach as a senior at Vanderbilt, Jan van Breda Kolff, and interim head coach in 2003, though he never coached a game in the 2003 season. He was a University of Maine assistant coach for the 2003–04 season.

== Personal life ==
McCaffrey's older brother Ed was a National Football League wide receiver for the New York Giants, San Francisco 49ers, and Denver Broncos who won three Super Bowls, and was also a standout athlete at Allentown Central Catholic High School and Stanford University.

His nephews are Max, Christian, Dylan, and Luke.
