= Christian McCaffrey =

American football player (born 1996)

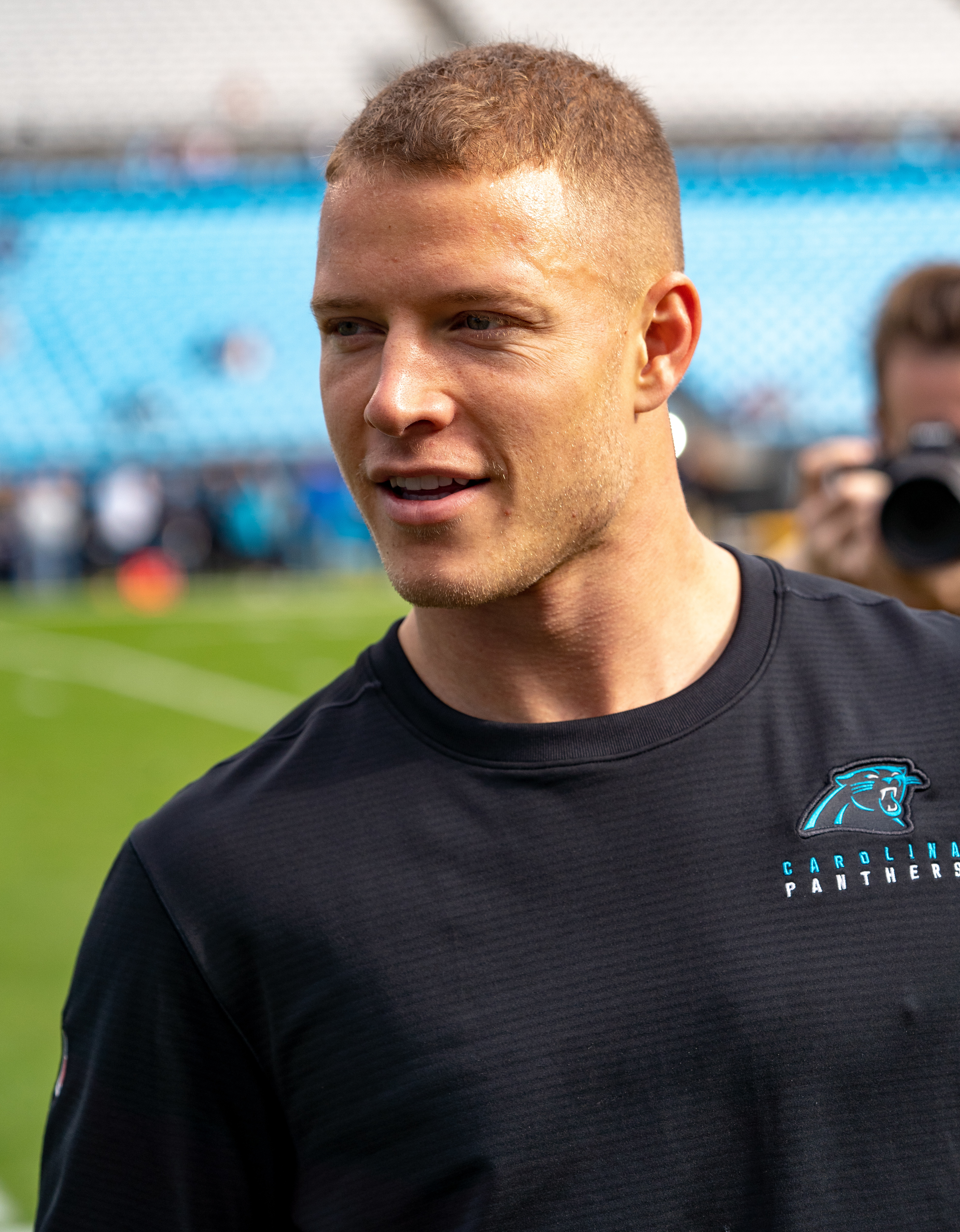
- McCaffrey with the Carolina Panthers in 2019

No. 23 – San Francisco 49ers
- Position: Running back
- Roster status: Active

Personal information
- Born: June 7, 1996 (age 30); Castle Rock, Colorado, U.S.
- Listed height: 5 ft 11 in (1.80 m)
- Listed weight: 210 lb (95 kg)

Career information
- High school: Valor Christian (Highlands Ranch, Colorado)
- College: Stanford (2014–2016)
- NFL draft: 2017: 1st round, 8th overall pick

Career history
- Carolina Panthers (2017–2022); San Francisco 49ers (2022–present)

Awards and highlights
- NFL Offensive Player of the Year (2023); NFL Comeback Player of the Year (2025); 4× First-team All-Pro (2019 (Note: Selected as a running back and the flex), 2023, 2025 (Note: Selected as the all purpose)); Second-team All-Pro (2018 (Note: Selected as the flex)); 4× Pro Bowl (2019, 2022, 2023, 2025); NFL rushing yards leader (2023); Paul Hornung Award (2015); Jet Award (2015); AP College Football Player of the Year (2015); Consensus All-American (2015); Pac-12 Offensive Player of the Year (2015); 2× First-team All-Pac-12 (2015, 2016); NCAA (FBS) records: Most career all-purpose yards: 6,987; Most all-purpose yards in a season: 3,864 (2015)

Career NFL statistics as of Week 10, 2026
- Rushing yards: 8,108
- Rushing average: 4.6
- Rushing touchdowns: 72
- Receptions: 666
- Receiving yards: 5,821
- Receiving touchdowns: 39
- Stats at Pro Football Reference

Christian Jackson McCaffrey (born June 7, 1996) is an American professional football running back for the San Francisco 49ers of the National Football League (NFL). He played college football for the Stanford Cardinal and was selected by the Carolina Panthers eighth overall in the 2017 NFL draft. As a sophomore in 2015, McCaffrey was named AP College Football Player of the Year and was a finalist for the Heisman Trophy. He holds the NCAA record for most all-purpose yards in a season (3,864).

McCaffrey holds numerous NFL and Panthers franchise records and is one of three players ever to record 1,000 rushing and 1,000 receiving yards in the same season, doing so in 2019. McCaffrey was traded to the 49ers in 2022 and was named the 2023 Offensive Player of the Year after leading the league in scrimmage yards and touchdowns en route to an NFC Championship and an appearance in Super Bowl LVIII. A member of the McCaffrey football family, he is the son of Ed and brother of Max, Dylan, and Luke.

== Early life ==
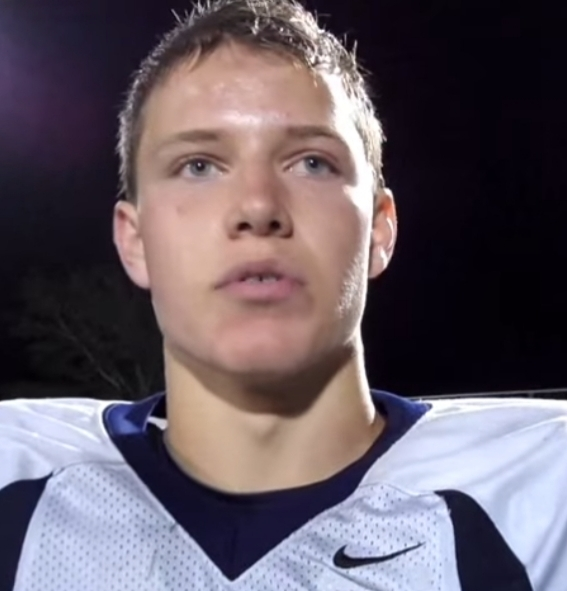
McCaffrey playing at Valor Christian High School, 2012

McCaffrey was born in Castle Rock, Colorado, on June 7, 1996, the son of former Stanford and NFL wide receiver Ed McCaffrey and former Stanford soccer player Lisa McCaffrey. He attended Regis Jesuit High School in Aurora, Colorado for his freshman year and then Valor Christian High School in Highlands Ranch, Colorado under coach Brent Vieselmeyer for the rest of his high school career. He played running back, wide receiver, cornerback, and punter. He broke numerous Colorado high school records including career total touchdowns (141), career all purpose yards (8,845), career touchdown receptions (47), and single season all-purpose yards (3,032). He was the Gatorade Football Player of the Year for Colorado in both 2012 and 2013. He also played basketball.

McCaffrey was also a standout sprinter on the track and field team. As a sophomore, he placed second in the 100-meter dash at the Mountain Vista Boulder Invitational with a wind-assisted (+6.2 m/s) career-best time of 10.75 seconds. As a junior in 2013, he finished sixth in the 100-meter dash (10.89s) and ninth in the 200-meter dash (22.17s) at the CHSAA State Meet.

Considered one of the best one hundred football players in his national high school class, he was selected as a 2014 U.S. Army All-American. He was rated by Rivals.com as a four-star recruit and was ranked as the third best all-purpose back in his class and 77th best player overall. He committed to Stanford University to play college football.

== College career ==
=== Freshman year ===
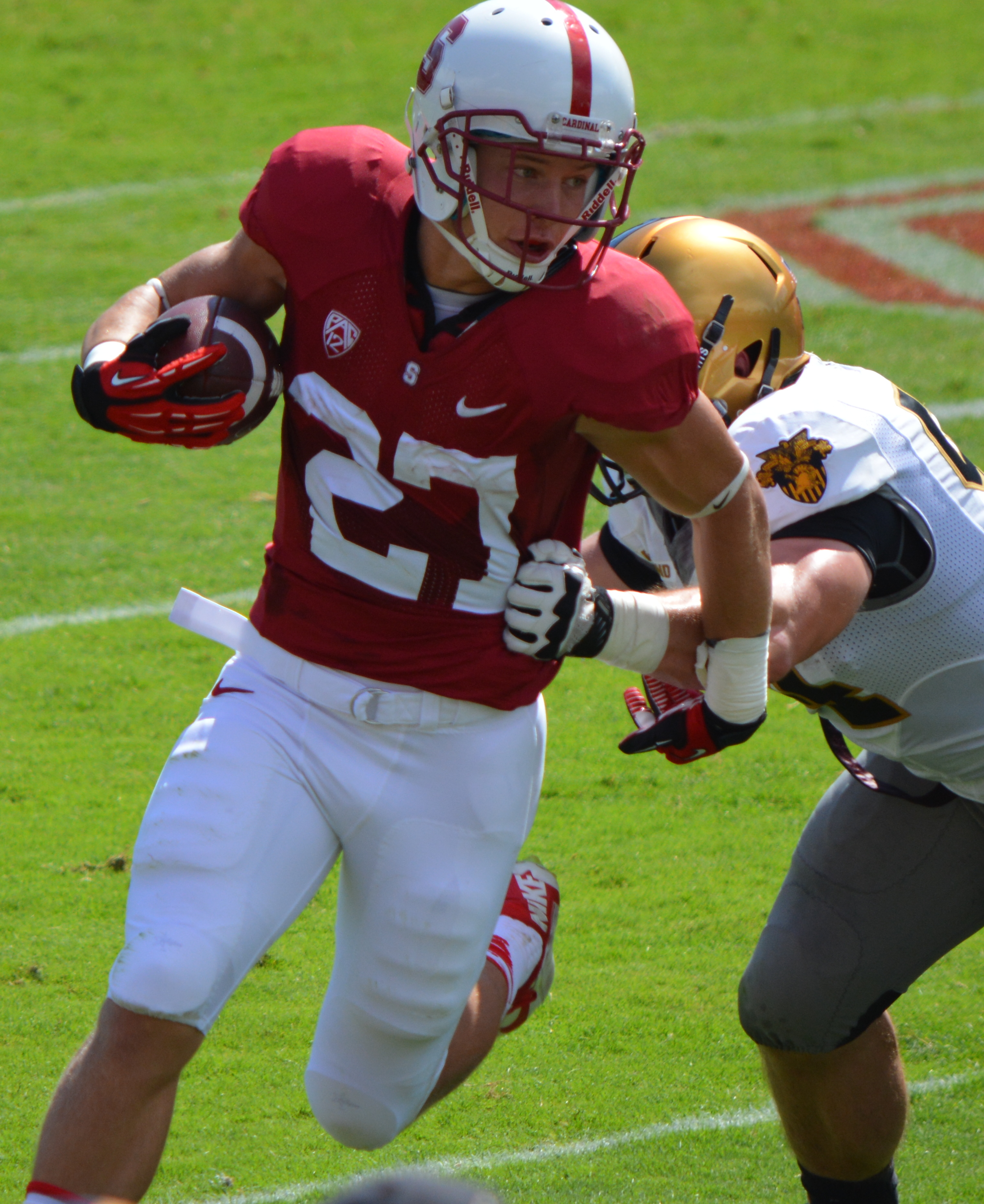
McCaffrey in 2014

McCaffrey played in all 13 games as a true freshman for the Cardinal in 2014. He shared the backfield with Remound Wright, Barry J. Sanders, and Kelsey Young. In his collegiate debut, he had a 52-yard receiving touchdown against UC Davis. He finished the year with 300 rushing yards on 43 carries and 251 receiving yards on 17 receptions with two total touchdowns.

=== Sophomore year ===
McCaffrey had a breakout sophomore season in 2015. He surpassed Barry Sanders' NCAA record of 3,250 all-purpose yards, finishing with 3,864. McCaffrey ranked second in the nation with 2,019 rushing yards, becoming the first Stanford player to rush for 2,000 in a season. He also set numerous other Stanford records during the season including rushing yards in a single game (243) and all-purpose yards in a game (461).

McCaffrey was a consensus All-American and was the Associated Press College Football Player of the Year, Pac-12 Player of the Year, and Paul Hornung Award winner. He also finished second to Alabama's Derrick Henry in the 2015 Heisman Trophy voting.

He set the school record for all purpose yards in a single game in the Pac-12 Championship against USC with 461 total yards.

During the 2016 Rose Bowl against Iowa, McCaffrey became the first player to rush for over 100 yards (172) and have over 100 yards receiving (109) in a Rose Bowl game. Overall, he set a new Rose Bowl record with 368 all-purpose yards, breaking the previous record set in 2012 by Wisconsin's Jared Abbrederis.

=== Junior year ===
Through the end of the 2016 regular season, McCaffrey led the nation in all purpose yards (211.6 yards per game). He led the Pac-12 Conference in rushing yards (1,603) and ranked fourth in the nation in rushing yards per game (145.7). After being injured during the Cardinal's 42–16 loss to Washington State on October 8, McCaffrey sat out for the team's 17–10 victory in the 2016 edition of the Notre Dame-Stanford rivalry the following week. McCaffrey set a Stanford single-game rushing record with 284 rushing yards against California. McCaffrey was named to the 2016 All-Pac-12 first-team and was named the CoSIDA Academic All-American of the Year. After the season, he decided to forgo his senior year and enter the 2017 NFL draft.

On December 19, McCaffrey announced he would not participate in the team's Sun Bowl game against North Carolina, opting to skip the game to prepare for the NFL draft. His decision was met with mixed reactions; supporters agreed it was a smart decision, while those opposing considered the move selfish, and potentially detrimental to college football should other players follow suit. Radio host Mike Greenberg, in defense of McCaffrey, said, "Calling Christian McCaffrey a quitter for skipping an exhibition game to prepare for his career is the height of just not getting it." By 2018, NFL draft prospects sitting out bowls had become much more common and caused little controversy among fans.

== Professional career ==
=== Pre-draft ===
External videos
- McCaffrey's NFL Combine workout
- Christian McCaffrey's 40-yard dash
- McCaffrey's NFL Combine interview
- McCaffrey's Stanford Pro Day Highlights

McCaffrey received an invitation to the NFL Combine as one of the top running back prospects entering the draft and completed all of the required combine drills and participated in positional drills. He attended Stanford's Pro Day, but was satisfied with his combine numbers and only ran positional drills for the NFL scouts and representatives. McCaffrey was projected to be a first round pick by the majority of NFL experts and analysts. He was ranked the third best running back in the draft by Sports Illustrated, the fourth best running back by Pro Football Focus, and ranked the second best by NFLDraftScout.com and ESPN.

Pre-draft measurables
Height	Weight	Arm length	Hand span	Wingspan	40-yard dash	10-yard split	20-yard split	20-yard shuttle	Three-cone drill	Vertical jump	Broad jump	Bench press	Wonderlic
5 ft 11 1/4 in (1.81 m)	202 lb (92 kg)	30 in (0.76 m)	9 in (0.23 m)	5 ft 11 5/8 in (1.82 m)	4.48 s	1.52 s	2.60 s	4.22 s	6.57 s	37.5 in (0.95 m)	10 ft 1 in (3.07 m)	10 reps	21
All values from NFL Combine.

=== Carolina Panthers ===
==== 2017 season ====
The Carolina Panthers selected McCaffrey in the first round with the eighth overall pick in the 2017 NFL draft. He was the second running back taken, after fourth overall pick Leonard Fournette.

External videos
- Panthers select McCaffrey eighth overall
- McCaffrey receives call from Panthers

On May 4, 2017, the Carolina Panthers signed McCaffrey to a four-year, $17.2 million contract with a signing bonus of $10.7 million.

McCaffrey made his NFL season debut in the Panthers' season-opener against the San Francisco 49ers and recorded 47 rushing yards, 38 receiving yards, and a lost fumble in a 23–3 victory. In Week 3, against the New Orleans Saints, he had nine receptions for 101 yards. In Week 5 against the Detroit Lions, McCaffrey scored his first career touchdown on a six-yard shovel pass from quarterback Cam Newton. In Week 9, against the Atlanta Falcons, he scored his first career rushing touchdown on a four-yard rush in the second quarter. In the team's Monday Night Football win over the Miami Dolphins, McCaffrey scored twice–one rushing and one receiving–and totaled 50 yards. In Week 15, in a victory over the Green Bay Packers, McCaffrey brought his season total to 73 catches and five receiving touchdowns, being the only rookie running back in NFL history with at least 70 receptions and five touchdown catches before being joined by Alvin Kamara later in the season. The following week, against the Tampa Bay Buccaneers, McCaffrey brought his catch total to 75, breaking the Panthers rookie record of 74 set by Kelvin Benjamin. He finished his rookie season with 435 rushing yards, two rushing touchdowns, 80 receptions, 651 receiving yards, and five receiving touchdowns. The Panthers made the playoffs as the #5-seed. In the Wild Card Round against the New Orleans Saints, he had 16 rushing yards, six receptions, 101 receiving yards, and one receiving touchdown in the 31–26 loss.

==== 2018 season ====
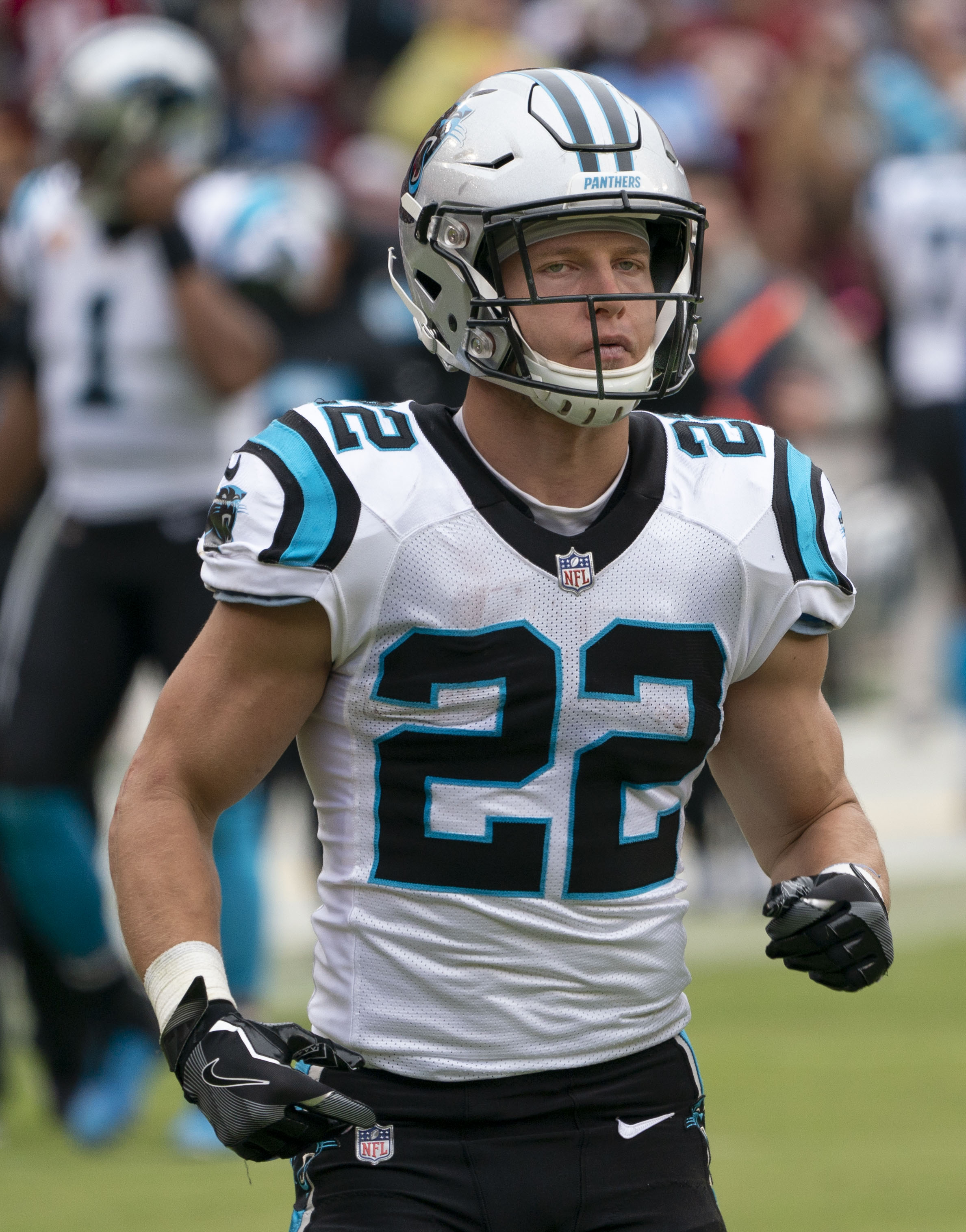
McCaffrey in 2018

In Week 2, against the Falcons, McCaffrey had 14 receptions for 102 receiving yards to go along with 37 rushing yards in the 31–24 loss. In Week 3, against the Cincinnati Bengals, he had 28 carries for a career-high 184 rushing yards in the 31–21 victory. Though limited in yardage for much of the middle of the season, from Weeks 8–10 McCaffrey compiled seven touchdowns in three games (joining DeAngelo Williams in 2008 as the only other Panther with this distinction), including all of Carolina's scores in a 52–21 loss to the Pittsburgh Steelers. On November 25, 2018, McCaffrey became the first Panther ever to have over 100 yards rushing and receiving in the same game. He had 125 yards rushing and 112 yards receiving in a loss to the Seattle Seahawks. The 237 yards set a Panthers franchise record for most yards from scrimmage in a game. He also was the first player since Arian Foster in 2011 to have 100+ yards and a touchdown both rushing and receiving, and the only player with 10+ receptions in such a game. During Week 15, in a Monday Night Football showdown against the 11–2 Saints, McCaffrey threw a 50-yard touchdown pass on 4th and 2 to Chris Manhertz. With 50 rushing, 50 receiving and 50 passing yards, he joined Walter Payton and Gale Sayers as the only others to achieve this. During Week 16 against the Atlanta Falcons, McCaffrey broke Matt Forte's record for most receptions by a running back in a single season, finishing with 101 rushing yards and 77 receiving yards as the Panthers lost 10–24. Since the Panthers were eliminated from the playoffs, he had a limited role in the Week 17 victory over the New Orleans Saints with 40 total yards. Overall, he finished the 2018 season with 1,098 rushing yards, seven rushing touchdowns, 107 receptions, 867 receiving yards, and six receiving touchdowns. McCaffrey had the opposite of a sophomore slump, as he became the Panthers franchise record holder of all-purpose yards in a season with 1,965. McCaffrey also broke the NFL record for the highest catch percentage in a single season by a player with at least 100 receptions, catching 86.3% of his targets; the former record holder was Larry Centers, who caught 84.9% of his passes while playing for the 1995 Arizona Cardinals. Michael Thomas also broke Centers' record in 2018, catching 85.0% of his targets while playing for the New Orleans Saints. McCaffrey was ranked 42nd by his fellow players on the NFL Top 100 Players of 2019.

==== 2019 season ====
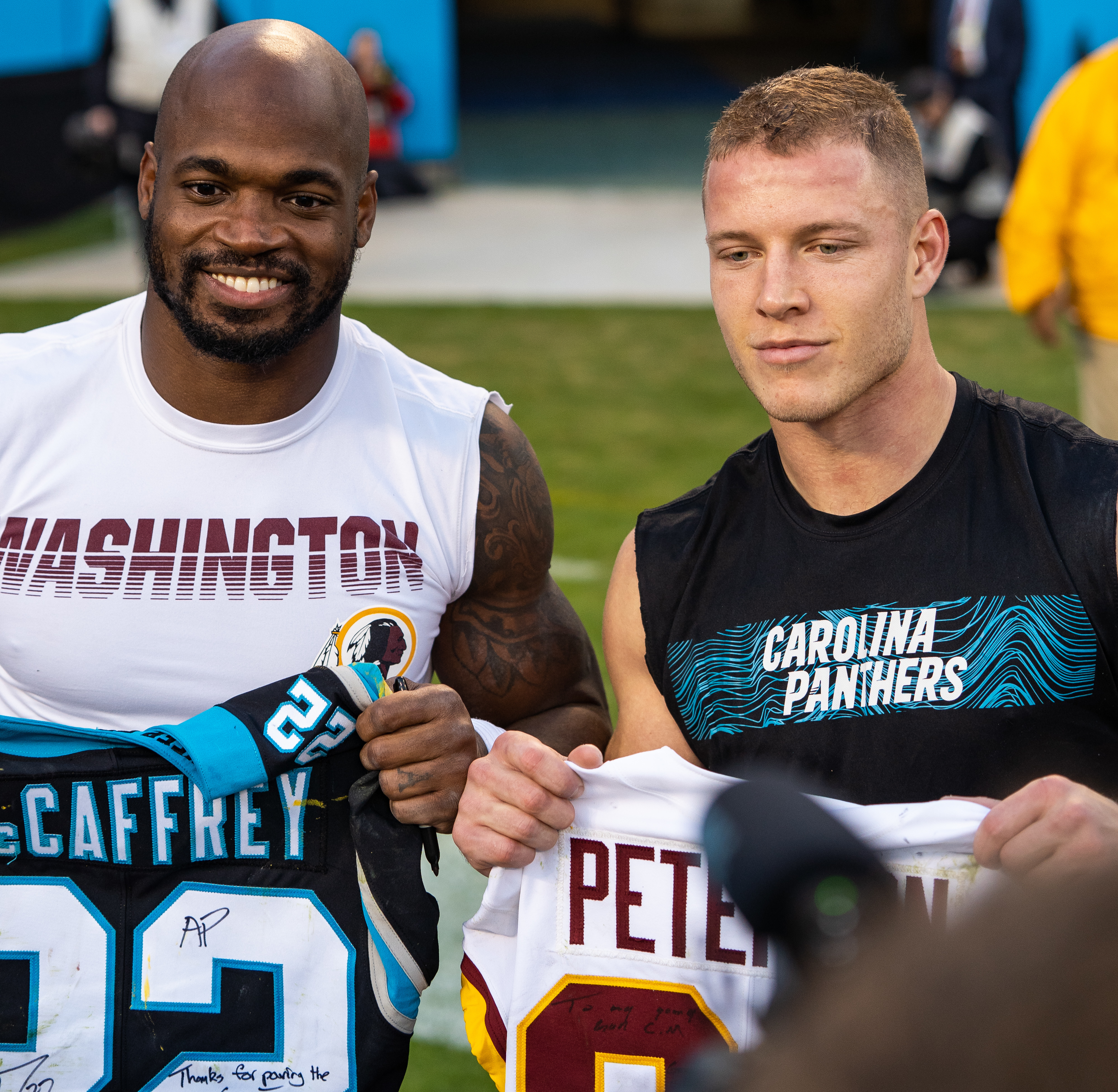
Adrian Peterson and McCaffrey exchanging jerseys after a game against the Washington Redskins, 2019

In Week 1 against the Los Angeles Rams, McCaffrey rushed 19 times for 128 yards and two touchdowns and caught 10 passes for 81 yards as the Panthers lost 27–30. He played every offensive snap and became the first player to post 10 or more receptions and 120 or more rushing yards in two career games. After losing All-Pro quarterback Cam Newton in Week 2, the Panthers beat the Arizona Cardinals 38–20 in Week 3, where McCaffrey rushed 24 times for 153 yards with a career long 76-yard touchdown and caught three passes for 35 yards. In Week 4 against the Houston Texans, McCaffrey rushed 27 times for 93 yards and one touchdown and caught 10 passes for 86 yards in the 16–10 win. In the game, McCaffrey generated 179 yards of offense while the rest of his team only generated 118 yards of offense. During Week 5 against the Jacksonville Jaguars, McCaffrey bested his career long rushing touchdown set in Week 3 with an 84-yard touchdown run. This also set a Panthers record for longest touchdown run. He finished with 176 rushing yards and 2 rushing touchdowns along with 61 receiving yards and 1 receiving touchdown, bringing it to 237 total yards as the Panthers won 34–27. In Week 6 against the Buccaneers, McCaffrey rushed 22 times for 31 yards and one touchdown and caught four passes for 26 yards and one touchdown in the 37–26 win.

During Week 9 against the Tennessee Titans, McCaffrey finished with 146 rushing yards, 20 receiving yards, and 3 total touchdowns as the Panthers won 30–20. That performance helped him maintain the league lead in rushing yards and rushing touchdowns over the Minnesota Vikings' Dalvin Cook he held from Week 6 to the midpoint of the season (through 8 games). McCaffrey continued his touchdown streak in Week 10 against the Packers on the road, carrying the ball 20 times for 108 yards on the ground and one score, while hauling in six catches for 33 yards. He also fumbled for the first time this season, and was stopped just short of the goal line in a failed comeback late in the fourth quarter in the 16–24 loss. During a Week 11 29–3 loss to the Falcons, McCaffrey finished with 121 receiving yards and 70 rushing yards; his 191 yards from scrimmage was again more than the rest of team's combined 156. He recorded his 53rd reception, breaking LaDainian Tomlinson's record for the most catches by a running back in an NFL player's first three seasons. In Week 12, against the Saints, he totaled 133 scrimmage yards (64 rushing, 69 receiving), a rushing touchdown, and a receiving touchdown. In Week 15 against the Seahawks, McCaffrey rushed 19 times for 87 yards and two touchdowns and caught eight passes for 88 yards during the 30–24 loss. In Week 16 against the Indianapolis Colts, McCaffrey rushed 13 times for 54 yards and caught 15 passes for 119 yards during the 38–6 loss. In Week 17 against the New Orleans Saints, McCaffrey rushed nine times for 26 yards and a touchdown and caught seven passes for 72 yards in the 42–10 loss. During the game, McCaffrey joined Roger Craig and Marshall Faulk as the only players to have 1,000 yards rushing and receiving in the same season.

McCaffrey finished the 2019 season with 1,387 rushing yards and 15 rushing touchdowns to go along with 116 receptions for 1,005 receiving yards and four receiving touchdowns. This performance led to McCaffrey being selected for his first Pro Bowl, played on January 26, 2020. He earned First-team All-Pro honors. McCaffrey finished third in Offensive Player of the Year voting. He accounted for 43% of his team's offensive yards during the season, the largest percentage of any individual player in the NFL. He was ranked sixth by his fellow players on the NFL Top 100 Players of 2020.

==== 2020 season ====
On April 16, 2020, McCaffrey signed a four-year, $64 million contract extension with the Panthers through the 2025 season, making him the highest-paid running back in NFL history.

In Week 1, McCaffrey carried the ball 23 times for 96 yards and two rushing touchdowns and caught three of four targets for 38 receiving yards in a 34–30 home loss to the Las Vegas Raiders. In Week 2 against the Buccaneers, he totaled 88 scrimmage yards and two rushing touchdowns in the 31–17 loss. When McCaffrey rushed for his second touchdown early in the fourth quarter, he suffered a high ankle sprain and missed the rest of the game. He was placed on injured reserve on September 23. He was activated on November 7 prior to Week 9. In Week 9 against the Kansas City Chiefs, McCaffrey recorded 69 rushing yards and a rushing touchdown and 82 receiving yards and a receiving touchdown during the 33–31 loss. During the game, McCaffrey suffered a shoulder injury and was later ruled out of the Panthers' following game and later the remainder of the season. He was ranked 44th by his fellow players on the NFL Top 100 Players of 2021.

==== 2021 season ====
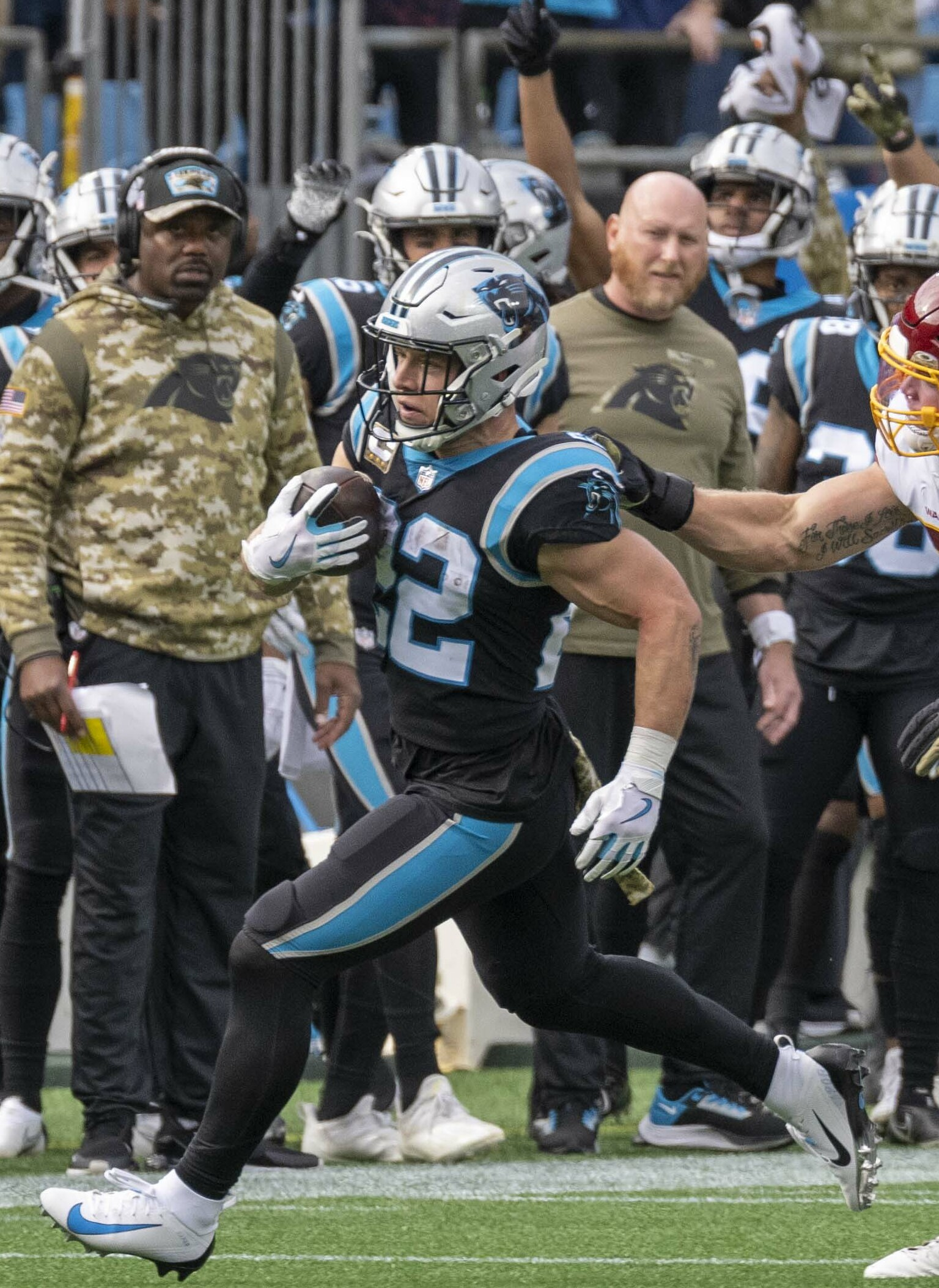
McCaffrey in 2021

McCaffrey started the 2021 season with 177 scrimmage yards in Week 1 against the New York Jets and 137 scrimmage yards in Week 2 against the Saints. In Week 3, McCaffrey suffered a hamstring injury that kept him out the next two games. Despite returning to practice prior to Week 6, he was placed on injured reserve on October 16. He was activated on November 6 for Week 9. He went over 100 scrimmage yards in the following three games. On November 29, the Panthers announced that McCaffrey would miss the remainder of the season with an ankle injury he suffered during the Panthers Week 12 loss to the Dolphins. He finished the 2021 season with 442 rushing yards, 343 receiving yards, and two total touchdowns in seven games.

==== 2022 season ====
In the season opener against the Cleveland Browns, McCaffrey had 14 carries for 57 yards and one touchdown in a 24–26 defeat. Through the first six games with the Panthers, McCaffrey had 393 rushing yards, 277 receiving yards, three total touchdowns, and 670 scrimmage yards.

=== San Francisco 49ers ===
==== 2022 season ====
McCaffrey was traded to the 49ers on October 20, 2022, in exchange for a second, third, and fourth-round pick in the 2023 NFL draft, and a fifth-round pick in the 2024 draft.

McCaffrey made his 49ers debut in Week 7 against the Chiefs, where he had 38 rushing yards and 24 receiving yards in the 44–23 loss. In Week 8 against the Rams, McCaffrey became the first 49ers running back to record passing, rushing, and receiving touchdowns in the same game. McCaffrey was the fourth player since the 1970 AFL–NFL merger to complete the trifecta. He was named National Football Conference (NFC) Offensive Player of the Week for Week 8. In Week 13, against the Dolphins, he had 146 scrimmage yards and a receiving touchdown in the 33–17 victory. In the following game against the Buccaneers, he had 153 scrimmage yards, one rushing touchdown, and one receiving touchdown in the 35–7 victory. In the next game, against the Seahawks, he had 138 scrimmage yards and a rushing touchdown in the 21–13 victory. In Week 17, against the Raiders, he had 193 scrimmage yards and a rushing touchdown in the 37–34 victory. He finished the 2022 season with 244 carries for 1,139 rushing yards and eight rushing touchdowns to go along with 85 receptions for 741 receiving yards and five receiving touchdowns. He was named to the Pro Bowl.

McCaffrey was productive in the postseason for the 49ers. In the Wild Card Round against the Seattle Seahawks, he had 15 carries for 119 rushing yards to go with a receiving touchdown in the 41–23 victory. He had a rushing touchdown in the 19–12 victory over the Dallas Cowboys in the Divisional Round. In the NFC Championship, he had 106 scrimmage yards and a rushing touchdown in the 31–7 loss to the Philadelphia Eagles. He was ranked 35th by his fellow players on the NFL Top 100 Players of 2023.

==== 2023 season ====
During Week 1 against the Pittsburgh Steelers, McCaffrey had 22 carries for 152 yards and a touchdown, as well as three receptions for 17 yards. His most notable play was a 65-yard rushing touchdown, which was assisted by the 49ers' run blocking and open field blocks by Ray-Ray McCloud and Brandon Aiyuk. For his performance in the game, he was made the FedEx Ground Player of the Week. In Week 3 against the New York Giants, McCaffrey had 18 carries for 85 yards and a touchdown, and five receptions for 34 yards. Against the Arizona Cardinals in Week 4, McCaffrey had 20 carries for 106 yards and three touchdowns, and seven receptions for 71 yards and a touchdown. With his first touchdown in the game, and his 13th straight game with a touchdown, McCaffrey broke Jerry Rice's franchise record for most consecutive games with a touchdown. He was named both FedEx Ground Player of the Week (for a fourth straight time), and NFC Offensive Player of the Week.

In Week 8, against the Cincinnati Bengals, McCaffrey had 12 rushes for 54 yards and one touchdown, as well as six receptions for 64 yards and a touchdown in the 31–17 loss. With a 2-yard rushing score, McCaffrey tied Lenny Moore's NFL record for the most games in a row with a touchdown score recorded, having had 17 straight games with a touchdown. However, the streak would be broken during their Week 10 matchup against the Jacksonville Jaguars, in which he recorded 16 carries for 95 yards, and six receptions for 47 yards. During Week 12 against the Seattle Seahawks, McCaffrey recorded 19 carries for 114 yards and two touchdowns, as well as five receptions for 25 yards. For the performance, he was again named FedEx Ground Player of the Week. Against the Seahawks in Week 14, McCaffrey recorded 16 carries for 145 yards and was named FedEx Ground Player of the Week for the fifth time this season. Against the Cardinals in Week 15, he recorded 18 carries for 115 yards and a touchdown, as well as five receptions for 72 yards and two touchdowns.

Against the Washington Commanders, McCaffrey recorded 14 carries for 64 yards, as well as four receptions for 27 yards. During the second half of the game, he would be taken out with a mild calf strain. Despite it being minor, he would still be designated as one of the starters to sit out for the season finale against the Rams. McCaffrey finished his first full season with the 49ers leading the league in rushing yards (1,459), touches (339), yards from scrimmage (2,023), and touchdowns (21). His 1,459 rushing yards were a career-best, along with his yards per rushing attempt (5.4) and receiving touchdowns (7). McCaffrey won his first Offensive Player of the Year award and finished third in NFL MVP voting, behind quarterbacks Dak Prescott and Lamar Jackson.

In the 49ers' playoff game against the Green Bay Packers in the Divisional Round, McCaffrey had 17 carries for 98 yards and two touchdowns, as well as seven receptions for 30 yards. McCaffrey scored the game-winning touchdown on a 6-yard run in the 24–21 victory. In the 2023 NFC Championship Game against the Detroit Lions, McCaffrey finished with 20 carries for 90 yards and two touchdowns, as well as 4 receptions for 42 yards as the 49ers would come back from a 24–7 deficit at halftime to win 34–31 en route to Super Bowl LVIII. Against the Kansas City Chiefs in the Super Bowl, McCaffrey rushed 22 times for 80 yards while catching all eight of his targets for 80 yards and a touchdown. He became the first player in Super Bowl history to have at least 75 rushing yards and 75 receiving yards in the same game. He also lost a fumble in the first quarter as the 49ers lost 25–22 in overtime. He was ranked third by his fellow players on the NFL Top 100 Players of 2024.

==== 2024 season ====
On June 4, 2024, McCaffrey signed a two-year extension worth $38 million through the 2027 season. McCaffrey remained the highest-paid running back and reset the record with this new $38 million deal. During training camp, McCaffrey dealt with a calf and Achilles injury which caused him to miss the preseason games and kept him out of the 49ers' season-opening game against the Jets, despite initial optimism that he would play. After head coach Kyle Shanahan stated that McCaffrey had his worst day in terms of pain during practice leading up to Week 2, the 49ers placed him on injured reserve. While on IR, McCaffrey visited an Achilles specialist in Germany for his Achilles tendonitis. Following their bye week, the 49ers opened McCaffrey's 21-day practice window on November 4. He was activated on November 9 and made his season debut in Week 10 against the Tampa Bay Buccaneers.

On December 1, in his fourth game of the season against the Buffalo Bills, McCaffrey left the game in the first half with a posterior cruciate ligament injury to his right knee and did not return. Following the game, Shanahan stated the injury has an expected six-week recovery period and that he would be placed on IR, ending his regular season. McCaffrey finished the 2024 season with 348 scrimmage yards and zero touchdowns in four games, compared to over 2,000 yards and 21 touchdowns the previous season. Despite missing most of the season, he was ranked 73rd by his fellow players on the NFL Top 100 Players of 2025.

==== 2025 season ====
In Week 7, McCaffrey recorded 129 rushing yards and two touchdowns, along with seven catches for 72 yards, in a 20–10 win over the Atlanta Falcons, earning NFC Offensive Player of the Week. McCaffrey finished the 2025 season with 311 carries for 1,202 rushing yards and ten rushing touchdowns to go with 102 receptions for 924 receiving yards and seven receiving touchdowns. McCaffrey's 2,126 scrimmage yards were the most by a 49ers player since Frank Gore in 2006, and was second in the league behind the Atlanta Falcons' Bijan Robinson. He won the Comeback Player of the Year award at the NFL Honors, becoming the first non-quarterback to do so since Keenan Allen in 2017.

==== 2026 season ====
During Week 10 against the Dallas Cowboys, Christian McCaffrey finished with 62 rushing yards, 162 receiving yards, and 3 total touchdowns. One play highlighted a 74-yard receiving touchdown, and the 49ers won 46–40.

== Career statistics ==
Legend
	AP NFL Offensive Player of the Year
	Led the league
**Bold**	Career high

=== NFL ===
==== Regular season ====
Year	Team	Games		Rushing					Receiving					Scrimmage				Passing							Fumbles	
Year	Team	GP	GS	Att	Yds	Y/A	Lng	TD	Rec	Yds	Y/R	Lng	TD	Touch	Y/Tch	YScm	RRTD	Cmp	Att	Pct	Yds	TD	Int	Rtg	Fum	Lost
2017	CAR	16	10	117	435	3.7	40	2	80	651	8.1	37	5	197	5.5	1,086	7	—	—	—	—	—	—	—	2	1
2018	CAR	16	16	219	1,098	5.0	59	7	107	867	8.1	38	6	326	**6.0**	1,965	13	**1**	1	**100.0**	**50**	**1**	0	**158.3**	**4**	1
2019	CAR	16	16	287	1,387	4.8	**84**	**15**	**116**	**1,005**	8.7	28	4	403	5.9	**2,392**	19	0	**2**	0	0	0	0	39.6	1	0
2020	CAR	3	3	59	225	3.8	15	5	17	149	8.8	24	1	76	4.9	374	6	—	—	—	—	—	—	—	0	0
2021	CAR	7	7	99	442	4.5	18	1	37	343	9.3	32	1	136	5.8	785	2	—	—	—	—	—	—	—	1	0
2022	CAR	6	6	85	393	4.6	49	2	33	277	8.4	**49**	1	118	5.7	670	3	—	—	—	—	—	—	—	0	0
2022	SF	11	10	159	746	4.7	38	6	52	464	8.9	38	4	211	5.7	1,210	10	**1**	1	**100.0**	34	**1**	0	**158.3**	1	0
2023	SF	16	16	272	**1,459**	**5.4**	72	14	67	564	8.4	41	**7**	339	**6.0**	2,023	**21**	—	—	—	—	—	—	—	3	**2**
2024	SF	4	4	50	202	4.0	19	0	15	146	**9.7**	30	0	65	5.4	348	0	—	—	—	—	—	—	—	1	1
2025	SF	17	17	**311**	1,202	3.9	41	10	102	924	9.1	39	**7**	**413**	5.1	2,126	17	0	1	0	0	0	0	39.6	2	0
2026	SF	9	9	115	519	4.5	17	10	40	431	10.8	74	3	155	6.1	950	13	—	—	—	—	—	—	—	1	1
Career		121	114	1,773	8,108	4.6	84	72	666	5,821	8.7	74	39	2,439	5.7	13,929	111	2	5	40.0	50	2	0	127.1	15	5

==== Postseason ====
Year	Team	Games		Rushing					Receiving					Scrimmage				Fumbles	
Year	Team	GP	GS	Att	Yds	Y/A	Lng	TD	Rec	Yds	Y/R	Lng	TD	Touch	Y/Tch	YScm	RRTD	Fum	Lost
2017	CAR	1	1	6	16	2.7	7	0	6	101	**16.8**	**56**	1	12	**9.8**	117	1	0	0
2022	SF	3	3	40	238	**6.0**	**68**	2	12	61	5.1	14	1	52	5.8	299	3	0	0
2023	SF	3	3	**59**	**268**	4.5	39	**4**	**19**	**152**	8.0	28	1	**78**	5.4	**420**	**5**	**1**	**1**
2025	SF	2	2	26	83	3.2	10	0	11	105	9.5	29	**2**	37	5.1	188	2	0	0
Career		9	9	131	605	4.6	68	6	48	419	8.7	56	5	179	5.7	1,024	11	1	1

=== College ===
Legend
NCAA record

Year	Team	GP	Rushing				Receiving				Punt return				Kickoff return				All-purpose	
Year	Team	GP	Att	Yds	Avg	TD	Rec	Yds	Avg	TD	Ret	Yds	Avg	TD	Ret	Yds	Avg	TD	Yds	TD
2014	Stanford	13	42	300	**7.1**	0	17	251	**14.8**	2	9	**154**	**17.1**	0	5	91	18.2	0	796	2
2015	Stanford	14	**337**	**2,019**	6.0	8	**45**	**645**	14.3	**5**	**15**	130	8.7	**1**	**37**	**1,070**	**28.9**	**1**	**3,864**	15
2016	Stanford	11	253	1,603	6.3	**13**	37	310	8.4	3	10	96	9.6	0	14	318	22.7	0	2,327	**16**
Total		38	632	3,922	6.2	21	99	1,206	12.2	10	34	380	11.2	1	56	1,479	14.7	1	6,987	33

== Career highlights ==
=== Awards and honors ===
NFL

- NFL Offensive Player of the Year (2023)
- NFL Comeback Player of the Year (2025)
- 3× First-team All-Pro (2019 (Note: Selected as a running back and the flex), 2023, 2025 (Note: Selected as the all purpose))
- Second-team All-Pro (2018 (Note: Selected as the flex))
- 4× Pro Bowl (2019, 2022, 2023, 2025)
- NFL rushing yards leader (2023)
- 2× FedEx Ground Player of the Year (2023, 2025)
- Bart Starr Award (2026)
- Salute to Service award (2025)
- 7× NFL Top 100 — 42nd (2019), 6th (2020), 44th (2021), 35th (2023), 3rd (2024), 73rd (2025), 6th (2026)
- Best Comeback Athlete ESPY Award (2026)
- 4× NFC Offensive Player of the Month (September 2019, December 2022, September 2023, December 2023)
- 3× NFC Offensive Player of the Week (Week 8, 2022; Week 4, 2023; Week 7, 2025)
- Fantasy Performance of the Week: Week 6, 2026;
- Yards after catch leader: (2019)

College

- Paul Hornung Award (2015)
- Jet Award (2015)
- AP College Football Player of the Year (2015)
- Chic Harley Award (2015)
- Consensus All-American (2015)
- Pac-12 Offensive Player of the Year (2015)
- 2× First-team All-Pac-12 (2015, 2016)

=== Records ===
==== NCAA records ====
NCAA (FBS) records

- Most career all-purpose yards: 6,987
- Most all-purpose yards in a season: 3,864 (2015)

==== NFL records ====
- Most receptions by a running back in a single season (116)
- Only running back to have three seasons with 100 or more receptions
- Most games with at least 1+ rushing and 1+ receiving touchdown in NFL history: 17
- Most seasons with 800+ receiving yards by a running back: 3 (2018, 2019, 2025) tied with Marshall Faulk
- Only the third player in NFL history to record over 1,000 yards rushing and 1,000 yards receiving in a single season, joining Marshall Faulk and Roger Craig.
- Most seasons with 5+ receiving touchdowns by a running back: 5 (2017, 2018, 2022, 2023, 2025)
- Only the fourth player in NFL history to have 7,000 rushing and 5,000 receiving yards in a career
- Only the third player in NFL history to have 50 rushing and 30 receiving touchdowns in a career

==== Panthers records ====
- Single-season records for most receptions by any player (116)
- Single-season records for most scrimmage yards by any player (2,392)
- First player in Panthers history to reach 2,000 yards from scrimmage in a season
- Most scrimmage yards by any player in first two seasons (3,051)
- Most scrimmage yards by any player in first three seasons (5,443)
- Single-season records for most receiving yards by a running back (1,005)
- Single-season records for most receiving touchdowns by a running back (6)
- Single-season records for most receiving first downs by a running back (41)
- Longest rush by a running back in franchise history (84 yards)
- Franchise record for receiving yards by a running back in a single game with 121 receiving yards on 11 catches

==== 49ers records ====
- Most consecutive games with a touchdown (17)
- Most rushing touchdowns in a season (14) (2023)

== Personal life ==
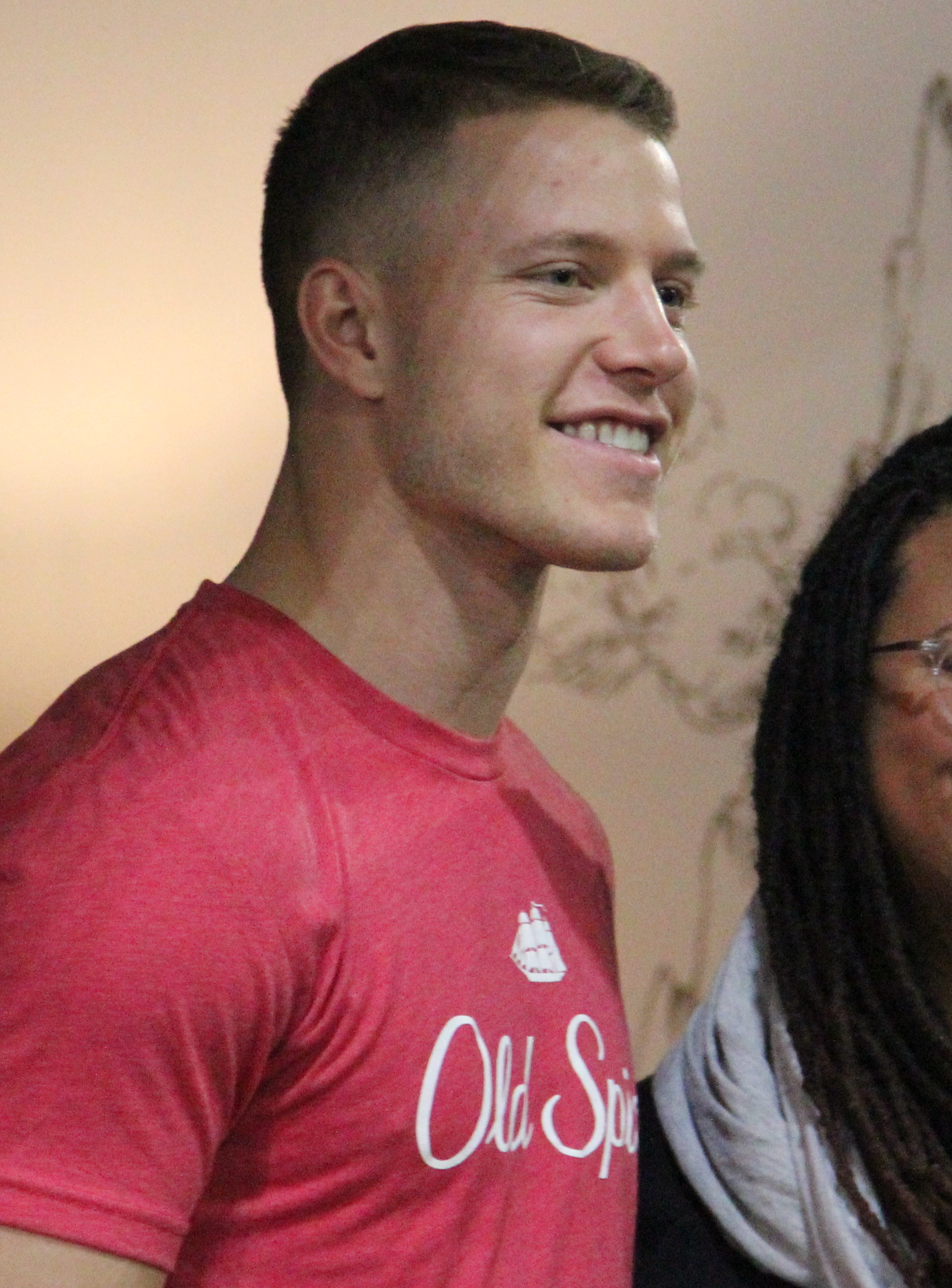
McCaffrey in 2019

McCaffrey's father, Ed McCaffrey, played college football at Stanford and in the NFL, primarily for the Denver Broncos, from 1991 to 2003. His mother, Lisa Sime, played soccer at Stanford. His older brother Max played football at Duke University, and then on several NFL teams as a wide receiver. His younger brother, Dylan, was a quarterback at Northern Colorado. His youngest brother, Luke, is a wide receiver for the Washington Commanders. His uncle, Billy McCaffrey, played college basketball at Duke and Vanderbilt University. His maternal grandfather Dave Sime (1936–2016) was a pioneering ophthalmologist and an Olympic sprinter, the silver medalist (photo finish) in the 100 meters in 1960.

McCaffrey is Catholic. He has said, "My faith is very important to me and that's why I'm praying all the time. When you have a bunch of people chanting your name, it's important that you give the honor and glory back to the person, God, that's allowing me to do this." McCaffrey is a lifelong fan of Bruce Lee, having been introduced to Lee's films by his father and crediting Lee's philosophy with helping him mentally throughout his career.

McCaffrey has been in a relationship with Miss Universe 2012 Olivia Culpo since 2019. They announced their engagement on April 7, 2023. The two were married on June 29, 2024, in Watch Hill, Rhode Island. On March 10, 2025, McCaffrey and Culpo announced that they were expecting their first child. On July 13, 2025, they welcomed a daughter.

In 2018, McCaffrey appeared in a commercial for the NFL, along with Jay Ajayi, Todd Gurley, and DeAndre Hopkins.

In June 2024, McCaffrey was revealed as the cover athlete for Madden NFL 25, becoming the second 49er to grace the cover after Garrison Hearst in the PAL version of Madden NFL 99.
