= Max McCaffrey =

American football player and coach (born 1994)

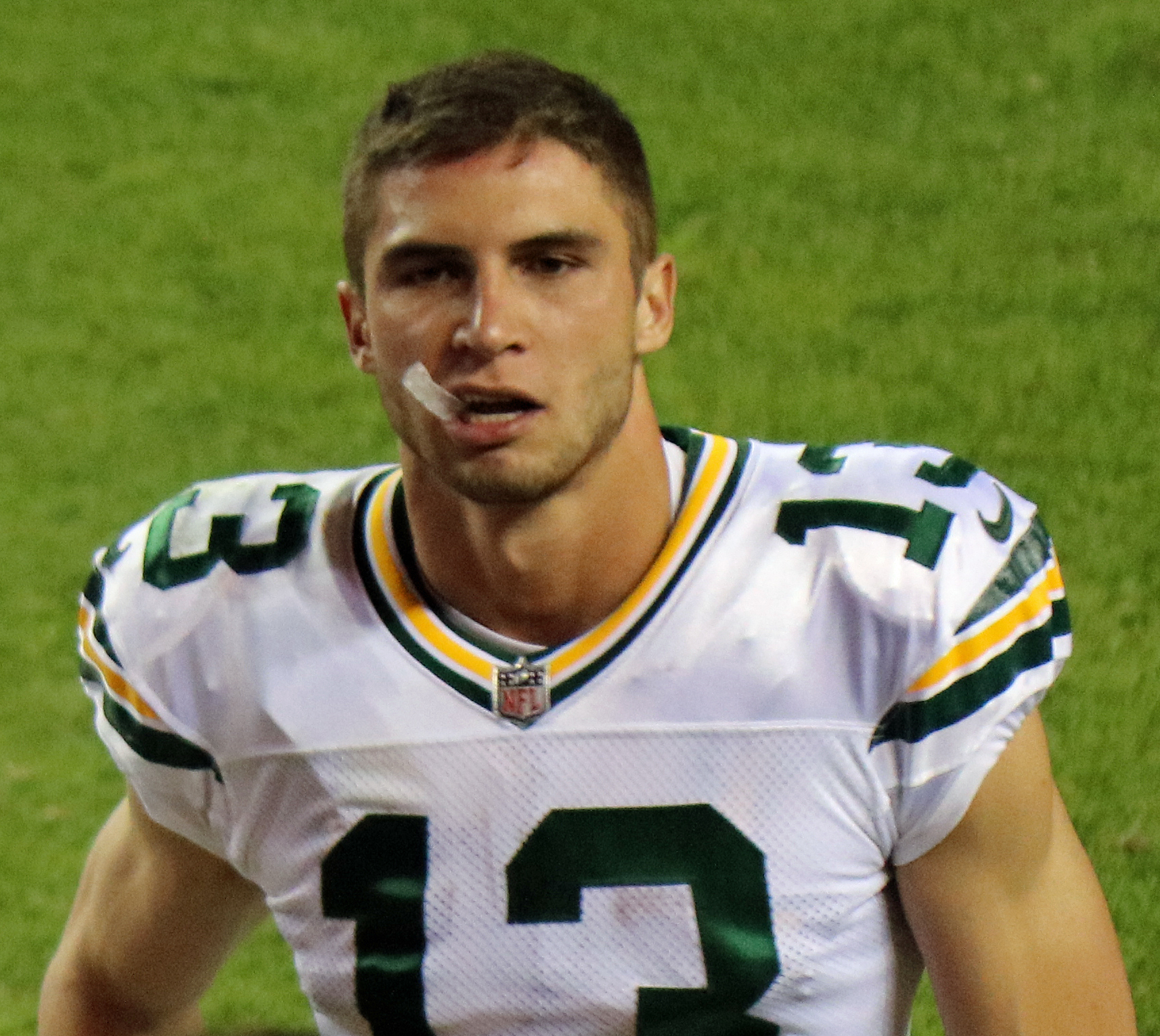
- McCaffrey with the Green Bay Packers in 2017

Los Angeles Chargers
- Title: Running backs coach

Personal information
- Born: May 17, 1994 (age 32); Castle Rock, Colorado, U.S.
- Listed height: 6 ft 2 in (1.88 m)
- Listed weight: 200 lb (91 kg)

Career information
- Position: Wide receiver (No. 19, 14)
- High school: Valor Christian (Highlands Ranch, Colorado)
- College: Duke (2012–2015)
- NFL draft: 2016: undrafted

Career history

Playing
- Oakland Raiders (2016)*; Green Bay Packers (2016); New Orleans Saints (2017)*; Jacksonville Jaguars (2017); Green Bay Packers (2017)*; San Francisco 49ers (2017–2018); DC Defenders (2020)*
- * Offseason or practice squad member only

Coaching
- Northern Colorado (2020) Wide receivers coach; Northern Colorado (2021–2022) Offensive coordinator & wide receivers coach; Miami Dolphins (2023–2025) Offensive assistant; Los Angeles Chargers (2026–present) Running backs coach

Career NFL statistics
- Receptions: 1
- Receiving yards: 4
- Receiving touchdowns: 0
- Stats at Pro Football Reference

Maxwell James McCaffrey (born May 17, 1994) is an American coach and former professional wide receiver who is the running backs coach for the Los Angeles Chargers of the National Football League (NFL). He played college football for the Duke Blue Devils and signed with the Oakland Raiders as an undrafted free agent in 2016. A member of the McCaffrey football family, he is the son of Ed and the eldest brother of Christian, Dylan, and Luke.

== College career ==
In 53 games at Duke (38 starts), McCaffrey caught 117 passes for 1,341 yards and 12 touchdowns, and twice received Academic All-ACC honors. In 2015, he started all 13 games, making 52 receptions for 643 yards (12.4 per catch) and five touchdowns.

== Professional career ==
Pre-draft measurables
Height	Weight	Arm length	Hand span	Wingspan	40-yard dash	10-yard split	20-yard split	20-yard shuttle	Three-cone drill	Vertical jump	Broad jump	Bench press
6 ft 2 in (1.88 m)	196 lb (89 kg)	32 1/2 in (0.83 m)	9 in (0.23 m)	6 ft 5 1/2 in (1.97 m)	4.46 s	1.54 s	2.60 s	4.15 s	7.09 s	36.5 in (0.93 m)	10 ft 2 in (3.10 m)	9 reps
All values from Pro Day

=== Oakland Raiders ===
On April 30, 2016, McCaffrey signed with the Oakland Raiders as an undrafted free agent following the conclusion of the 2016 NFL draft. On August 29, he was released by the Raiders.

=== Green Bay Packers (first stint) ===
On December 20, 2016, McCaffrey was signed to the Packers' practice squad. On January 21, 2017, McCaffrey was promoted to the active roster prior to the NFC Championship matchup against the Atlanta Falcons, as insurance for Jordy Nelson. However, he did not play in the game. He remained with the Packers through the offseason and the 2017 preseason, before being waived on September 2.

=== New Orleans Saints ===
On September 3, 2017, McCaffrey was signed to the New Orleans Saints' practice squad.

=== Jacksonville Jaguars ===
On September 12, 2017, McCaffrey was signed to the Jacksonville Jaguars active roster off the Saints' practice squad after Allen Robinson was placed on injured reserve. In Week 5, against the Pittsburgh Steelers, he made his first NFL catch, a four-yard reception. He was waived by the Jaguars on October 21.

=== Green Bay Packers (second stint) ===
On October 24, 2017, McCaffrey was signed to the Packers' practice squad.

=== San Francisco 49ers ===
On December 13, 2017, McCaffrey was signed by the San Francisco 49ers to a two-year deal off the Packers' practice squad.

On August 29, 2018, McCaffrey was waived/injured by the 49ers after having foot surgery and was placed on injured reserve. He was released the next day. He was suspended for the first four weeks of the season on September 7, and reinstated from suspension on October 2. He was re-signed to the 49ers' practice squad on November 27. On December 29, McCaffrey was promoted to the active roster.

On August 3, 2019, McCaffrey was waived by the 49ers.

=== DC Defenders ===
On October 15, 2019, McCaffrey was drafted in the eighth round of the 2019 XFL draft by the DC Defenders.

McCaffrey was suspended by the NFL for 10 weeks on October 25. He was reinstated from suspension on December 30.

Deciding to join his father at the University of Northern Colorado and accepting a job as the wide receivers coach for the Bears in January 2020, he was released before the start of the regular season.

== NFL career statistics ==
=== Regular season ===
Legend
**Bold**	Career high

Year	Team	Games		Receiving					Fumbles	
Year	Team	GP	GS	Rec	Yds	TD	Avg	Lng	Fum	Lost
2017	JAX	**5**	0	**1**	**4**	0	**4.0**	**4**	0	0
2018	SF	1	0	0	0	0	0.0	0	0	0
Career		6	0	1	4	0	4.0	4	0	0

== Coaching career ==
On January 14, 2020, McCaffrey joined his father on the University of Northern Colorado coaching staff as a wide receivers coach, after abruptly leaving the DC Defenders days into training camp.

McCaffrey was promoted to Offensive Coordinator in the summer of 2021. As the OC, he still worked with the wide receivers.

On March 10, 2023, it was announced that McCaffrey would be an offensive assistant for the Miami Dolphins.

On February 20, 2026, the Los Angeles Chargers hired McCaffrey as their running backs coach, rejoining with the Chargers' offensive coordinator Mike McDaniel, under whom he worked when McDaniel was the head coach of the Miami Dolphins.

== Personal life ==
McCaffrey is the eldest son of Ed and Lisa. His younger brother Christian was drafted in the first round as a running back by the Carolina Panthers before being traded to the San Francisco 49ers, and played the same position at Stanford. His younger brother Dylan played for University of Northern Colorado, as a quarterback. His youngest brother, Luke, is now a wide receiver for the Washington Commanders. His father was a wide receiver in the National Football League for thirteen seasons from 1991–2003 where he played for the New York Giants, San Francisco 49ers and Denver Broncos. His uncle Billy played two seasons of basketball at Duke and played on the 1991 national championship team before transferring to Vanderbilt and sharing SEC Player of the Year honors in 1992–93. McCaffrey's maternal grandfather, Dave Sime, was a multisport athlete at Duke.
