= Ed McCaffrey =

American football player and coach (born 1968)

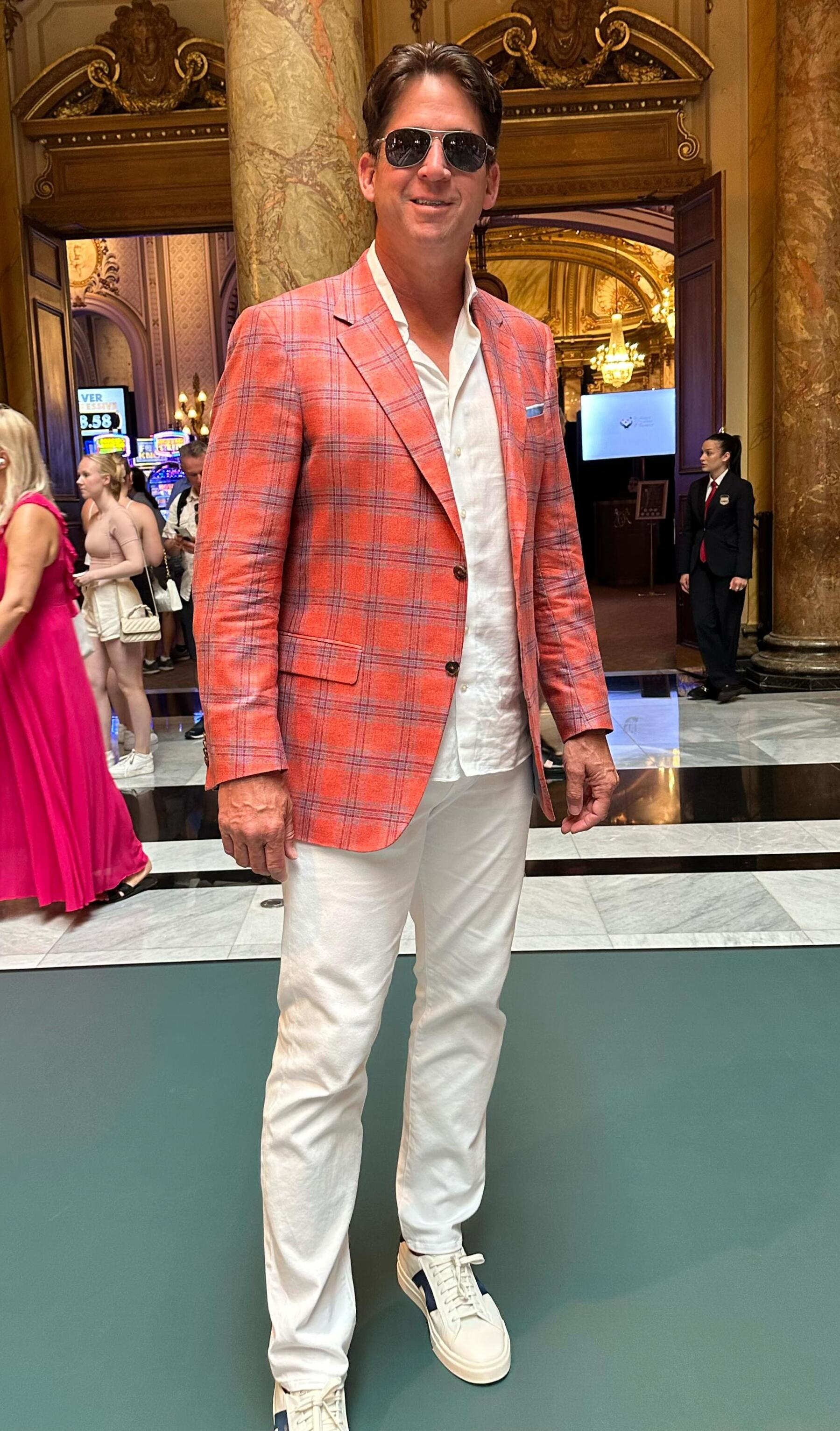
- McCaffrey in 2024

No. 81, 87
- Position: Wide receiver

Personal information
- Born: August 17, 1968 (age 58); Waynesboro, Pennsylvania, U.S.
- Listed height: 6 ft 5 in (1.96 m)
- Listed weight: 215 lb (98 kg)

Career information
- High school: Allentown Central Catholic (Allentown, Pennsylvania)
- College: Stanford (1986–1990)
- NFL draft: 1991: 3rd round, 83rd overall pick

Career history

Playing
- New York Giants (1991–1993); San Francisco 49ers (1994); Denver Broncos (1995–2003)

Coaching
- Valor Christian HS (CO) (2018–2019) Head coach; Northern Colorado (2020–2022) Head coach

Awards and highlights
- 3× Super Bowl champion (XXIX, XXXII, XXXIII); Second-team All-Pro (1998); Pro Bowl (1998); Denver Broncos 50th Anniversary Team; First-team All-America (1990); First-team All-Pac-10 (1990)

Career NFL statistics
- Receptions: 565
- Receiving yards: 7,422
- Receiving touchdowns: 55
- Stats at Pro Football Reference

Edward Thomas McCaffrey (born August 17, 1968) is an American former professional football player who was a wide receiver for 13 seasons in the National Football League (NFL) for the New York Giants, San Francisco 49ers, and Denver Broncos. He played college football for the Stanford Cardinal, where he earned first-team All-America honors in 1990.

Regarded as one of the best blocking wide receivers in NFL history, McCaffrey is a three-time Super Bowl champion (XXIX, XXXII, XXXIII), a second-team All-Pro selection in 1998, and a member of the Broncos' 50th anniversary team. He is the father of football players Max, Christian, Dylan, and Luke McCaffrey.

== Early life and education ==
McCaffrey was born on August 17, 1968, in Waynesboro, Pennsylvania and attended Allentown Central Catholic High School in Allentown, where he played football in the Eastern Pennsylvania Conference and was a standout basketball player, leading the school to Pennsylvania state titles in 1984 and 1986.

=== Collegiate football career ===
McCaffrey attended Stanford University, where he played college football for the Cardinal. He finished his Stanford career as the school's fifth all-time leader in receptions (146) and third all-time leader in receiving yards (2,333). He earned first-team All-America and All-Pac-10 Conference honors as a senior in 1990, catching 61 passes for 917 yards and eight touchdowns that season. McCaffrey was enshrined in Stanford's Athletic Hall of Fame in 1990. At Stanford, he was also a member of Sigma Alpha Epsilon fraternity.

== National Football League ==
Pre-draft measurables
| Height | Weight | Arm length | Hand span | 40-yard dash | 10-yard split | 20-yard split | 20-yard shuttle | Vertical jump |
|---|---|---|---|---|---|---|---|---|
| 6 ft 5 in (1.96 m) | 210 lb (95 kg) | 34 1/2 in (0.88 m) | 10 1/4 in (0.26 m) | 4.69 s | 1.64 s | 2.73 s | 4.15 s | 37.0 in (0.94 m) |
All values from NFL Combine

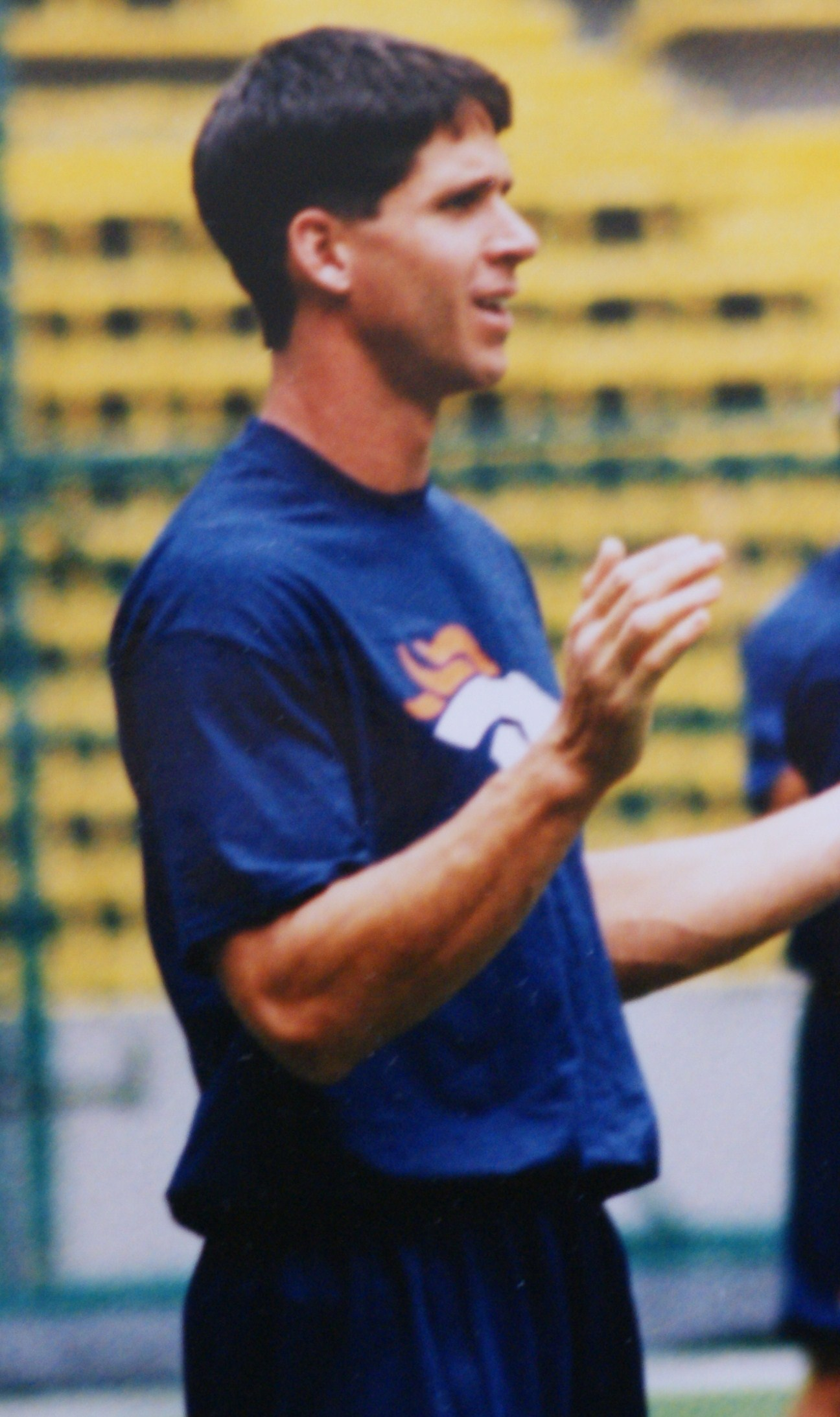
McCaffrey with the Denver Broncos in 1998

McCaffrey entered the 1991 NFL draft and was selected by the New York Giants in the third round (83rd overall). During his thirteen-year career, he won three Super Bowl rings, Super Bowl XXIX with the San Francisco 49ers and Super Bowl XXXII and Super Bowl XXXIII with the Denver Broncos and was named to the Pro Bowl in 1998.

With the Denver Broncos, he became a reliable target for quarterback John Elway, set a Broncos record for most receptions in a season at the time with 101 receptions in the 2000 season, and had an exceptional performance in Super Bowl XXXIII against the Atlanta Falcons, recording five catches for 72 yards. In 2000, McCaffrey and teammate Rod Smith became only the second wide receiver duo from the same team to each gain 100 receptions in the same season, matching a record by Herman Moore and Brett Perriman.

In the opening game of the Broncos' 2001 season, McCaffrey suffered a leg fracture in a Monday Night Football game against the New York Giants. He rebounded in the 2002 season for the Broncos, registering 69 receptions and 903 yards. Hampered by injuries during a disappointing 2003 season, McCaffrey retired on February 29, 2004. He finished his career with 565 career receptions for 7,422 yards along with 55 touchdowns. During his tenure, he was known by the nicknames "Easy," “Eddie Mac,” “White Lightning,” and “The Bruise.”

== NFL career statistics ==
Regular season
| Year | Team | GP | Receiving | | | | |
| Year | Team | GP | Rec | Yds | Avg | Lng | TD |
|---|---|---|---|---|---|---|---|
| 1991 | NYG | 16 | 16 | 146 | 9.1 | 26 | 0 |
| 1992 | NYG | 16 | 49 | 610 | 12.4 | 44 | 5 |
| 1993 | NYG | 16 | 27 | 335 | 12.4 | 31 | 2 |
| 1994 | SF | 16 | 11 | 131 | 11.9 | 32 | 2 |
| 1995 | DEN | 16 | 39 | 477 | 12.2 | 35 | 2 |
| 1996 | DEN | 15 | 48 | 553 | 11.5 | 39 | 7 |
| 1997 | DEN | 15 | 45 | 590 | 13.1 | 35 | 8 |
| 1998 | DEN | 15 | 64 | 1,053 | 16.5 | 48 | 10 |
| 1999 | DEN | 15 | 71 | 1,018 | 14.3 | 78 | 7 |
| 2000 | DEN | 16 | 101 | 1,317 | 13.0 | 61 | 9 |
| 2001 | DEN | 1 | 6 | 94 | 15.7 | 28 | 1 |
| 2002 | DEN | 16 | 69 | 903 | 13.1 | 69 | 2 |
| 2003 | DEN | 12 | 19 | 195 | 10.3 | 23 | 0 |
| Career | | 185 | 565 | 7,422 | 13.1 | 78 | 55 |

Postseason
| Year | Team | GP | Receiving | | | | | |
| Year | Team | GP | Rec | Yds | Avg | Lng | TD | FD |
|---|---|---|---|---|---|---|---|---|
| 1993 | NYG | 2 | 5 | 59 | 11.8 | 14 | 0 | 2 |
| 1994 | SF | 3 | 1 | 5 | 5.0 | 5 | 0 | 0 |
| 1996 | DEN | 1 | 5 | 54 | 10.8 | 15 | 1 | 3 |
| 1997 | DEN | 4 | 12 | 171 | 14.3 | 43 | 1 | 7 |
| 1998 | DEN | 3 | 11 | 190 | 17.3 | 47 | 0 | 9 |
| 2000 | DEN | 1 | 8 | 75 | 9.4 | 16 | 0 | 5 |
| Career | | 14 | 42 | 554 | 13.2 | 47 | 2 | 26 |

== Coaching career ==
=== Valor Christian High School ===
McCaffrey was named the head football coach at Valor Christian High School in February 2018.

=== Northern Colorado ===
On December 12, 2019, the University of Northern Colorado hired McCaffrey as head football coach. He was fired from the position on November 21, 2022.

== Head coaching record ==
=== College ===
| Year | Team | Overall | Conference | Standing | Bowl/playoffs |
|---|---|---|---|---|---|
Northern Colorado Bears (Big Sky Conference) (2020–2022)
| 2020–21 | No team—COVID-19 | | | | |
| 2021 | Northern Colorado | 3–8 | 2–6 | 10th | |
| 2022 | Northern Colorado | 3–8 | 2–6 | T–8th | |
| Northern Colorado: | | 6–16 | 4–12 | | |
| Total: | | 6–16 | | | |

=== High school ===
| Year | Team | Overall | Conference | Standing | Bowl/playoffs |
|---|---|---|---|---|---|
Valor Christian Eagles () (2018–2019)
| 2018 | Valor Christian | 14–0 | 5–0 | 1st | |
| 2019 | Valor Christian | 10–2 | 5–0 | 1st | |
| Valor Christian: | | 24–2 | 10–0 | | |
| Total: | | 24–2 | | | |
National championship Conference title Conference division title or championship game berth

== Life after football ==
McCaffrey began coaching youth football camps in the summer of 2000. In 2011, he founded SportsEddy, which includes not just football but lacrosse, soccer, baseball and basketball camps. The Ed McCaffrey "Dare to Play" football camp and the "Dare to Cheer" cheerleading camp for individuals with Down syndrome are produced in partnership with the Global Down Syndrome Foundation. McCaffrey also founded the McCaffrey Family Foundation with wife Lisa, to assist children whose medical situation has created an academic or financial hardship.

He also has his own brand of mustard and horseradish sauce, which can be found in supermarkets across Colorado and into Nebraska. On July 30, 2012, McCaffrey was named the new color analyst for 850 KOA, flagship station of the Denver Broncos Radio Network, replacing Brian Griese. In 2019, it was announced he would serve as the commissioner of the planned Pacific Pro Football league.

== Personal life ==
McCaffrey is the oldest of five children, with two brothers and two sisters: Monica, who played college basketball at Georgetown University, Billy, who played college basketball at Duke University and Vanderbilt University, Michael, and Meghan.

McCaffrey met his wife, Lisa (Sime), daughter of Olympic sprinter Dave Sime, while they were both students at Stanford University. They have four sons together, all of whom have played football.

Their eldest, Max, was a wide receiver who played college football for the Duke Blue Devils. He was on the rosters of several different NFL teams from 2016 to 2018, and serves as the running backs coach for the Los Angeles Chargers.

Christian McCaffrey was a four-star running back for the Valor Eagles between 2010 and 2014. During that time, he also played wide receiver, cornerback, and punter. He broke numerous Colorado state high school records, including career total touchdowns (141), career all purpose yards (8,845), career touchdown receptions (47), and single season all-purpose yards (3,032). He was the Gatorade Football Player of the Year for Colorado in both 2012 and 2013. He also played basketball. He was a running back for the Stanford Cardinal in 2014, 2015, and 2016, and was the runner-up for the 2015 Heisman Trophy behind Alabama's Derrick Henry in the 2015 voting. He left Stanford a year early after the 2016 season to enter the 2017 NFL draft, where he was selected by the Carolina Panthers with the eighth overall selection in the first round. Christian was later traded to the San Francisco 49ers in the middle of the 2022 season.

Dylan McCaffrey was a four-star quarterback for Valor Christian who graduated in 2017. His team won the Colorado Class 5A state championship, the highest level of play, in three of the four years he played. As the second-ranked quarterback in the country and top-ranked quarterback in Colorado, Dylan received scholarship offers from Duke, Colorado, Rutgers, LSU, Michigan, Washington, UCLA, Colorado State, and Penn State. He committed to play college football at Michigan in February 2016. After graduating from Michigan in December 2020, he played one year at Northern Colorado and received his Master of Business Administration.

McCaffrey's youngest son, Luke McCaffrey, graduated Valor Christian in May 2019. He received football scholarship offers from Michigan and Nebraska. He committed to Nebraska in June 2018. He transferred to Rice University in 2021 and became a wide receiver. Luke was selected by the Washington Commanders in the third round of the 2024 NFL draft.
