= Yards after catch =

Gridiron football statistical measure

Yards after catch (YAC) is a gridiron football statistical measure of the distance gained by a receiver after catching a pass. Specifically, it is the forward yardage gained from the spot of the reception until the receiver is downed, runs out of bounds, scores, or loses the ball. Research by analytics company Pro Football Focus suggests that factors prior to the catch affect YAC, such as the separation a receiver makes from his defender.

== Annual NFL YAC leaders ==
Key
^	Pro Football Hall of Fame member
*	The player is an active player

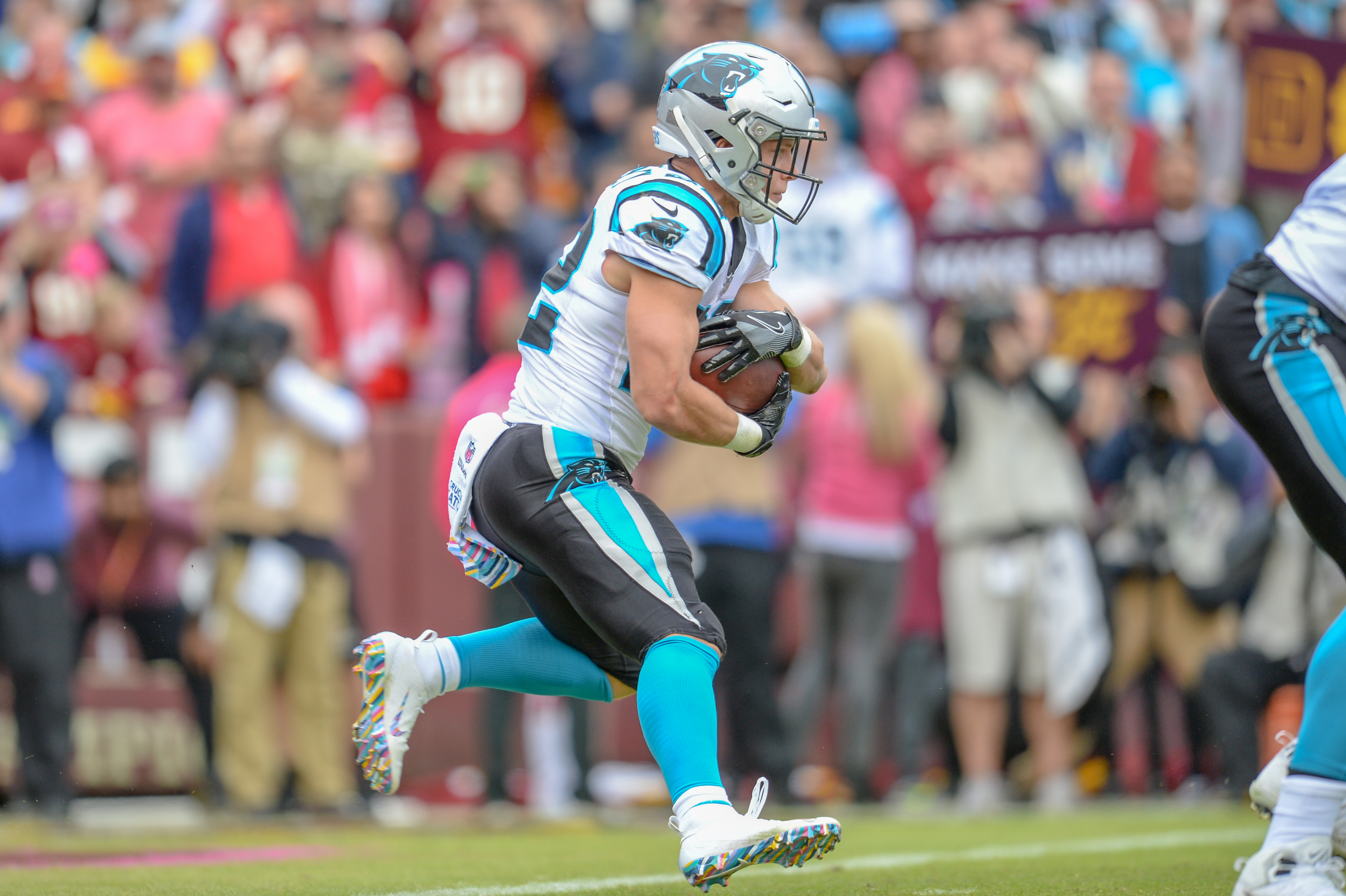
Christian McCaffrey (pictured in 2018) recorded the most yards after catch in a single-season in 2019.

List of National Football League (NFL) single-season receiving yards leaders
Leader	Player	Position	Team	YAC	YDS	GP	Ref.
2018	George Kittle^{*}	Tight end	San Francisco 49ers	870	1,337	16	
2019	Christian McCaffrey^{*}	Running back	Carolina Panthers	1,019	1,005	16	
2020	Alvin Kamara^{*}	Running back	New Orleans Saints	731	756	15	
2021	Cooper Kupp^{*}	Wide receiver	Los Angeles Rams	846	1,947	17	
2022	Austin Ekeler^{*}	Running back	Los Angeles Chargers	843	722	17	
2023	CeeDee Lamb^{*}	Wide receiver	Dallas Cowboys	680	1,749	17	
2024	Ja'Marr Chase^{*}	Wide receiver	Cincinnati Bengals	787	1,708	17	
2025	Bijan Robinson^{*}	Running back	Atlanta Falcons	857	820	17	

== See also ==
- Glossary of American football
