= List of NFL players with a passing, rushing, and receiving touchdown in a single game =

As of February 7, 2026, only 12 players in the history of the National Football League (NFL) have scored a passing, rushing, and receiving touchdown in the same game. This feat is generally achieved by running backs, as their position naturally receives the most carries in a game, is a receiving target in the passing game, and can occasionally throw the ball on halfback option plays. Only one wide receiver, David Patten, has achieved this feat, as wide receivers run the ball much less often than running backs. As neither of these positions generally throw the ball, they require a trick play to throw a touchdown pass. Only one quarterback, Josh Allen, has achieved this feat; although quarterbacks are often required to run the ball, they generally only catch a ball if it is thrown by someone else in a trick play. A passer can be credited with a passing and receiving touchdown on the same play if he passes it to a receiver and the receiver then gives the ball back (either by lateral, backward pass or handoff) to the passer and scores a touchdown, as was the case with Allen, who scored on such a play on a hook and lateral with Amari Cooper.

The first player to achieve this feat was Ray Renfro of the Cleveland Browns on December 6, 1953; the most recent player to do so is Josh Allen of the Buffalo Bills on December 1, 2024.

== List of players ==
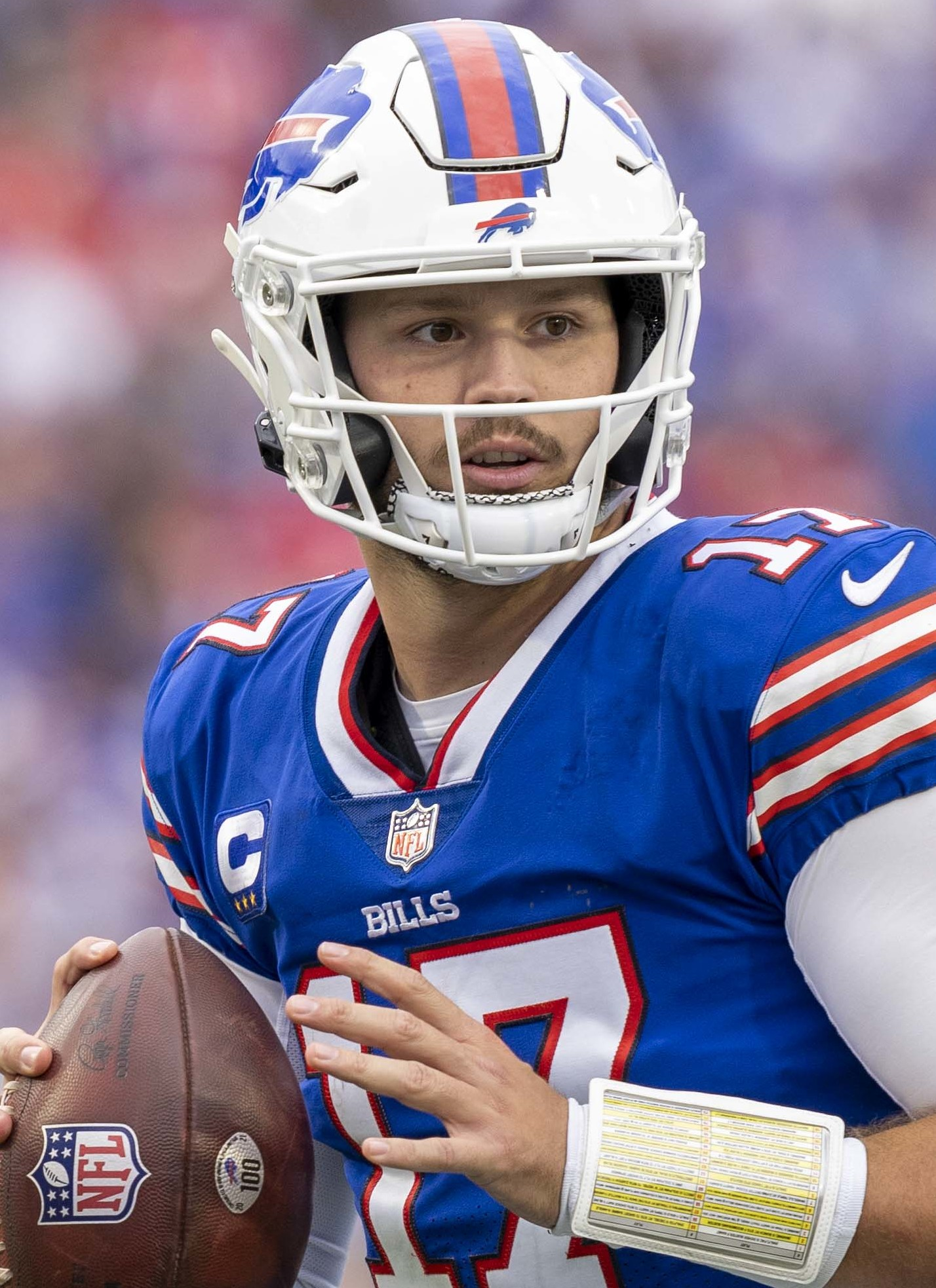
Buffalo Bills quarterback Josh Allen is the most recent player to throw, catch, and run for a touchdown in the same game; he is also the only quarterback to do so.

Key
^	Inducted into the Pro Football Hall of Fame
*	Denotes player who is still active

#	Player	Pos.	Date	Team	Opponent	Game Result	Pass TD	Rush TD	Rec TD	Threw receiving TD	Caught passing TD	Notes	Ref.
1	Ray Renfro	RB	December 6, 1953	Cleveland Browns	New York Giants	W 62–14	1	1	1	Otto Graham^{^}	Pete Brewster		
2	Frank Gifford^{^}	RB^{[a]}	December 2, 1956	New York Giants	Washington Redskins^{[b]}	W 28–14	1	2	1	Charlie Conerly	Ken MacAfee	Contributed to all four Giants touchdowns in this game. Only player on this list with two rushing touchdowns.	
3	Gene Gedman	RB	November 16, 1958	Detroit Lions	San Francisco 49ers	W 35–21	1	1	1	Tobin Rote	Howard Cassady	Threw two passes for 111 yards and a touchdown for a perfect passer rating.	
4	John Henry Johnson^{^}	RB	December 11, 1960	Pittsburgh Steelers	Philadelphia Eagles	W 27–21	1	1	1	Bobby Layne^{^}	Buddy Dial	Achieved feat in the first half.	
5	Keith Lincoln	RB	November 7, 1965	San Diego Chargers^{[c]}	Denver Broncos	W 35–21	1	1	2	John Hadl	Lance Alworth^{^}	Only American Football League (AFL) player to achieve the feat.^{[d]}	
6	Dan Reeves	RB	December 10, 1967	Dallas Cowboys	Philadelphia Eagles	W 38–17	1	1	1	Craig Morton	Lance Rentzel	Cowboys–Eagles rivalry	
7	Harmon Wages	RB	December 7, 1969	Atlanta Falcons	New Orleans Saints	W 45–17	1	1	1	Bob Berry	Paul Flatley	Falcons–Saints rivalry Caught an 88-yard touchdown and rushed for a 66-yard touchdown	
8	Walter Payton^{^}	RB	October 21, 1979	Chicago Bears	Minnesota Vikings	L 30–27	1	1	1	Bob Avellini	Brian Baschnagel	Only time this feat was achieved in a loss.	
9	David Patten	WR	October 21, 2001	New England Patriots	Indianapolis Colts	W 38–17	1	1	2	Tom Brady	Troy Brown	Caught a 91-yard touchdown pass. Achieved feat in the first half. Only wide receiver to achieve the feat.	
10	LaDainian Tomlinson^{^}	RB	October 16, 2005	San Diego Chargers^{[c]}	Oakland Raiders^{[e]}	W 27–14	1	1	1	Drew Brees^{^}	Justin Peelle	Achieved feat in the first half.	
11	Christian McCaffrey*	RB	October 30, 2022	San Francisco 49ers	Los Angeles Rams	W 31–14	1	1	1	Jimmy Garoppolo*	Brandon Aiyuk*		
12	Josh Allen*	QB	December 1, 2024	Buffalo Bills	San Francisco 49ers	W 35–10	2^{[f]}	1	1^{[f]}	Josh Allen*^{[f]}	Josh Allen*^{[f]} Mack Hollins*	Sunday Night Football; Only quarterback to achieve the feat. Only player on this list with two passing touchdowns. Receiving touchdown came on a lateral from Amari Cooper.	

== Notes ==
- ^{^} Played both running back and wide receiver during his career.
- ^{^} Now known as the Washington Commanders.
- ^{^} ^{^} Now known as the Los Angeles Chargers.
- ^{^} The NFL and AFL merged in 1970, and the NFL considers the AFL's history as its own.
- ^{^} Now known as the Las Vegas Raiders.
- ^{^} Threw a pass to Amari Cooper, who lateraled the ball back to Allen. Allen is credited with both a passing touchdown and a receiving touchdown for this play as he both threw the pass and scored the touchdown.
