= Ali Kilponen =

American softball player

Personal information
- Nationality: American
- Born: August 8, 1999 (age 26) Denver, Colorado
- Height: 6 ft 0 in (1.83 m)

Sport
- Country: USA
- Sport: Softball
- College team: LSU

Alexandria Marie Kilponen (born August 8, 1999) is an American softball player. She attended Valor Christian High School in Highlands Ranch, Colorado, where she was named Colorado's state Gatorade Player of the Year in softball for 2018. She later attended Louisiana State University, where she pitched on the LSU Tigers softball team. In her freshman year, Kilponen led LSU softball to a berth in the 2019 NCAA Division I softball tournament Super Regionals, where they lost to Minnesota, 2–0.
