= Valor Christian High School =

Private high school in Highlands Ranch, Colorado

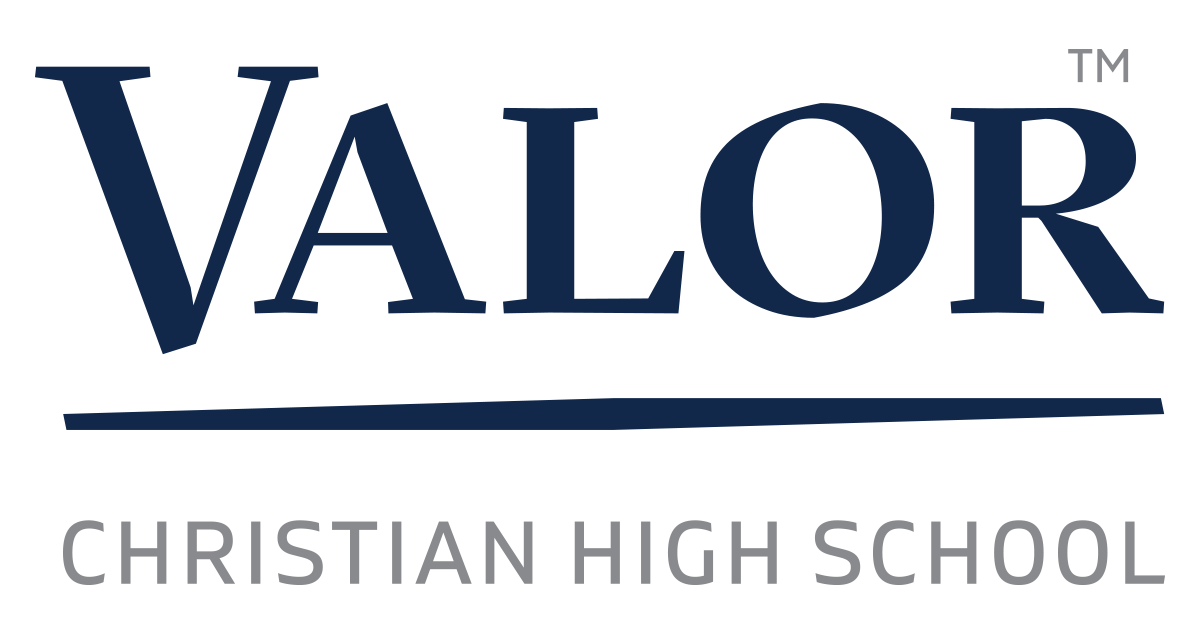

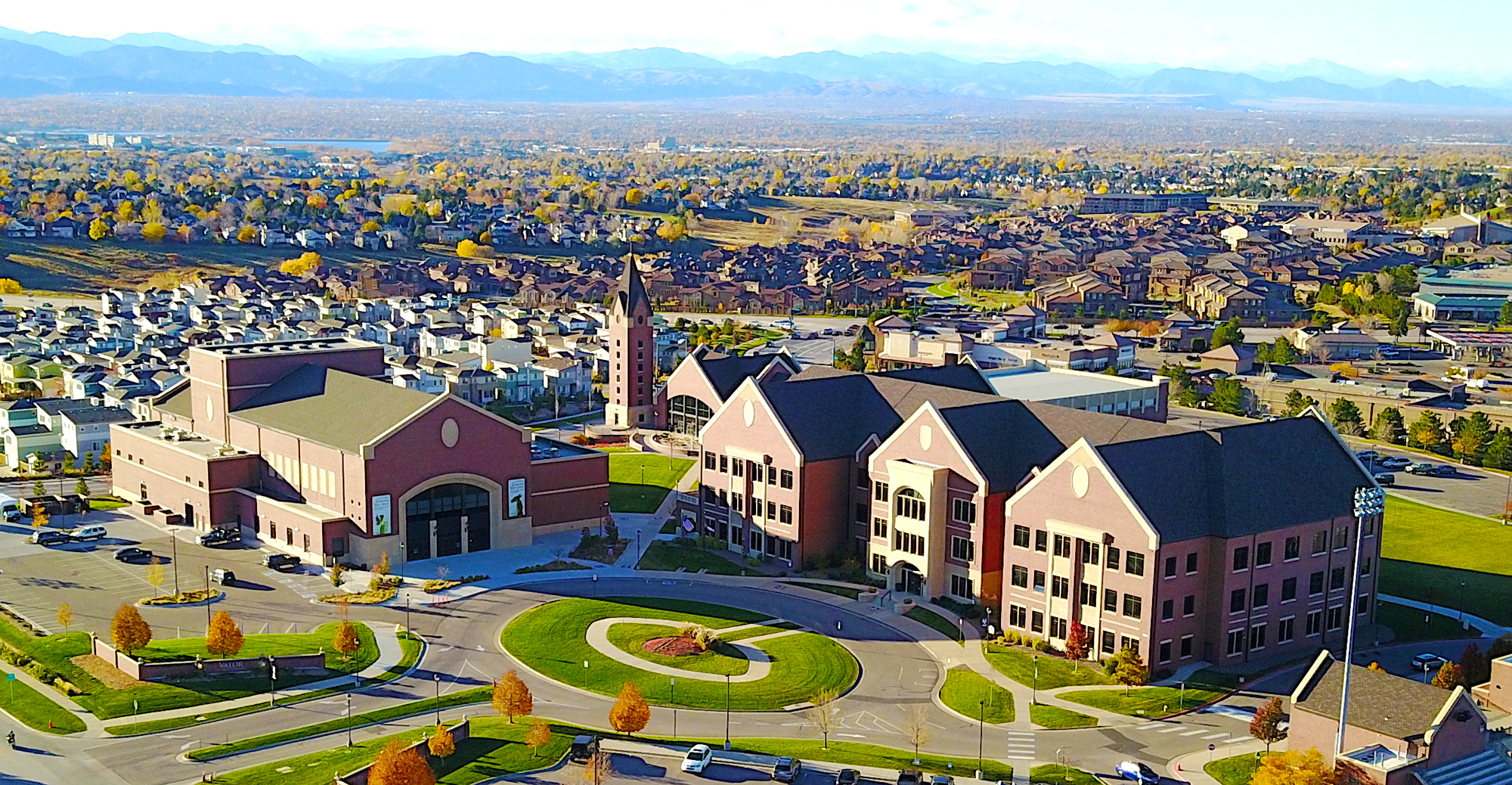
- Main campus as seen from the southeast

Location
- 3775 Grace Boulevard; Highlands Ranch, Colorado 80126; United States; 39°32′26″N 104°56′42″W

Information
- Type: Private, christian, college preparatory
- Motto: Influence Through Excellence
- Religious affiliation: Christian
- Established: 2006
- Founder: C. Edward McVaney
- CEEB code: 060749
- Head of school: Bryan Ritz
- Teaching staff: 101.9 (on an FTE basis)
- Grades: 9–12
- Gender: Co-Educational
- Enrollment: 1,151 (2023–24)
- Student to teacher ratio: 11.6
- Campus type: Suburban
- Colors: Navy blue, Columbia blue, white
- Mascot: Eagle
- Nickname: Eagles
- Tuition: $27,650 (2025-26)
- Website: valorchristian.com

Valor Christian High School is a private, Christian high school in Highlands Ranch, Colorado, United States. The school colors are Navy blue, Columbia blue, and white, and the school nickname is The Eagles. Valor has four major focuses: Academics, Arts, Athletics, and Discovery (missionary outreach).

== Academics ==
Valor Christian has been named a Blue Ribbon school twice. The first time was in 2015 and the second in 2021. Valor Christian was the only Colorado high school named as a National Blue Ribbon School in 2021.

Valor Christian offers a variety of Advanced Placement (AP) courses as well as Dual Credit (DC) courses through certified local universities. As of the 2025–26 school year Valor Christian offers 18 AP Courses and 28 DC courses, with an average ACT score of 25.

== Campus ==
The Valor Christian campus is 35 acres, and consists of: an academic building with a library, labs, and 35 classrooms; the Valor Center for Culture & Influence, including a theatre, performance hall, and studios and classrooms for arts and media; and the athletics facilities, including the athletics building, a 5,200-seat artificial turf stadium, and athletics fields. Plans exist for a STEM Building and Aquatics building, yet the necessary land and funding has not been acquired by the school.

== Arts + Media ==
The school has a robust arts and media program. They offer more than 20 different arts courses. The Valor Center for Culture & Influence hosts more than 40,000 visitors a year in the 700-seat performance hall. Valor's performance hall is the only high school theatre in the state that has a hydraulic orchestra pit and second one in any theatre in the state. Valor also has a conservatory program, for students to take specialized classes and private lessons in their field of study.

Industry experts bring their expertise to the Valor Arts program including Marty Magehee, a founding member of the Grammy nominated group 4Him.

== Athletics ==
The school is known for its sports program, especially football. They have won multiple state championships.

=== State championships ===
Season	Sport	Total Championships	Years
Fall	Cross Country, Boys	1	2022
Fall	Football	8	2009, 2010, 2011, 2012, 2013, 2015, 2016, 2018
Fall	Golf, Boys	6	2009, 2010, 2013, 2014, 2015, 2020
Fall	Softball	3	2014, 2015, 2016
Fall	Volleyball, Girls	5	2018, 2022, 2023, 2024, 2025
Winter	Basketball, Boys	2	2017, 2024
Winter	Basketball, Girls	4	2015, 2016, 2021, 2024
Winter	Hockey	4	2020, 2021, 2023, 2025
Winter	Swimming, Girls	1	2016
Winter	Cheer	7	2016, 2017, 2020, 2021, 2022, 2023, 2024
Spring	Baseball	4	2016, 2017, 2018, 2023
Spring	Lacrosse, Boys	3	2016, 2017, 2024
Spring	Lacrosse, Girls	1	2025
Spring	Track & Field, Boys	1	2019
Spring	Track & Field, Girls	4	2018, 2019, 2021, 2023
Spring	Golf, Girls	4	2022, 2023, 2024, 2025
Spring	Soccer, Girls	1	2011
Total		59	

=== Notable coaching staff ===
Valor has been known to have high-profile coaches. 2 time NCAA Champion Coach and Stanley Cup Finalist Assistant Coach George Gwozdecky has been the Ice hockey coach at Valor since 2015. For the 2018 and 2019 Football seasons Super Bowl Champion Ed McCaffrey was the head coach. Brent Vieselmeyer, now an NFL assistant coach, was head coach at Valor Christian. Four Time World Series Champion Mike Timlin continues to work as an assistant for the Valor baseball team.

== LGBTQ faculty conflicts and student protests ==
In August 2021, volleyball coach Inoke Tonga left Valor after a dispute over his sexuality as a gay man that started when the school became aware of a post he made on Facebook. Inoke states that the school told him to "admit that I wasn't gay and that I was just having what they call a spiritual battle" or leave the school. Tonga said he was told by administrators that "being gay is a 'danger' to the school and to the kids."

After sharing this story, former women's lacrosse coach Lauren Benner said she went through a similar situation in 2020 when administrators confronted her about her sexuality and said she would not "be in alignment with Valor's culture statement" if she pursued a lesbian relationship. Benner initially denied the claims she was in a lesbian relationship and was not dismissed. Several months later Benner left Valor on her own after further conversations about her sexuality with the school.

These stories garnered national media attention, sparked protests from students and parents, and led to other faculty members resigning. Students used the opportunity to share and collect stories of LGBTQ discrimination on campus.

Valor confirmed that all staff must agree to a "Statement of Beliefs" which includes "beliefs pertaining to sexuality and marriage" but disputes Tonga's portrayal of events. An email sent to parents said the school supports those who have spoken out and wants to "find ways to love and serve our community."

== Notable alumni ==
- Janine Beckie, soccer player, 2020 Olympic gold medalist
- Raegan Beers, basketball player for the Oklahoma Sooners
- Rocky Beers, college football tight end for the Oklahoma Sooners
- Meg Boade, soccer player
- Tess Boade, soccer player
- Wyndham Clark, PGA golfer, 2023 U.S. Open champion, 2026 US Open Champion
- Jaelene Daniels, soccer player
- Luke Del Rio, former college football player and NFL coach, current offensive analyst for Washington
- Cori Dyke, soccer player
- Christian Elliss, NFL Linebacker for the New England Patriots
- Noah Elliss, NFL Defensive Tackle
- Anna Hall, professional heptathlete for Adidas
- Ali Kilponen, softball player
- Christian McCaffrey, Pro Bowl NFL running back for the San Francisco 49ers, Holder of 6 NFL Records and 2 NCAA Records and 12 NFL Franchise Records, Cover Athlete for Madden 25
- Luke McCaffrey, NFL wide receiver for the Washington Commanders
- Max McCaffrey, former NFL player, current assistant coach for the Miami Dolphins
- Will Owen, American racing driver
- Roger Rosengarten, NFL tackle for the Baltimore Ravens
- Marybeth Sant-Price, Track and Field World Championship medalist
- Gavin Sawchuk, college football running back for the Northwestern Wildcats

== See also ==
- Bibliography of Colorado
- Geography of Colorado
- History of Colorado
- Index of Colorado-related articles
- List of Colorado-related lists
- Outline of Colorado
