= Dave Sime =

American sprinter and ophthalmologist (1936–2016)

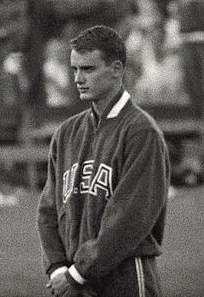
- Sime at the 1960 Olympics

Personal information
- Full name: David William Sime
- Nationality: United States
- Born: July 25, 1936 Paterson, New Jersey, U.S.
- Died: January 12, 2016 (aged 79) Miami, Florida, U.S.
- Education: Duke University
- Occupation: Ophthalmologist
- Height: 6 ft 3 in (191 cm)
- Weight: 195 lb (88 kg)

Sport
- Sport: Track
- Event: Sprinting
- Club: Duke Blue Devils
Medal record
Representing the United States
Olympic Games
Silver medal – second place	1960 Rome	100 m

David William Sime (/sɪm/; July 25, 1936 – January 12, 2016) was an American sprinter and ophthalmologist. He won a silver medal in the 100-meter dash (photo finish) at the 1960 Olympic Games, and held several sprint records during the late 1950s.

== Early life ==
Sime was born on July 25, 1936, in Paterson, New Jersey, the son of Evelyn and Charles Sime, neither of whom graduated from high school. He grew up in Fair Lawn and played football and baseball at Fair Lawn High School, but did not run track. He was a charter member of the Fair Lawn High School Athletics Hall of Fame.

Sime applied to the United States Military Academy at West Point, as his dream was to become a pilot, but discovered he was color blind and accepted a baseball scholarship to Duke University in North Carolina.

== Duke University ==
Sime was a member of Duke's baseball and track and field teams, and played football for a season in 1958 while a first-year medical school student. His beginnings in track were accidental: his 100-yard dash on an unmowed grass surface in baseball shoes was a rapid 9.8 seconds, and the coaches soon asked him to join the track team. Opting not to play freshman football, he had gone out for fall track to stay in shape for baseball. Sime hit over .400 as a freshman and had the intention continuing in baseball for coach Ace Parker, but his success during winter track changed that. Parker was a former multi-sport athlete and recognized the exceptional speed and Olympic potential; Sime focused on track in 1956, then split time between both sports in 1957.

Sime achieved his greatest collegiate victory as a 19-year-old sophomore at the Drake Relays in April 1956, where he was named the meet's outstanding performer after setting a meet record in the 100-yard dash in 9.4 seconds; he handed Bobby Morrow of Abilene Christian his first loss in over thirty races in the 100, and was inducted into the Drake Relays Athlete Hall of Fame in 1959. Sime was named the ACC Athlete of the Year in 1956 for his accomplishments in track and baseball. Prior to the Olympic trials, he and Morrow appeared on the cover of Sports Illustrated in 1956.

Sime was selected by the Detroit Lions in the 29th round (341st overall) of the 1959 NFL draft, but he opted not to play football professionally and continued at medical school.

In 2010, Duke named him their most outstanding athlete of the 20th century.

== Olympics ==
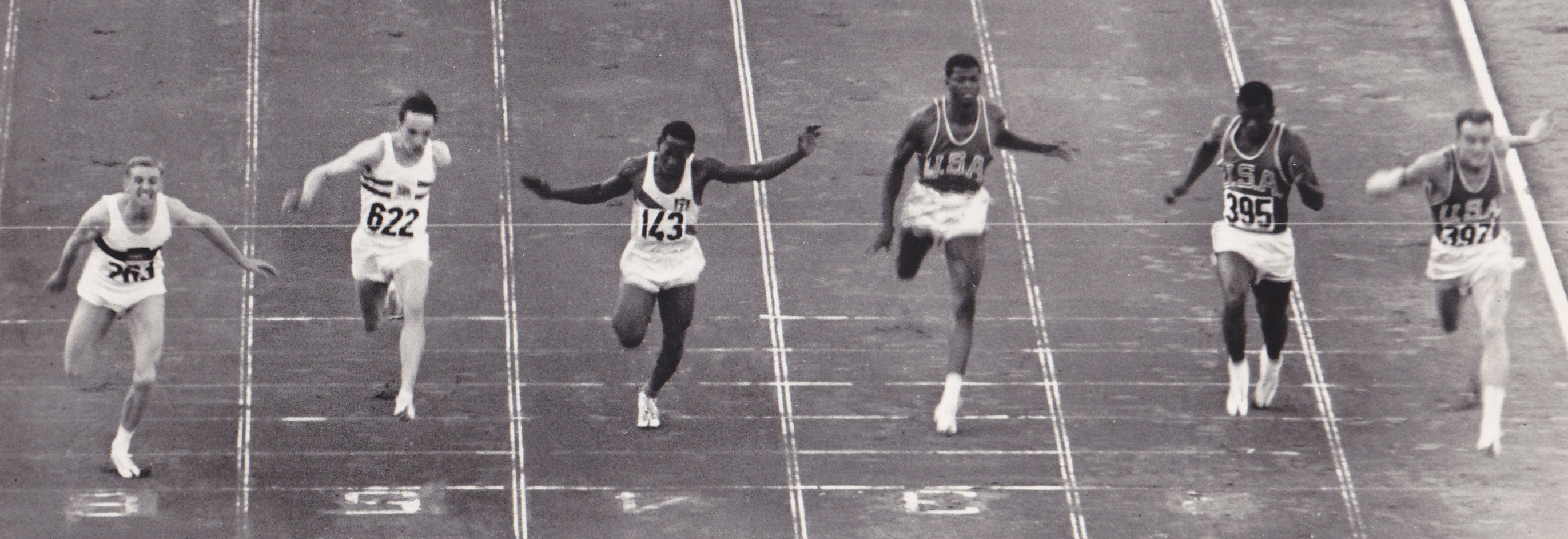
100 m final photo finish at the 1960 Olympics; Sime is at the far right in Lane 1

Sime was unable to make the 1956 Olympics in Melbourne at age twenty due to a leg injury in his first attempt to ride a horse. Four years later (and midway through medical school), he competed in Rome and won a silver medal in the 100 meters, edged out by Armin Hary of Germany in a photo finish.

Sime anchored the U.S. to an apparent victory in the 4 × 100 m relay, posting a world record time of 39.4 seconds. The team was disqualified because at the first exchange from Budd to Norton, Norton started too early and the exchange happened outside the changeover box. During his career, he held world records at 100 yards, 220 yards, and the 220 yd low hurdles.

During the Rome Olympics, Sime worked with the CIA trying to entice Soviet long-jumper Igor Ter-Ovanesyan to defect; the attempt failed.

== Ophthalmology ==
Sime never played sports professionally. He graduated in the top 10% of his class at the Duke University School of Medicine. He then practiced medicine as an ophthalmologist in Florida, where he was a pioneer in intraocular lens implants.

== Personal life ==
Sime's eldest child, Sherrie, went to the University of Virginia, where she was the school's top-ranked singles tennis player. His son Scott was a state wrestling champion and all-state football player at Coral Gables Senior High School before going on to his father's alma mater at Duke, where he was a starting fullback.

Sime's youngest child, Lisa, attended Stanford University, where she was a standout soccer player. There she met her future husband, Ed McCaffrey, a Cardinal wide receiver who went on to win three Super Bowls and a Pro Bowl during a 13-year NFL career. Three of their first four sons (his grandsons): Max, Christian, and Luke McCaffrey, are an American football coach and a former NFL wide receiver, an NFL running back, and an NFL wide receiver, respectively.

Sime died of cancer on January 12, 2016, at the age of 79.
