= Luke McCaffrey =

American football player (born 2001)

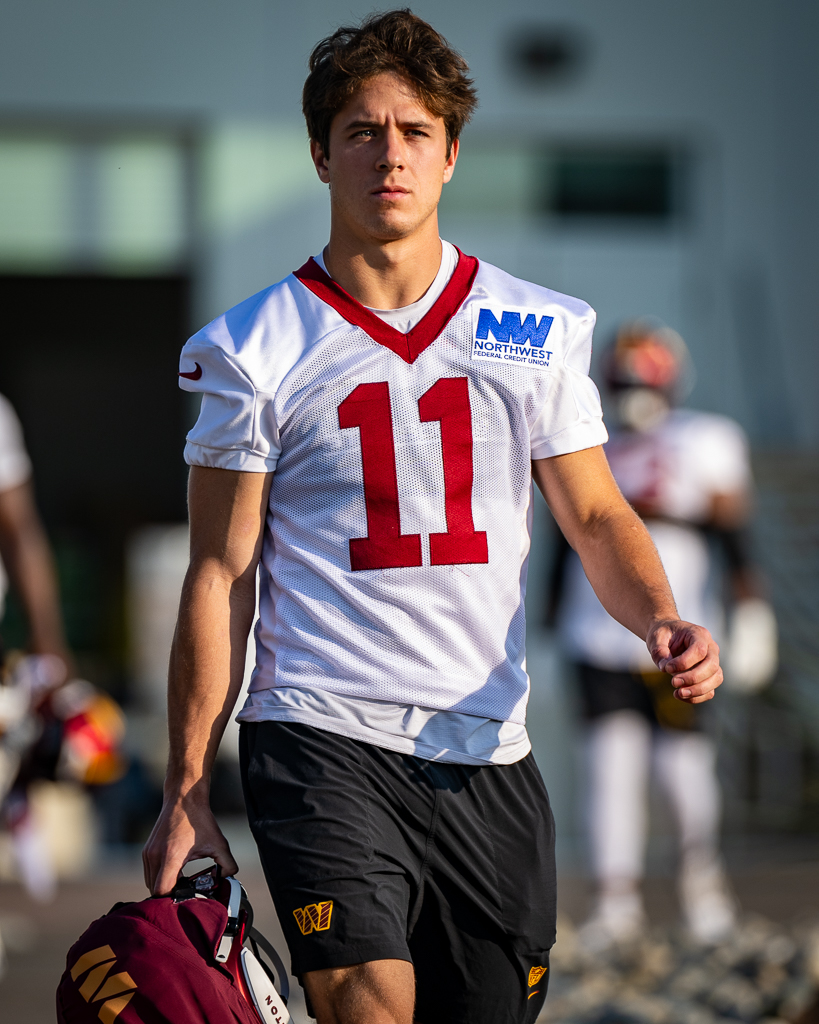
- McCaffrey with the Washington Commanders in 2025

No. 11 – Washington Commanders
- Positions: Wide receiver, Kick returner
- Roster status: Active

Personal information
- Born: April 2, 2001 (age 25); Castle Rock, Colorado, U.S.
- Listed height: 6 ft 2 in (1.88 m)
- Listed weight: 195 lb (88 kg)

Career information
- High school: Valor Christian (Highlands Ranch, Colorado)
- College: Nebraska (2019–2020); Rice (2021–2023)
- NFL draft: 2024: 3rd round, 100th overall pick

Career history
- Washington Commanders (2024–present)

Awards and highlights
- First-team All-AAC (2023)

Career NFL statistics as of Week 10, 2026
- Receptions: 30
- Receiving yards: 377
- Receiving touchdowns: 3
- Return yards: 1,450
- Stats at Pro Football Reference

Luke McCaffrey (born April 2, 2001) is an American professional football wide receiver and kick returner for the Washington Commanders of the National Football League (NFL). He played college football for the Nebraska Cornhuskers and Rice Owls, originally at quarterback before switching to wide receiver at Rice. McCaffrey was selected by the Commanders in the third round of the 2024 NFL draft. A member of the McCaffrey football family, he is the son of Ed and the youngest brother of Max, Christian, and Dylan McCaffrey.

== Early life ==
McCaffrey was born on April 2, 2001, in Highlands Ranch, Colorado. He attended Valor Christian High School, where he played for his father. He mostly played wide receiver and defensive back during his first two years of high school while his brother, Dylan, was Valor Christian's starting quarterback. McCaffrey caught 47 passes for 717 yards and nine touchdowns as a sophomore. He split quarterbacking duties during his junior season and completed 76 percent of his passes for 878 yards with six touchdowns and three interceptions. McCaffrey passed for 2,202 yards with 21 touchdowns and four interceptions while also rushing for 526 yards and eight touchdowns as Valor Christian went undefeated and won the Class 5A state championship. McCaffrey was rated a four-star recruit, and committed to play college football at Nebraska over offers from Colorado, Colorado State, Michigan, Ohio State, UCLA, and Mississippi.

== College career ==
=== Nebraska (2019–2021) ===
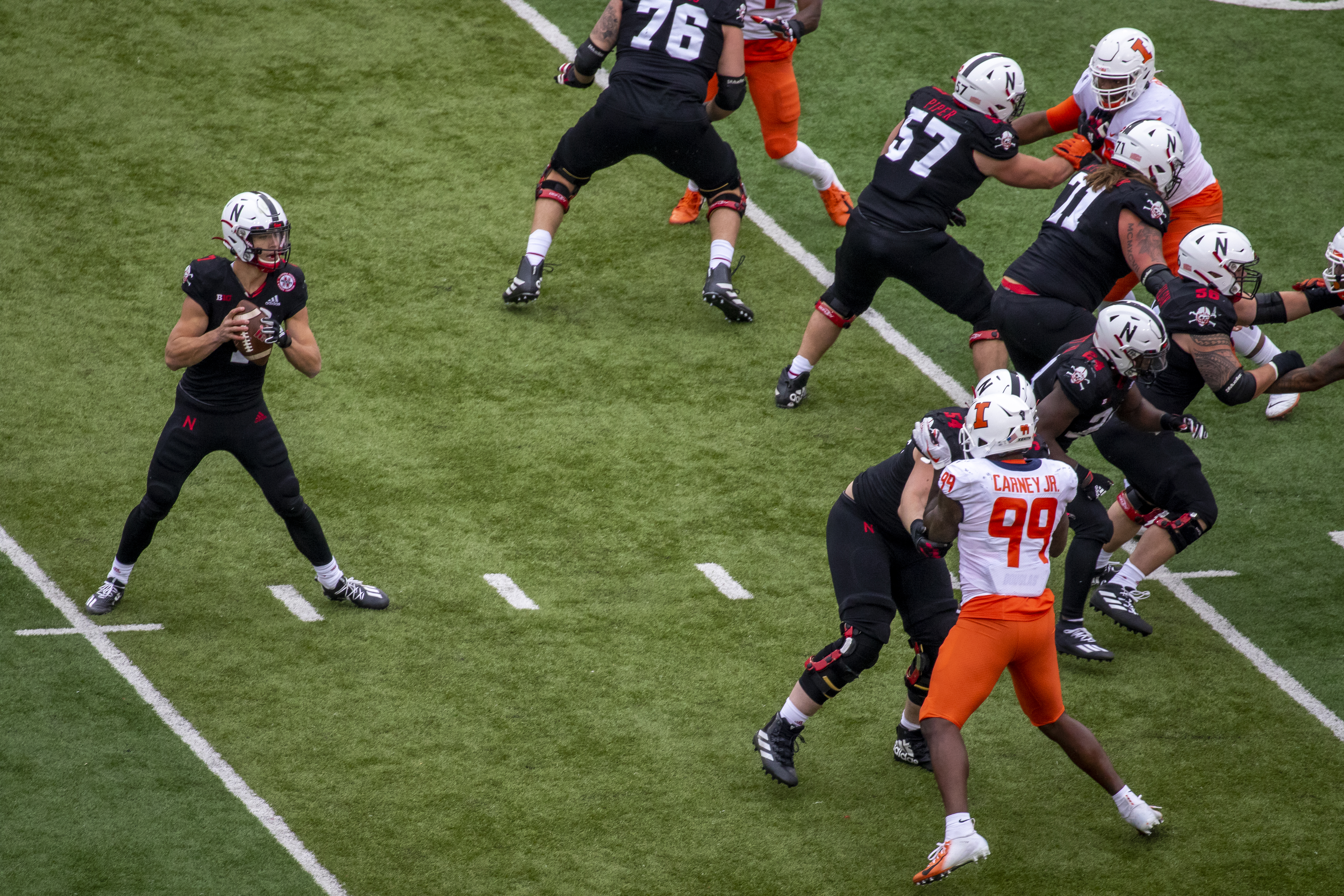
McCaffrey (left) playing quarterback for Nebraska during a game against Illinois in 2020

McCaffrey joined the Nebraska Cornhuskers as an early enrollee. He saw his first significant playing time in a 38–31 loss to Indiana, replacing Noah Vedral following an injury and completing 5 of 6 pass attempts for 71 yards and one touchdown while also rushing 12 times for 76 yards. McCaffrey finished the season with 142 passing yards and two touchdown passes in four games while maintaining a redshirt for the year. He competed to be the Cornhuskers' starting quarterback in 2020, but Adrian Martinez was chosen to be the starter. McCaffrey made his first career start on November 14, 2020, against Penn State and completed 13 of 21 pass attempts for 152 yards and one touchdown while also rushing for 67 yards and one touchdown. He was benched in favor of Martinez after Nebraska lost 41–23 to Illinois. McCaffrey played in seven games with two starts in 2020 and completed 48 of 76 pass attempts for 466 yards and one touchdown with six interceptions and rushed 65 times for 364 yards and three touchdowns. Following the end of the season, McCaffrey entered the NCAA transfer portal.

=== Rice (2021–2023) ===
McCaffrey initially transferred to Louisville but left the program after several months to join the Rice Owls. McCaffrey competed with Wiley Green for the starting quarterback job entering his first season with the team. He played in nine games with three starts. McCaffrey moved to wide receiver during spring practices in 2022. He finished the season as the Owls' leading receiver with 58 receptions for 723 yards and six touchdowns despite missing the final three games of the regular season due to an ankle injury and also rushed for 147 yards and one touchdown.

== Professional career ==
Pre-draft measurables
Height	Weight	Arm length	Hand span	Wingspan	40-yard dash	10-yard split	20-yard split	20-yard shuttle	Three-cone drill	Vertical jump	Broad jump
6 ft 1 5/8 in (1.87 m)	198 lb (90 kg)	30 1/8 in (0.77 m)	9 5/8 in (0.24 m)	6 ft 2 1/2 in (1.89 m)	4.46 s	1.52 s	2.62 s	4.02 s	6.70 s	36.0 in (0.91 m)	10 ft 1 in (3.07 m)
All values from NFL Combine

=== 2024 season ===
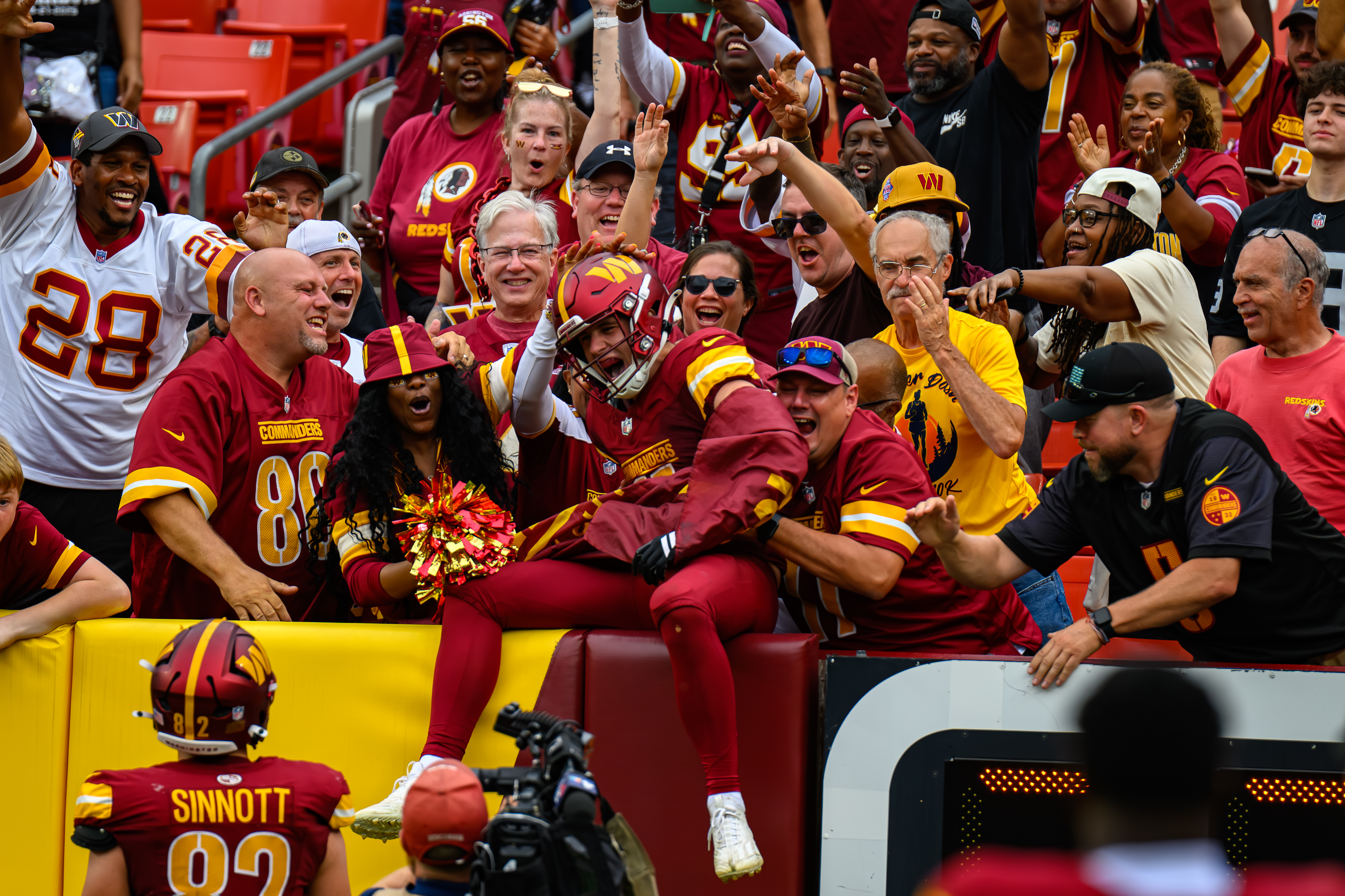
McCaffrey celebrating after scoring his first NFL touchdown against the Las Vegas Raiders during the 2025 season.

McCaffrey was selected by the Washington Commanders in the third round (100th overall) of the 2024 NFL draft; the pick was acquired in a trade that sent Chase Young to the San Francisco 49ers the previous season. He signed his four-year rookie contract on May 10, 2024.

McCaffrey made his NFL debut in Week 1 of the 2024 season against the Tampa Bay Buccaneers, recording three receptions for 18 yards in the loss. He made his first NFL start the following week against the New York Giants in a victory. In Week 3 against the Cincinnati Bengals, he recorded three receptions for a season-high 44 yards in the win. Later in the season, he saw an increased role on special teams, including a season-high six kickoff returns for 184 yards in a Week 16 victory over the Philadelphia Eagles. On the season, he appeared in all 17 regular-season games with four starts, recording 18 receptions for 168 yards while adding 10 kickoff returns for 299 yards. McCaffrey also appeared in all three playoff games. In the Wild Card victory over Tampa Bay, he returned two kickoffs for 60 yards. He added two kickoff returns for 49 yards in the NFC Championship Game against Philadelphia, finishing the postseason with four kickoff returns for 109 yards.

=== 2025 season ===
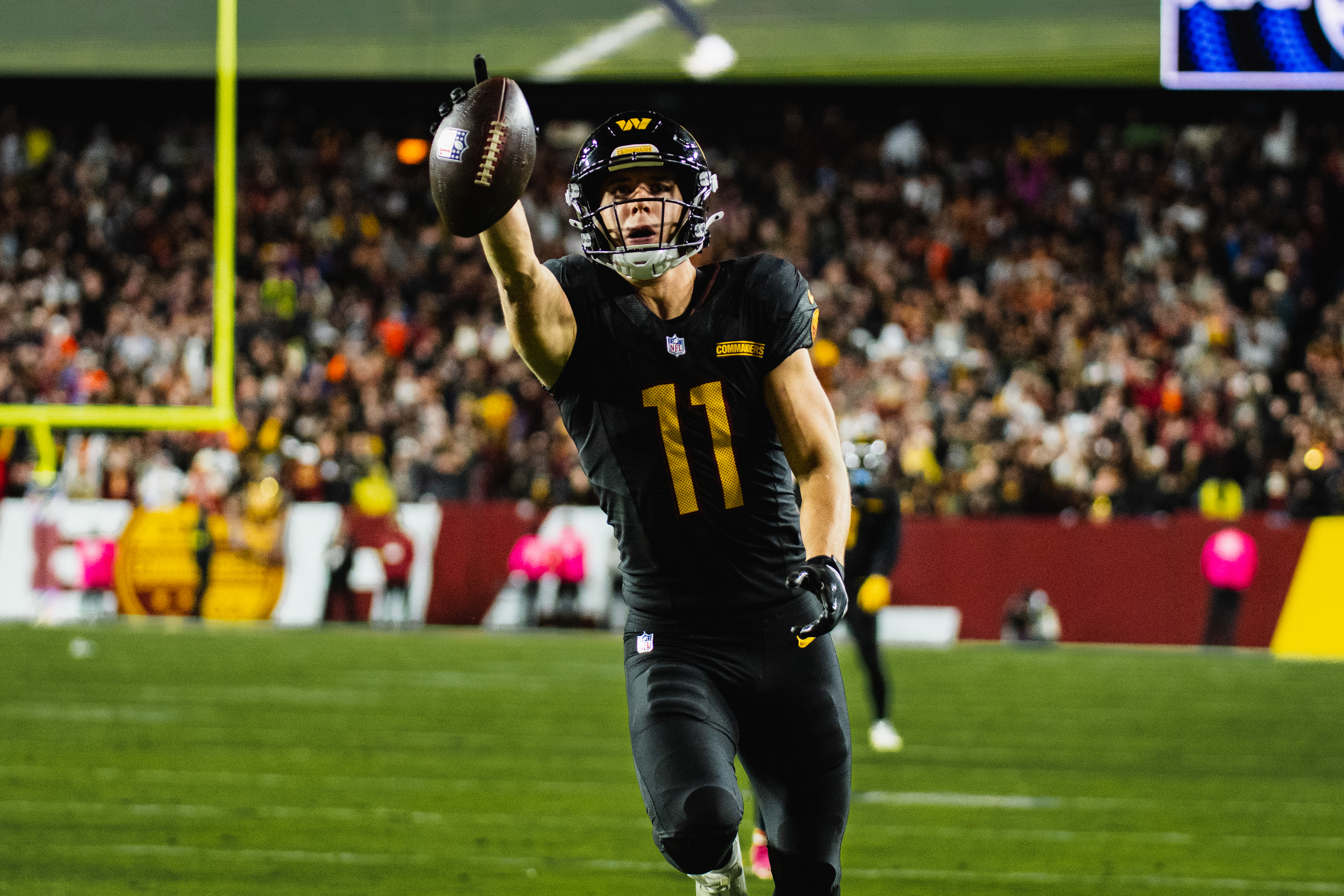
McCaffrey scoring a touchdown against the Chicago Bears during the 2025 season.

In Week 3 of the 2025 season, McCaffrey caught three passes for 56 receiving yards and scored his first career touchdown in the 41–24 victory over the Las Vegas Raiders. The following week against the Atlanta Falcons, he had two receptions for 21 yards and a touchdown in the loss while returning six kickoffs for 199 yards. In Week 6 against the Chicago Bears, he caught a 33-yard touchdown pass and returned four kickoffs for 127 yards in the loss. The following week against the Dallas Cowboys, he recorded a career-high eight kickoff returns for 209 yards in the loss. On November 4, 2025, he was placed on injured reserve after suffering a broken collarbone on the opening drive of the team's Week 9 game against the Seattle Seahawks. On the season, he appeared in nine games, recording 11 receptions for 203 yards and three touchdowns. On special teams, he returned 26 kickoffs for 769 yards and made five tackles.

== Career statistics ==
=== NFL ===
NFL statistics
Year	Team	Games		Receiving					Kick returns					Fumbles	
Year	Team	GP	GS	Rec	Yds	Avg	Lng	TD	Ret	Yds	Avg	Lng	TD	Fum	Lost
2024	WAS	17	4	18	168	9.3	30	0	10	299	29.9	47	0	0	0
2025	WAS	9	0	11	203	18.5	50	3	26	769	29.6	58	0	0	0
Career		26	4	29	371	12.8	50	3	36	1,068	29.7	58	0	0	0

=== College ===
Season	Team	Games			Passing								Rushing				Receiving			
Season	Team	GP	GS	Record (Note: Accounts for only GS as a QB. In 2022 and 2023 McCaffrey started multiple at WR.)	Cmp	Att	Pct	Yds	Y/A	TD	Int	Rtg	Att	Yds	Avg	TD	Rec	Yds	Avg	TD
2019	Nebraska	4	0	—	9	12	75.0	142	11.8	2	0	229.4	24	166	6.9	1	1	12	12.0	0
2020	Nebraska	7	2	1–1	48	76	63.2	466	6.1	1	6	103.2	65	364	5.6	3	1	5	5.0	0
2021	Rice	9	3	1–2	31	62	50	313	5.0	2	4	90.1	41	132	3.2	2	–	–	–	–
2022	Rice	11	10	—	–	–	–	–	–	–	–	–	12	148	12.3	1	58	723	12.5	6
2023	Rice	13	13	—	0	2	0.0	0	0.0	0	0	0.0	15	117	7.8	0	71	992	14.0	13
Career		44	28	2–3	88	152	57.9	921	6.1	5	10	106.5	157	927	5.9	7	131	1,732	13.2	19

== Personal life ==
McCaffrey is Catholic. His father, Ed McCaffrey, played wide receiver in the National Football League (NFL) for the New York Giants, San Francisco 49ers, and Denver Broncos and was formerly the head coach for the Northern Colorado Bears football team. His older brother, Christian, currently plays running back in the NFL for the San Francisco 49ers. Another brother, Max, played wide receiver at Duke and in the NFL for several teams, and his brother Dylan was the starting quarterback at Northern Colorado after beginning his college career at Michigan. His maternal grandfather, Dave Sime, won a silver medal in the 100 meter at the 1960 Olympic Games.
