= Mike Dawson (American football coach) =

American football player and coach (born 1977)

Current position
- Title: Defensive Run Game Coordinator & Edge Coach
- Team: UCF
- Conference: Big 12

Biographical details
- Born: August 23, 1977 (age 49); Nashua, New Hampshire, U.S.

Playing career
- 1994–1997: UMass
- Position: Defensive end

Coaching career (HC unless noted)
- 1998: UMass Lowell (asst. DL)
- 1998: Maine (asst. DL)
- 1999: Pittsburgh (GA)
- 2000: New Hampshire (LB)
- 2001: New Hampshire (OL)
- 2002–2003: New Hampshire (LB)
- 2004–2005: New Hampshire (DC/LB)
- 2006–2008: Akron (LB)
- 2009–2011: Boston College (ST)
- 2013: Philadelphia Eagles (DQC)
- 2014–2015: Philadelphia Eagles (DL)
- 2016–2017: UCF (DL)
- 2018: Nebraska (DL)
- 2019: New York Giants (OLB)
- 2020: Nebraska (LB)
- 2021: Nebraska (OLB/EDGE)
- 2022: Nebraska (DL/EDGE)
- 2023: Ohio State (SA/DA)
- 2024: Kansas (DA)
- 2025–present: UCF (DRGC/EDGE)

Mike Dawson (born August 23, 1977) is an American college football coach and former edge rusher. He is the Defensive run game coordinator and Edge coach for the University of Central Florida (UCF). He previously served as an assistant coach for several college football and NFL teams.

== Playing career ==
Dawson was a three-year starter at UMass, where he played outside linebacker and defensive end from 1994 to 1996. He graduated UMass with a bachelor's degree in sports management in 1997.

== Coaching career ==
=== Early career ===
Dawson began his coaching career as UMass-Lowell's defensive line coach in the spring of 1998, before joining Maine as a defensive assistant for the 1998 season. Dawson soon after served as a graduate assistant at University of Pittsburgh (Pitt) in 1999. Dawson was hired by New Hampshire in 2000. He was the Wildcats' linebackers coach in 2000 and 2002–03, offensive line coach in 2001, and defensive coordinator in 2004 and 2005. During his two seasons as defensive coordinator, New Hampshire went 21-5 and advanced to the FCS quarterfinals in 2005, when the Wildcats led the NCAA with 45 takeaways.

He had stints in assistant roles at Akron, coaching linebackers, and at Boston College as the special teams coordinator.

=== Philadelphia Eagles ===
In 2013, the Philadelphia Eagles hired him as a defensive quality control coach in the NFL. From 2014 to 2015, he would coach the Philadelphia Eagles defensive line. During his time with the Eagles they won the NFC East and finished third in the NFL with 31 takeaways. In 2014, Dawson helped Philadelphia finish second in the NFL in sacks (49) and eighth in opponent yards per carry (3.7).

=== UCF (first stint) ===
Dawson was hired as defensive line coach by the University of Central Florida in January 2016. Dawson's defensive line helped UCF achieve its first undefeated season in program history, finishing 13-0 and the nation's only undefeated team after winning the NY6 Peach Bowl. The Knights finished third in the league for scoring defense and fourth in rushing defense. UCF ranked third nationally in turnovers forced, including 23 fumbles, in which the defensive line played a key factor. Two of three starting defensive linemen received all-conference honors, including defensive lineman Jamiyus Pittman, who made the Outland Trophy watch list and was named All-AAC for the second consecutive season, and sophomore Trysten Hill was named All-AAC honors as well.

=== New York Giants ===
Dawson spent the 2019 season as the New York Giants' outside linebackers coach. Dawson helped Markus Golden have a stellar year, as Golden recorded a career-high 68 tackles. Golden also had 10.0 sacks, the second most in his career, and scored his first defensive touchdown. Dawson also helped guide Oshane Ximines rack up 4.5 sacks in his rookie season.

=== Nebraska ===
In his first year at Nebraska, his defensive line featured two All-Big Ten performances, and he helped lead a Nebraska squad that jumped 27 ranks in the national scoring defense rankings from the previous season. The line helped Nebraska record 25 sacks, 11 more than the previous season.

In addition to the defensive line's pressure, the unit contributed to the Huskers' ninth-highest pass breakup total in school history. Dawson's outside linebackers helped Nebraska rank in the top of the Big Ten Conference in overall defense in 2020, as well as reduce opponents' rushing yards per attempt. JoJo Domann, an outside linebacker, led the team with 58 tackles and 6.5 tackles for loss, earning All-Big Ten accolades.

Dawson contributed significantly to the Nebraska defense's ongoing progress in 2021. Nebraska allowed the fewest points in 11 seasons, with 22.7 per game. The Huskers also allowed the fewest yards per game in five seasons (366.0 per game).

Dawson mentored and helped develop outside linebackers Caleb Tannor and Garrett Nelson. Tannor concluded the season with a career-high 5.5 tackles for loss, while Nelson led Nebraska in TFLs (10.5) and sacks (5), placing among the Big Ten leaders in both.

Dawson was the defensive line and edge rushers coach at Nebraska in 2022. Nelson led Nebraska in TFLs (9.0) and sacks (5.5), while former walk-on Colton Feist had a breakout season as a starter, recording 46 tackles and 7.0 tackles for loss. Ochaun Mathis finished the season with 48 tackles amongst the top on team. Dawson's guys contributed 34.5 of Nebraska's 60 TFLs this season, as well as 15 of the Huskers' 21 sacks. Mathis would be drafted in sixth round if 2023 Draft. Dawson would coach several NFL/pro players which included: Freedom Akinmoladun, Darrion Daniels, Casey Rogers, Chris Kolarevic, Ben Stille, Eteva Mauga-Clements, Pheldarius Payne, Damian Jackson, Luke Gifford, JoJo Domann Carlos Davis, Khalil Davis, Jordon Riley, Ochaun Mathis.

=== Ohio State ===
At Ohio State, he was hired as an assistant to serve as a senior advisor for Defense, working with strongside "Sam" linebackers and defensive alignment. Ohio State finished 11–2 in the Cotton Bowl Classic.

=== UCF (second stint) ===
Dawson was brought back to UCF in December 2024 to rejoin newly hired Head Coach Scott Frost
