= Erik Chinander =

American football player and coach (born 1979)

Current position
- Title: Defensive coordinator & defensive line coach
- Team: Boise State
- Conference: Pac-12

Biographical details
- Born: December 19, 1979 (age 46); Allison, Iowa, U.S.

Playing career
- 1998–2002: Iowa
- Position: Offensive lineman

Coaching career (HC unless noted)
- 2003: Ellsworth (OL/DL)
- 2004–2009: Northern Iowa (TE/RC)
- 2010–2012: Oregon (GA)
- 2013: Philadelphia Eagles (asst. DL)
- 2014–2015: Oregon (OLB)
- 2016–2017: UCF (DC)
- 2018–2022: Nebraska (DC)
- 2023: Boise State (AHC/DRGC/DL)
- 2024–present: Boise State (DC/DL)

Erik Chinander (born December 19, 1979) is an American football coach. He is currently the defensive coordinator at Boise State University.

== Coaching career ==
Following his playing career at the University of Iowa, Chinander went onto coaching at Ellsworth and Northern Iowa.

=== Philadelphia Eagles ===
In 2013, he was the assistant defensive line coach for the NFC East champion Philadelphia Eagles.

=== Oregon ===
Chinander coached outside linebackers for Oregon in 2014 and 2015. The Ducks had 34 takeaways in 2014 and competed in the 2015 College Football Playoff National Championship. Chinander previously served as a graduate assistant with Oregon (2010–12). During his five seasons with the Ducks, Oregon went 58–10, won three Pac-12 championships, and twice competed for the national championship. Chinander coached notable outside linebackers Justin Hollins, Joe Walker, and Henry Mondeaux, who all went on to play professionally in the National Football League (NFL).

=== UCF ===
He spent two years as the defensive coordinator at the University of Central Florida (UCF) under Scott Frost, including the unbeaten 2017 UCF team, which was placed sixth in the final AP Poll. The Knights ranked 18th and 2nd nationally in takeaways during his two seasons with the team. He coached several successful players that went on to the NFL, including Shaquill Griffin, Jamiyus Pittman, Nevelle Clarke, and Trysten Hill. Cornerback Mike Hughes earned All-America honors prior to becoming a first-round NFL draft pick. Shaquem Griffin, a linebacker, received All-America accolades and was named the AAC Defensive Player of the Year. He was later taken in the fifth round of the 2018 NFL draft.

=== Nebraska ===
Chinander followed Scott Frost to Nebraska from 2018–2022. In 2021, Nebraska finished 36th nationally in scoring defense in 2021, allowing 22.7 points per game against eight teams that won at least nine games. The Cornhuskers' points-per-game average was their best since 2010. The Associated Press named Nickel JoJo Domann as an All-American. Chinander was named a top 25 recruiter by Rivals in 2021.

Multiple players went onto the NFL after his tutelage at Nebraska, including Dicaprio Bootle, Luke Gifford, Quinton Newsome, Casey Rogers, Jordon Riley, Isaiah Stalbird, Deontai Williams, Pheldarius Payne, Freedom Akinmoladun, Chris Kolarevic, Eteva Mauga-Clements, Lamar Jackson (cornerback), and Ben Stille. This includes four draft picks: Cam Taylor-Britt (2nd round), Ochaun Mathis (6th round), Khalil Davis (6th round), and Carlos Davis (7th round).

=== Boise State ===
In December 2022, Chinander was hired by Boise State and served as Assistant Head Coach/Defensive Run Game Coordinator and defensive line coach. In his first season, he worked under head coach Andy Avalos for the first ten games before Spencer Danielson took over as Interim Head Coach for the remainder of season. Boise State concluded the season winning the 2023 Mountain West Conference Championship, defeating UNLV. In 2023, Boise State was 14th in the nation at Rushing Attempts per Game on Defense with one of the top defensive line fronts. Defensive Lineman Ahmed Hassanein was selected First-Team All-Mountain West, while edge rusher Andrew Simpson was named Second-Team All-Mountain West.

The following season, Chinander was named defensive coordinator by head coach Spencer Danielson. In 2024, Boise State went on to win another Mountain West Conference Championship and compete in the inaugural 12-team College Football Playoff. Boise State ranked as #3 seed in the bracket. Boise State's defense finished as the 2nd most sacks in the nation (51) and the most sack yardage in the nation (347), including the #13 red zone defense in the nation.
