= 2019 Nebraska Cornhuskers football team =

American college football season

2019 Nebraska Cornhuskers football
- Conference: Big Ten Conference
- West Division
- Record: 5–7 (3–6 Big Ten)
- Head coach: Scott Frost (2nd season)
- Offensive coordinator: Troy Walters (2nd season)
- Offensive scheme: No-huddle spread option
- Defensive coordinator: Erik Chinander (2nd season)
- Base defense: 3–4
- Home stadium: Memorial Stadium

Uniform
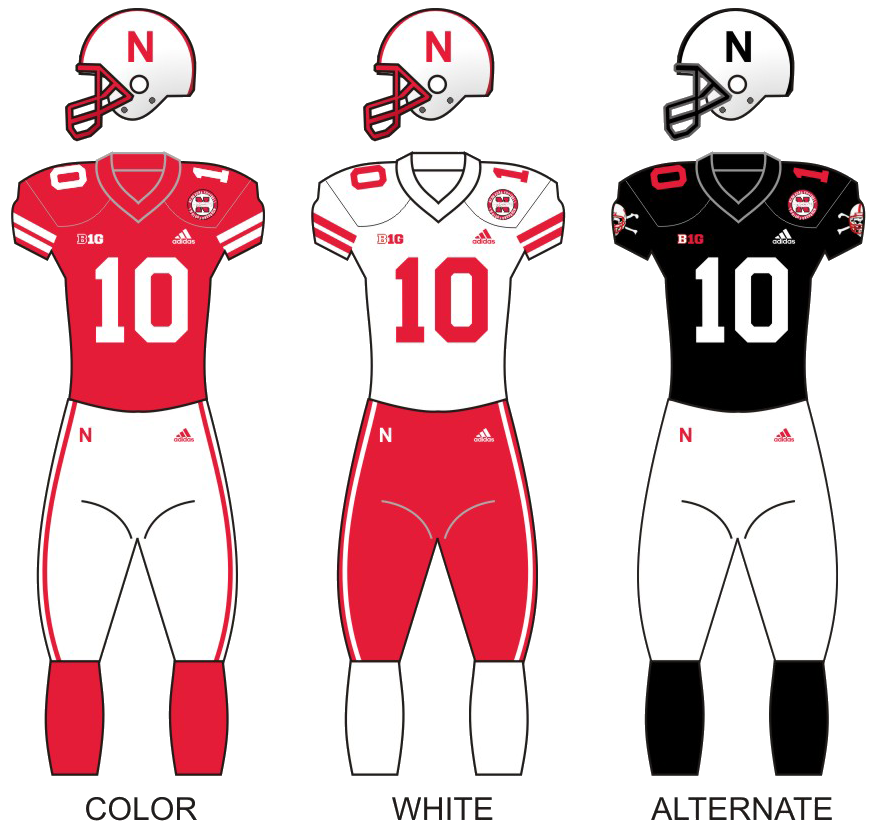

2019 Big Ten Conference football standings
	Conf.			Overall
Team	W		L	W		L
East Division
No. 3 Ohio State xy$^	9	–	0	13	–	1
No. 9 Penn State	7	–	2	11	–	2
No. 18 Michigan	6	–	3	9	–	4
Indiana	5	–	4	8	–	5
Michigan State	4	–	5	7	–	6
Maryland	1	–	8	3	–	9
Rutgers	0	–	9	2	–	10
West Division
No. 11 Wisconsin xy	7	–	2	10	–	4
No. 10 Minnesota x	7	–	2	11	–	2
No. 15 Iowa	6	–	3	10	–	3
Illinois	4	–	5	6	–	7
Purdue	3	–	6	4	–	8
Nebraska	3	–	6	5	–	7
Northwestern	1	–	8	3	–	9
Championship: Ohio State 34, Wisconsin 21
^ – College Football Playoff participant; $ – Conference champion; x – Division champion/co-champions; y – Championship game participant; Rankings from AP Poll

The 2019 Nebraska Cornhuskers football team represented the University of Nebraska–Lincoln in the 2019 NCAA Division I FBS football season. The team was coached by second-year head coach Scott Frost and played their home games at Memorial Stadium in Lincoln, Nebraska. They were members of the West Division of the Big Ten Conference. They finished the season 5–7, 3–6 in Big Ten play to finish in a tie for fifth place in the West Division.

== Offseason ==
=== Recruiting ===
==== Position key ====
Back	B	Center	C	Cornerback	CB	Defensive back	DB
Defensive end	DE	Defensive lineman	DL	Defensive tackle	DT	End	E
Fullback	FB	Guard	G	Halfback	HB	Kicker	K
Kickoff returner	KR	Offensive tackle	OT	Offensive lineman	OL	Linebacker	LB
Long snapper	LS	Punter	P	Punt returner	PR	Quarterback	QB
Running back	RB	Safety	S	Tight end	TE	Wide receiver	WR

==== Recruits ====
The Cornhuskers signed a total of 24 scholarship recruits during the Early Signing Period on December 19, 2018.

===== Scholarship recruits =====
College recruiting (2019)
Name	Hometown	School	Height	Weight	Commit date
Matthew Anderson; OT	Leesville, LA	Leesville	6 ft 7 in (2.01 m)	250 lb (110 kg)	Dec 19, 2018
Matthew Anderson; OT	Recruit ratings: Rivals: 247Sports: ESPN: (75)				
Brant Banks; OT	Houston, TX	Westbury Christian School	6 ft 7 in (2.01 m)	265 lb (120 kg)	Dec 19, 2018
Brant Banks; OT	Recruit ratings: Rivals: 247Sports: ESPN: (75)				
Bryce Benhart; OT	Lakeville, MN	Lakville North	6 ft 8 in (2.03 m)	305 lb (138 kg)	Dec 19, 2018
Bryce Benhart; OT	Recruit ratings: Rivals: 247Sports: ESPN: (81)				
Darien Chase; ATH	Vancouver, WA	Union	6 ft 1 in (1.85 m)	185 lb (84 kg)	Dec 19, 2018
Darien Chase; ATH	Recruit ratings: Rivals: 247Sports: ESPN: (77)				
Myles Farmer; S	Atlanta, GA	Westlake	6 ft 3 in (1.91 m)	194 lb (88 kg)	Dec 19, 2018
Myles Farmer; S	Recruit ratings: Rivals: 247Sports: ESPN: (77)				
Jimmy Fritzsche; OT	Greenville, SC	Greenville	6 ft 7 in (2.01 m)	240 lb (110 kg)	Dec 19, 2018
Jimmy Fritzsche; OT	Recruit ratings: Rivals: 247Sports: ESPN: (NR)				
Jamin Graham; DE	Atalla, AL	Etowah	6 ft 5 in (1.96 m)	225 lb (102 kg)	Dec 19, 2018
Jamin Graham; DE	Recruit ratings: Rivals: 247Sports: ESPN: (78)				
Jackson Hannah; LB	Nashville, TN	Montgomery Bell Academy	6 ft 3 in (1.91 m)	220 lb (100 kg)	Dec, 19, 2018
Jackson Hannah; LB	Recruit ratings: Scout: Rivals: 247Sports: ESPN: (78)				
Nick Henrich; LB	Omaha, NE	Omaha Burke	6 ft 4 in (1.93 m)	210 lb (95 kg)	Dec 19, 2018
Nick Henrich; LB	Recruit ratings: Rivals: 247Sports: ESPN: (80)				
Chris Hickman; TE	Omaha, NE	Omaha Burke	6 ft 5 in (1.96 m)	205 lb (93 kg)	Dec 19, 2018
Chris Hickman; TE	Recruit ratings: Rivals: 247Sports: ESPN: (80)				
Demariyon Houston; WR	Oklahoma City, OK	Millwood	6 ft 0 in (1.83 m)	165 lb (75 kg)	Feb 6, 2019
Demariyon Houston; WR	Recruit ratings: Rivals: 247Sports: ESPN: (80)				
Rahmir Johnson; RB	Oradell, NJ	Bergen Catholic	5 ft 10 in (1.78 m)	173 lb (78 kg)	Dec 19, 2018
Rahmir Johnson; RB	Recruit ratings: Rivals: 247Sports: ESPN: (80)				
Michael Lynn; OT	Englewood, CO	Cherry Creek	6 ft 6 in (1.98 m)	291 lb (132 kg)	Dec 19, 2018
Michael Lynn; OT	Recruit ratings: Rivals: 247Sports: ESPN: (77)				
Luke McCaffrey; ATH	Littleton, CO	Valor Christian	6 ft 2 in (1.88 m)	183 lb (83 kg)	Dec 19, 2018
Luke McCaffrey; ATH	Recruit ratings: Rivals: 247Sports: ESPN: (83)				
Jamie Nance; ATH	Blanchard, OK	Blanchard	6 ft 0 in (1.83 m)	160 lb (73 kg)	Dec 19, 2018
Jamie Nance; ATH	Recruit ratings: Rivals: 247Sports: ESPN: (77)				
Garret Nelson; DE	Scottsbluff, NE	Scottsbluff	6 ft 3 in (1.91 m)	235 lb (107 kg)	Dec 19, 2018
Garret Nelson; DE	Recruit ratings: Rivals: 247Sports: ESPN: (74)				
Mosai Newsom; DE	Waverly, IA	Waverly-Shell Rock	6 ft 3 in (1.91 m)	252 lb (114 kg)	Dec 19, 2018
Mosai Newsom; DE	Recruit ratings: Rivals: 247Sports: ESPN: (77)				
Quinton Newsome; S	Suwanee, GA	North Gwinnett	6 ft 2 in (1.88 m)	180 lb (82 kg)	Dec 19, 2018
Quinton Newsome; S	Recruit ratings: Rivals: 247Sports: ESPN: (80)				
Ethan Piper; DT	Norfolk, NE	Norfolk Catholic	6 ft 4 in (1.93 m)	275 lb (125 kg)	Dec 19, 2018
Ethan Piper; DT	Recruit ratings: Rivals: 247Sports: ESPN: (74)				
Noa Pola-Gates; S	Gilbert, AZ	Williams Field	5 ft 11 in (1.80 m)	180 lb (82 kg)	Jan 19, 2019
Noa Pola-Gates; S	Recruit ratings: Rivals: 247Sports: ESPN: (81)				
Ty Robinson; DE	Gilbert, AZ	Higley	6 ft 6 in (1.98 m)	285 lb (129 kg)	Dec 19, 2018
Ty Robinson; DE	Recruit ratings: Rivals: 247Sports: ESPN: (80)				
Wan'Dale Robinson; ATH	Frankfort, KY	Western Hills	5 ft 10 in (1.78 m)	180 lb (82 kg)	Dec 19, 2018
Wan'Dale Robinson; ATH	Recruit ratings: Rivals: 247Sports: ESPN: (80)				
Garrett Snodgrass; ATH	York, NE	York	6 ft 3 in (1.91 m)	217 lb (98 kg)	Dec 19, 2018
Garrett Snodgrass; ATH	Recruit ratings: Rivals: 247Sports: ESPN: (76)				
Ronald Thompkins; RB	Loganville, GA	Grayson	5 ft 11 in (1.80 m)	195 lb (88 kg)	Dec 19, 2018
Ronald Thompkins; RB	Recruit ratings: Scout: Rivals: 247Sports: ESPN: (80)				
Javin Wright; CB	Chandler, AZ	Hamilton	6 ft 3 in (1.91 m)	195 lb (88 kg)	Dec 19, 2018
Javin Wright; CB	Recruit ratings: Rivals: 247Sports: ESPN: (78)				
Overall recruit ranking: Rivals: 15 247Sports: 15 ESPN: 18
Note: In many cases, Scout, Rivals, 247Sports, On3, and ESPN may conflict in their listings of height and weight.; In these cases, the average was taken. ESPN grades are on a 100-point scale.; Sources: "Nebraska Football Commitments". Rivals.; "ESPN". ESPN.; "2019 Team Ranking". Rivals.com.

===== Walk-on recruits =====
College recruiting (2019)
Name	Hometown	School	Height	Weight	Commit date
John Bullock; DB	Omaha, NE	Creighton Prep	6 ft 1 in (1.85 m)	195 lb (88 kg)	Dec 26, 2018
John Bullock; DB	Recruit ratings: Rivals: 247Sports: ESPN:				
Grant Detlefsen; P	Lincoln, NE	Lincoln Southeast	6 ft 4 in (1.93 m)	215 lb (98 kg)	Sep 6, 2018
Grant Detlefsen; P	Recruit ratings: Rivals: 247Sports: ESPN:				
John Goodwin; ATH	Lincoln, NE	Lincoln High	6 ft 3 in (1.91 m)	230 lb (100 kg)	Feb 2, 2019
John Goodwin; ATH	Recruit ratings: Rivals: 247Sports: ESPN:				
Tyson Guzman; S	Omaha, NE	Westside	6 ft 4 in (1.93 m)	195 lb (88 kg)	Jan 5, 2019
Tyson Guzman; S	Recruit ratings: Rivals: 247Sports: ESPN:				
Gabe Heins; K	Kearney, NE	Kearney	6 ft 0 in (1.83 m)	165 lb (75 kg)	Dec 28, 2018
Gabe Heins; K	Recruit ratings: Rivals: 247Sports: ESPN:				
Jacob Herbek; TE	Grand Island, NE	Grand Island Central Catholic	6 ft 5 in (1.96 m)	210 lb (95 kg)	Jan 21, 2019
Jacob Herbek; TE	Recruit ratings: Rivals: 247Sports: ESPN:				
Matt Huser; DL	Omaha, NE	Millard West	6 ft 5 in (1.96 m)	260 lb (120 kg)	Dec 19, 2019
Matt Huser; DL	Recruit ratings: Rivals: 247Sports: ESPN:				
Garrett Hustedt; LB	Omaha, NE	Elkhorn Mt. Michael	6 ft 2 in (1.88 m)	220 lb (100 kg)	Jan 21, 2019
Garrett Hustedt; LB	Recruit ratings: Rivals: 247Sports: ESPN:				
Austin Jablonski; QB	Lincoln, NE	Pius X	6 ft 2 in (1.88 m)	200 lb (91 kg)	Dec 24, 2018
Austin Jablonski; QB	Recruit ratings: Rivals: 247Sports: ESPN:				
Cooper Jewett; RB	Omaha, NE	Elkhorn South	5 ft 10 in (1.78 m)	180 lb (82 kg)	Feb 6, 2019
Cooper Jewett; RB	Recruit ratings: Rivals: 247Sports: ESPN:				
Dylan Jorgensen; K	Lincoln, NE	Lincoln Southwest	5 ft 9 in (1.75 m)	170 lb (77 kg)	Dec 19, 2018
Dylan Jorgensen; K	Recruit ratings: Rivals: 247Sports: ESPN:				
Riley Kinney; WR	Loveland, CO	Loveland	6 ft 4 in (1.93 m)	190 lb (86 kg)	Jan 19, 2019
Riley Kinney; WR	Recruit ratings: Rivals: 247Sports: ESPN:				
Cam Kleinschmidt; DB	Lincoln, NE	Lincoln High	5 ft 10 in (1.78 m)	170 lb (77 kg)	Oct 5, 2018
Cam Kleinschmidt; DB	Recruit ratings: Rivals: 247Sports: ESPN:				
Nick Leader; LB	Lincoln, NE	Lincoln (NE) Southwest	6 ft 1 in (1.85 m)	200 lb (91 kg)	Dec 19, 2018
Nick Leader; LB	Recruit ratings: Rivals: 247Sports: ESPN:				
Caden McCormack; LB	Lincoln, NE	Lincoln Southwest	6 ft 2 in (1.88 m)	210 lb (95 kg)	Dec 6, 2018
Caden McCormack; LB	Recruit ratings: Rivals: 247Sports: ESPN:				
Brayden Miller; QB	Kearney, NE	Kearney	6 ft 1 in (1.85 m)	203 lb (92 kg)	Jan 22, 2019
Brayden Miller; QB	Recruit ratings: Rivals: 247Sports: ESPN:				
Riley Moses; C	Fairmont, NE	Fillmore Central	6 ft 2 in (1.88 m)	265 lb (120 kg)	Dec 19, 2018
Riley Moses; C	Recruit ratings: Rivals: 247Sports: ESPN:				
Garrett Nuss; OL	Sutton, NE	Sutton	6 ft 5 in (1.96 m)	240 lb (110 kg)	Feb 11, 2019
Garrett Nuss; OL	Recruit ratings: Rivals: 247Sports: ESPN:				
Luke Reimer; ATH	Lincoln, NE	Lincoln North Star	6 ft 1 in (1.85 m)	195 lb (88 kg)	Dec 19, 2018
Luke Reimer; ATH	Recruit ratings: Rivals: 247Sports: ESPN:				
Eli Richter; OL	Kearney, NE	Kearney Catholic	6 ft 4 in (1.93 m)	215 lb (98 kg)	Dec 19, 2018
Eli Richter; OL	Recruit ratings: Rivals: 247Sports: ESPN:				
Braden Sellon; LB	Lincoln, NE	Lincoln East	6 ft 0 in (1.83 m)	215 lb (98 kg)	Feb 6, 2019
Braden Sellon; LB	Recruit ratings: Rivals: 247Sports: ESPN:				
Sam Shurtleff; LB	Watkinsville, GA	Oconee County	6 ft 3 in (1.91 m)	215 lb (98 kg)	Dec 19, 2018
Sam Shurtleff; LB	Recruit ratings: Rivals: 247Sports: ESPN:				
Noah Stafursky; OL	York, NE	York	6 ft 3 in (1.91 m)	310 lb (140 kg)	Dec 19, 2018
Noah Stafursky; OL	Recruit ratings: Rivals: 247Sports: ESPN:				
Zach Weinmaster; WR	Loveland, CO	Loveland	5 ft 11 in (1.80 m)	185 lb (84 kg)	Nov 18, 2018
Zach Weinmaster; WR	Recruit ratings: Rivals: 247Sports: ESPN:				
Overall recruit ranking:
Note: In many cases, Scout, Rivals, 247Sports, On3, and ESPN may conflict in their listings of height and weight.; In these cases, the average was taken. ESPN grades are on a 100-point scale.; Sources: "2019 Team Ranking". Rivals.com.

=== Transfers ===
==== Outgoing ====
Name	Number	Position	Height	Weight	Class	Hometown	Destination
Greg Bell	#25	RB	6'0"	205	Junior	Chula Vista, CA	San Diego State
Cole Frahm	#39	K	6'5"	210	Sophomore	Omaha, NE	South Dakota State
Branden Hohenstein	#47	TE	6'4"	205	Junior	Jackson, NE	Abilene Christian
Tyjon Lindsey	#1	WR	5'9"	160	Sophomore	Las Vegas, NV	Oregon State
Justin McGriff	#13	WR	6'6"	210	RS-Freshman	Tampa, FL	ASA College
Guy Thomas	#18	LB	6'3"	230	Sophomore	Miami, FL	Colorado
Caleb Lightbourn	#35	P	6'3"	250	Senior	Washougal, WA	Oregon State
Breon Dixon	#34	OLB	5'11"	205	Junior	Suwanee, GA	Iowa Western CC
Cam'ron Jones	#29	DB	6'1"	180	RS-Freshman	Mansfield, TX	Southern Methodist
Quayshon Alexander	#30	OLB	6'3"	250	Junior	Wayne, NJ	Towson

==== Incoming ====
Name	Number	Position	Height	Weight	Class	Hometown	Previous School
Darrion Daniels	#79	DL	6'4"	340	Senior	Dallas, TX	Oklahoma State
Kanawai Noa	#9	WR	6'0"	200	Senior	Honolulu, HI	California
Dedrick Mills	#26	RB	5'11"	220	Junior	Waycross, GA	Garden City CC
Travis Vokolek	#83	TE	6'6"	250	Junior	Springfield, MO	Rutgers

=== Spring scrimmage ===
2019 Red—White Spring Game

Team	1	2	3	4	Total
White	3	3	7	0	13
• Red	7	17	0	0	24

- Date: April 13, 2019
- Location: Memorial Stadium, Lincoln, NE
- Game start: 1:00 p.m. CST
- Game attendance: 85,946
- Television network: BTN

== Preseason ==
=== Award watch lists ===
Listed in the order that they were released

Award	Player	Position	Year
Lott Trophy	Mohamed Barry	LB	SR
Maxwell Award	Adrian Martinez	QB	SO
Davey O'Brien Award	Adrian Martinez	QB	SO
Biletnikoff Award	JD Spielman	WR	JR
John Mackey Award	Jack Stoll	TE	JR
Butkus Award	Mohamed Barry	LB	SR
Dodd Trophy	Scott Frost	HC	
Wuerffel Trophy	Ben Stille	DL	JR
Walter Camp Award	Adrian Martinez	QB	SO
Polynesian College Football Player Of The Year Award	Kanawai Noa	WR	SR
Manning Award	Adrian Martinez	QB	SO

=== Preseason Big Ten poll ===
Although the Big Ten Conference has not held an official preseason poll since 2010, Cleveland.com has polled sports journalists representing all member schools as a de facto preseason media poll since 2011. In the 2019 poll, Nebraska was projected to win the West Division.

== Schedule ==
The 2019 schedule consisted of seven home and five away games in the regular season. Nebraska hosted conference foes Ohio State, Northwestern, Indiana, Wisconsin and Iowa and the Cornhuskers traveled to play Illinois, Minnesota, Purdue and Maryland in Big Ten play.

Date	Time	Opponent	Rank	Site	TV	Result	Attendance
August 31	11:00 am	South Alabama*	No. 24	Memorial Stadium; Lincoln, NE	ESPN	W 35–21	89,502
September 7	2:30 pm	at Colorado*	No. 25	Folsom Field; Boulder, CO (rivalry)	FOX	L 31–34 ^{OT}	52,829
September 14	7:00 pm	Northern Illinois*		Memorial Stadium; Lincoln, NE	FS1	W 44–8	89,593
September 21	7:00 pm	at Illinois		Memorial Stadium; Champaign, IL	BTN	W 42–38	44,512
September 28	6:30 pm	No. 5 Ohio State		Memorial Stadium; Lincoln, NE (College GameDay)	ABC	L 7–48	89,759
October 5	3:00 pm	Northwestern^{†}		Memorial Stadium; Lincoln, NE	FOX	W 13–10	89,348
October 12	6:30 pm	at Minnesota		TCF Bank Stadium; Minneapolis, MN (rivalry)	FS1	L 7–34	43,502
October 26	2:30 pm	Indiana		Memorial Stadium; Lincoln, NE	BTN	L 31–38	89,317
November 2	11:00 am	at Purdue		Ross-Ade Stadium; West Lafayette, IN	FOX	L 27–31	50,606
November 16	11:00 am	No. 14 Wisconsin		Memorial Stadium; Lincoln, NE (Freedom Trophy)	BTN	L 21–37	88,842
November 23	2:30 pm	at Maryland		Maryland Stadium; College Park, MD	BTN	W 54–7	34,082
November 29	1:30 pm	No. 17 Iowa		Memorial Stadium; Lincoln, NE (Heroes Game)	BTN	L 24–27	89,039
*Non-conference game; ^{†}Homecoming; Rankings from AP Poll and CFP Rankings (after November 5) released prior to game; All times are in Central time

== Roster and coaching staff ==
2019 Nebraska Cornhuskers football team roster
Players
Coaches
Offense

Pos.	#	Name	Class
TE	11	Austin Allen	So
OL	72	Matthew Anderson	Fr
OL	61	Mitchell Balenger	RFr
OL	73	Broc Bando	So
WR	36	Christian Banker	So
OL	74	Brant Banks	Fr
RB	38	Brody Belt	RFr
OL	54	Bryce Benhart	Fr
OL	59	Ian Boerkircher	RFr
RB	33	Jaylin Bradley	So
RB	35	Moses Bryant	RFr
QB	17	Andrew Bunch	Jr
WR	45	Ty Chaffin	Jr
WR	13	Darien Chase	Fr
OL	71	Matt Farniok (C)	Jr
OL	68	Will Farniok	RFr
WR	29	Bennett Folkers	RFr
OL	52	AJ Forbes	RFr
OL	78	Jimmy Fritzsche	Fr
OL	65	Christian Gaylord (injured)	Sr
TE	46	John Goodwin	Fr
RB	49	Austin Hemphill	Sr
TE	87	Chris Hickman	Fr
OL	75	Trent Hixson	So
WR	89	Todd Honas	Jr
WR	5	Demariyon Houston	Fr
WR	47	Austin Jablonski	Fr
OL	76	Brenden Jaimes	Jr
RB	24	Cooper Jewett	Fr
RB	14	Rahmir Johnson	Fr
WR	22	Miles Jones	RFr
OL	51	Cam Jurgens	RFr
TE	48	Bryson Krull	RFr
WR	85	Wyatt Liewer	RFr
OL	77	Michael Lynn	Fr
QB	2	Adrian Martinez (C)	So
QB	18	Matt Masker	RFr
RB	37	Wyatt Mazour	Sr
QB	7	Luke McCaffrey	Fr
WR	4	Jaevon McQuitty	So
QB	14	Brayden Miller	Fr
OL	66	Hunter Miller	So
RB	26	Dedrick Mills	Jr
OL	53	Riley Moses	Fr
WR	3	Jamie Nance	Fr
WR	9	Kanawai Noa	Sr
OL	67	Garrett Nuss	Fr
TE	40	Brian Perez	Jr
OL	57	Ethan Piper	Fr
TE	82	Kurt Rafdal	So
OL	50	John Raridon	Jr
WR/RB	1	Wan'Dale Robinson	Fr
RB	43	Connor Ruth	RFr
RB	46	Corbin Ruth	So
OL	70	Matt Sichterman	So
WR	10	JD Spielman	Jr
OL	79	Noah Starfursky	Fr
TE	86	Jack Stoll	Jr
RB	25	Ronald Thompkins	Fr
QB	16	Noah Vedral	So
OL	62	Nick Virka	Sr
TE	83	Travis Vokolek	Jr
WR	81	Kade Warner	So
RB	28	Maurice Washington	So
OL	58	Josh Wegener	Jr
RB	31	Zach Weinmaster	Fr
WR	19	Mike Williams	Sr
OL	56	Boe Wilson	Jr
WR	8	Jaron Woodyard	Sr

Defense

Pos.	#	Name	Class
OLB	45	David Alston	RFr
S	4	Avery Anderson	Sr
DL	75	Fyn Anderson	Sr
ILB	50	Jake Archer	RFr
ILB	51	Anthony Banderas	RFr
ILB	7	Mohamed Barry (C)	Sr
CB	23	Dicaprio Bootle	Jr
OLB	85	John Bullock	Fr
CB	39	Bradley Bunner	So
CB	25	Tony Butler	Jr
ILB	58	Chris Cassidy	RFr
CB	17	Braxton Clark	RFr
CB	16	Ethan Cox	So
DL	93	Damion Daniels	So
DL	79	Darrion Daniels (C)	Sr
OLB	22	Alex Davis	Sr
DL	96	Carlos Davis	Sr
DL	94	Khalil Davis	Sr
S	19	Marquel Dismuke	Jr
OLB	13	JoJo Domann	Jr
S	18	Myles Farmer	Fr
DL	82	Colton Feist	RFr
OLB	43	Tyrin Ferguson	Sr
OLB	89	Jamin Graham	Fr
S	47	Tyson Guzman	Fr
ILB	10	Jackson Hannah	Fr
ILB	42	Nick Henrich	Fr
DL	80	Jacob Herbek	Fr
ILB	3	Will Honas	Jr
DL	70	Matt Huser	Fr
ILB	39	Garrett Hustedt	Fr
DL	38	Damian Jackson	So
CB	21	Lamar Jackson	Sr
OLB	32	Pernell Jefferson	Jr
ILB	53	Joseph Johnson	RFr
S	36	Reid Karel	Sr
OLB	81	Nick Leader	Fr
S	6	Eric Lee Jr.	Sr
DL	90	Ben Lingenfelter	So
S	48	Lane McCallum	So
ILB	59	Caden McCormack	Fr
ILB	31	Collin Miller	Jr
DL	9	DaiShon Neal	Sr
OLB	44	Garrett Nelson	Fr
DL	52	Mosai Newsom	Fr
CB	12	Quinton Newsome	Fr
OLB	34	Simon Otte	RFr
OLB	55	Jordan Paup	So
S	26	Noa Pola-Gates	Fr
ILB	28	Luke Reimer	Fr
DL	84	Eli Richter	Fr
DL	99	Ty Robinson	Fr
DL	98	Casey Rogers	RFr
CB	37	Phalen Sanford	RFr
OLB	54	Ryan Schommer	RFr
OLB	83	Sam Shurtleff	Fr
ILB	41	Garrett Snodgrass	Fr
S	49	Isaiah Stalbird	RFr
DL	95	Ben Stille	Jr
CB	24	Jeramiah Stovall	Sr
S	30	Eli Sullivan	Jr
OLB	2	Caleb Tannor	So
DB	5	Cam Taylor-Britt	So
DL	97	Deontre Thomas	So
DL	11	Vaha Vainuku	Sr
DL	55	Chris Walker	So
DL	92	Tate Wildeman	RFr
S	8	Deontai Williams (injured)	Jr
DB	33	Javin Wright	Fr

Special teams

Pos.	#	Name	Class
P	98	Isaac Armstrong	Sr
P	95	Grant Detlefsen	Fr
PK	93	Gabe Heins	Fr
PK	97	Dylan Jorgensen	Fr
LS	94	Cade Mueller	RFr
PK	32	Barret Pickering	So
LS	91	Cameron Pieper	RFr
P	99	William Przystup	RFr
LS	92	Chase Urbach	Sr
P	90	Jackson Walker	Sr

Head coach

- Scott Frost
  4th season as HC
  2nd year at Nebraska
  Alma mater: Nebraska

Coordinators/assistant coaches

- Erik Chinander
  4th season as DC
  2nd year at Nebraska
  Alma mater: Iowa
- Troy Walters
  11th season as WR coach, 5th as OC
  2nd year at Nebraska
  Alma mater: Stanford
- Greg Austin
  7th season as OL coach
  2nd year at Nebraska
  Alma mater: Nebraska
- Sean Beckton
  4th season as TE coach
  2nd year at Nebraska
  Alma mater: Central Florida
- Jovan Dewitt
  11th season as OLB coach, 7th as ST coach
  2nd year at Nebraska
  Alma mater: Northern Michigan
- Travis Fisher
  8th season as DB coach
  2nd year at Nebraska
  Alma mater: Central Florida
- Ryan Held
  4th season as RB coach
  2nd year at Nebraska
  Alma mater: Nebraska
- Barrett Ruud
  2nd season as ILB coach
  2nd year at Nebraska
  Alma mater: Nebraska
- Tony Tuioti
  4th season as DL coach
  1st year at Nebraska
  Alma mater: Hawaii
- Mario Verduzco
  27th season as QB coach
  2nd year at Nebraska
  Alma mater: San Jose St.

Legend

- (C) Team captain
- (S) Suspended
- (I) Ineligible
- Injured
- Redshirt

Roster
Last update: August 8, 2019

=== Depth chart ===
Defense

FS
Marquel Dismuke
Eli Sullivan
Isaiah Stalbird

NICKEL	ILB	ILB	OLB
JoJo Domann	Mohamed Barry	Collin Miller	Alex Davis; Caleb Tannor
⋅	Luke Reimer	Will Honas	Garrett Nelson
⋅	⋅	⋅	⋅

SS
Cam Taylor-Britt
Eric Lee
⋅

CB
Lamar Jackson
Quinton Newsome
⋅

DE	NT	DE
Khalil Davis	Darrion Daniels	Carlos Davis
Deontre Thomas	Damian Daniels	Ben Stille
⋅	⋅	⋅

CB
Dicaprio Bootle
Braxton Clark
⋅

Offense

WR
Wan'Dale Robinson
Kade Warner
⋅

WR
Kanawai Noa
Mike Williams
⋅

LT	LG	C	RG	RT
Brenden Jaimes	Trent Hixson	Cam Jurgens	Boe Wilson	Matt Farniok
Broc Bando	John Raridon	Will Farniok	Matt Sichterman	Bryce Benhart
⋅	⋅	⋅	⋅	⋅

TE
Jack Stoll
Austin Allen
Kurt Rafdel

WR
JD Spielman
Jaron Woodyard
Jeavon Mcquitty
⋅

QB
Adrian Martinez
Noah Vedral
Luke McCaffrey

Key reserves
Season-ending injury Number of games played ()
S Deontai Williams (1)
OT Christian Gaylord (0)

RB
Dedrick Mills
Maurice Washington
Wyatt Mazour

Special teams
PK 5
P Issac Armstrong
KR Wan'Dale Robinson
PR JD Spielman
LS Chase Urbach

== Game summaries ==
=== South Alabama ===
South Alabama at No. 24 Nebraska

Team	1	2	3	4	Total
South Alabama	7	0	14	0	21
• No. 24 Nebraska	7	7	14	7	35

- Date: August 31
- Location: Memorial Stadium
  Lincoln, NE
- Game start: 11:00 a.m. CDT
- Elapsed time: 3:27
- Game attendance: 89,502
- Game weather: 65 degrees, Wind SE @ 10 mph
- Referee: Mike Cannon
- TV announcers (ESPN): Beth Mowins, Anthony Becht, Rocky Boiman

Scoring summary
1	12:19	Nebraska	Dedrick Mills 1 yard run (Dylan Jorgensen kick)	Nebraska 7–0
1	5:32	South Alabama	Cephus Johnson 3 yard run (Frankie Onate kick)	7–7
2	9:15	Nebraska	Dedrick Mills 1 yard run (Dylan Jorgensen kick)	Nebraska 14–7
3	13:11	Nebraska	Eric Lee Jr. 38 yard interception return (Dylan Jorgensen kick)	Nebraska 21–7
3	11:32	Nebraska	JD Spielman 76 yard punt return (Dylan Jorgensen kick)	Nebraska 28–7
3	6:47	South Alabama	Davyn Flenord 9 yard pass from Cephus Johnson (Frankie Onate kick)	Nebraska 28–14
3	2:17	South Alabama	Khameron Taylor 13 yard pass from Cephus Johnson (Frankie Onate kick)	Nebraska 28–21
4	14:53	Nebraska	Alex Davis 0 yard fumble recovery (Dylan Jorgensen kick)	Nebraska 35–21

South Alabama Game starters

Position	Player
Quarterback	Adrian Martinez
Running Back	Dedrick Mills
Wide Receiver	Wan'Dale Robinson
Wide Receiver	Mike Williams
Wide Receiver	JD Spielman
Tight End	Jack Stoll
Left Tackle	Brenden Jaimes
Left Guard	Trent Hixson
Center	Cam Jurgens
Right Guard	Boe Wilson
Right Tackle	Matt Farniok

Position	Player
Defensive End	Carlos Davis
Nose Tackle	Darrion Daniels
Defensive End	Khalil Davis
Outside Linebacker	Alex Davis
Inside Linebacker	Collin Miller
Inside Linebacker	Mohamed Barry
Outside Linebacker	Caleb Tannor
Nickelback	JoJo Domann
Cornerback	Dicaprio Bootle
Strong Safety	Deontai Williams
Free Safety	Marquel Dismuke
Cornerback	Lamar Jackson

=== At Colorado ===
No. 25 Nebraska at Colorado

Team	1	2	3	4	OT	Total
No. 25 Nebraska	7	10	0	14	0	31
• Colorado	0	0	7	24	3	34

- Date: September 7
- Location: Folsom Field
  Boulder, CO
- Game start: 2:30 p.m. CDT
- Elapsed time: 3:49
- Game attendance: 52,829
- Game weather: Partly Cloudy, 88 degrees, Wind W @ 10 mph/Gust 23 mph
- Referee: John O'Neill
- TV announcers (FOX): Joe Davis, Brock Huard, Bruce Feldman

Scoring summary
1	6:02	Nebraska	JD Spielman 65 yard pass from Adrian Martinez (Isaac Armstrong kick)	Nebraska 7–0
2	6:37	Nebraska	Adrian Martinez 5 yard run (Isaac Armstrong kick)	Nebraska 14–0
2	2:47	Nebraska	Isaac Armstrong 26 yard field goal	Nebraska 17–0
3	1:42	Colorado	Jaren Mangham 11 yard run (James Stefanou kick)	Nebraska 17–7
4	14:22	Colorado	K.D. Nixon 96 yard pass from Steven Montez (James Stefanou kick)	Nebraska 17–14
4	14:09	Nebraska	Maurice Washington 75 yard pass from Adrian Martinez (Isaac Armstrong kick)	Nebraska 24–14
4	12:19	Colorado	Jaren Mangham 7 yard run (James Stefanou kick)	Nebraska 24–21
4	8:30	Colorado	James Stefanou 20 yard field goal	24–24
4	5:49	Nebraska	Adrian Martinez 6 yard run (Isaac Armstrong kick)	Nebraska 31–24
4	0:46	Colorado	Tony Brown 26 yard pass from Steven Montez (James Stefanou kick)	31–31
OT	--	Colorado	James Stefanou 34 yard field goal	Colorado 34–31

Colorado Game starters

Position	Player
Quarterback	Adrian Martinez
Running Back	Maurice Washington
Wide Receiver	Wan'Dale Robinson
Wide Receiver	Kanawai Noa
Wide Receiver	JD Spielman
Tight End	Jack Stoll
Left Tackle	Brenden Jaimes
Left Guard	Trent Hixson
Center	Cam Jurgens
Right Guard	Boe Wilson
Right Tackle	Matt Farniok

Position	Player
Defensive End	Carlos Davis
Nose Tackle	Darrion Daniels
Defensive End	Khalil Davis
Outside Linebacker	Alex Davis
Inside Linebacker	Collin Miller
Inside Linebacker	Mohamed Barry
Cornerback	Cam Taylor-Britt
Cornerback	Dicaprio Bootle
Strong Safety	Eric Lee
Free Safety	Marquel Dismuke
Cornerback	Lamar Jackson

=== Northern Illinois ===
Northern Illinois at Nebraska

Team	1	2	3	4	Total
Northern Illinois	0	5	3	0	8
• Nebraska	10	20	7	7	44

- Date: September 14
- Location: Memorial Stadium
  Lincoln, NE
- Game start: 7:00 p.m. CDT
- Elapsed time: 3:21
- Game attendance: 89,593
- Game weather: Partly Cloudy, 84 degrees, Wind WSW @ 9 mph
- Referee: Mark Kluczynsky
- TV announcers (Fox Business Network/FS1): Justin Kutcher, Petros Papadakis, Shane Vereen

Scoring summary
1	12:31	Nebraska	Isaac Armstrong 36 yard field goal	Nebraska 3–0
1	6:22	Nebraska	Maurice Washington 21 yard pass from Adrian Martinez (Isaac Armstrong kick)	Nebraska 10–0
2	12:20	Nebraska	Maurice Washington 60 yard run (Isaac Armstrong kick blocked)	Nebraska 16–0
2	7:58	Northern Illinois	John Richardson 45 yard field goal	Nebraska 16–3
2	7:19	Nebraska	Dedrick Mills 24 yard run (Isaac Armstrong kick)	Nebraska 23–3
2	1:49	Northern Illinois	Jordan Cole 4 yard safety	Nebraska 23–5
2	0:05	Nebraska	Kanawai Noa 27 yard pass from Adrian Martinez (Lane McCallum kick)	Nebraska 30–5
3	9:47	Northern Illinois	John Richardson 27 yard field goal	Nebraska 30–8
3	3:00	Nebraska	Adrian Martinez 10 yard run (Lane McCallum kick)	Nebraska 37–8
4	4:04	Nebraska	Noah Vedral 3 yard run (Lane McCallum kick)	Nebraska 44–8

North Illinois Game starters

Position	Player
Quarterback	Adrian Martinez
Running Back	Maurice Washington
Wide Receiver	Wan'Dale Robinson
Wide Receiver	Kanawai Noa
Wide Receiver	JD Spielman
Tight End	Jack Stoll
Left Tackle	Brenden Jaimes
Left Guard	Trent Hixson
Center	Cam Jurgens
Right Guard	Boe Wilson
Right Tackle	Matt Farniok

Position	Player
Defensive End	Carlos Davis
Nose Tackle	Darrion Daniels
Defensive End	Khalil Davis
Outside Linebacker	Alex Davis
Inside Linebacker	Collin Miller
Inside Linebacker	Mohamed Barry
Outside Linebacker	Caleb Tannor
Nickelback	JoJo Domann
Cornerback	Dicaprio Bootle
Strong Safety	Cam Taylor-Britt
Free Safety	Marquel Dismuke
Cornerback	Lamar Jackson

=== At Illinois ===
Nebraska at Illinois

Team	1	2	3	4	Total
• Nebraska	7	7	13	15	42
Illinois	14	7	14	3	38

- Date: September 21
- Location: Memorial Stadium
  Champaign, IL
- Game start: 7:00 p.m. CDT
- Elapsed time: 3:40
- Game attendance: 44,512
- Game weather: Overcast, 80 degrees, Wind S @ 10–15 mph
- Referee: Michael Cannon
- TV announcers (BTN): Kevin Kugler, Matt Millen, Rick Pizzo

Scoring summary
1	14:12	Illinois	Reggie Corbin 66 yard run (James McCourt kick)	Illinois 7–0
1	8:12	Illinois	Josh Imatorbhebhe 26 yard pass from Brandon Peters (James McCourt kick)	Illinois 14–0
1	5:07	Nebraska	Jack Stoll 6 yard pass from Adrian Martinez (Lane McCallum kick)	Illinois 14–7
2	13:46	Illinois	RaVon Bonner 2 yard run (James McCourt kick)	Illinois 21–7
2	8:20	Nebraska	Wan'Dale Robinson 27 yard pass from Adrian Martinez (Lane McCallum kick)	Illinois 21–14
3	11:16	Illinois	Dre Brown 36 yard run (James McCourt kick)	Illinois 28–14
3	9:41	Nebraska	Wan'Dale Robinson 3 yard pass from Adrian Martinez (Lane McCallum kick)	Illinois 28–21
3	5:40	Illinois	Brandon Peters 10 yard run (James McCourt kick)	Illinois 35–21
3	2:11	Nebraska	Dedrick Mills 14 yard run (Lane McCallum kick blocked)	Illinois 35–27
4	14:29	Nebraska	Dedrick Mills 2 yard run (Adrian Martinez rush PAT)	35–35
4	12:08	Illinois	James McCourt 47 yard field goal	Illinois 38–35
4	8:00	Nebraska	Wan'Dale Robinson 1 yard run (Lane McCallum kick)	Nebraska 42–38

Nebraska trailed for most of the game, then came back to beat Illinois 42–38. With the victory, the Huskers got their first road win under Scott Frost and their 900th overall win in program history.

Illinois Game starters

Position	Player
Quarterback	Adrian Martinez
Running Back	Maurice Washingtion
Wide Receiver	Wan'Dale Robinson
Wide Receiver	Kanawai Noa
Wide Receiver	JD Spielman
Tight End	Jack Stoll
Left Tackle	Brenden Jaimes
Left Guard	Trent Hixson
Center	Cam Jurgens
Right Guard	Boe Wilson
Right Tackle	Matt Farniok

Position	Player
Defensive End	Carlos Davis
Nose Tackle	Darrion Daniels
Defensive End	Khalil Davis
Outside Linebacker	Alex Davis
Inside Linebacker	Collin Miller
Inside Linebacker	Mohamed Barry
Outside Linebacker	Caleb Tannor
Nickelback	JoJo Domann
Cornerback	Dicaprio Bootle
Strong Safety	Cam Taylor-Britt
Free Safety	Marquel Dismuke
Cornerback	Lamar Jackson

=== Ohio State ===
No. 5 Ohio State at Nebraska

Team	1	2	3	4	Total
• No. 5 Ohio State	14	24	10	0	48
Nebraska	0	0	7	0	7

- Date: September 28
- Location: Memorial Stadium
  Lincoln, NE
- Game start: 6:44 p.m. CDT
- Elapsed time: 2:54
- Game attendance: 89,759
- Game weather: Overcast, 64 degrees, Wind E @ 9 mph
- Referee: Jeff Servinski
- TV announcers (ABC): Chris Fowler, Kirk Herbstreit, Maria Taylor

Scoring summary
1	10:35	Ohio State	Justin Fields 15 yard run (Blake Haubeil kick)	Ohio State 7–0
1	4:37	Ohio State	K. J. Hill 2 yard pass from Justin Fields (Blake Haubeil kick)	Ohio State 14–0
2	9:32	Ohio State	Blake Haubeil 23 yard field goal	Ohio State 17–0
2	8:26	Ohio State	Master Teague 8 yard run (Blake Haubeil kick)	Ohio State 24–0
2	5:42	Ohio State	Master Teague 1 yard run (Blake Haubeil kick)	Ohio State 31–0
2	1:34	Ohio State	Austin Mack 18 yard pass from Justin Fields (Blake Haubeil kick)	Ohio State 38–0
3	10:35	Ohio State	Blake Haubeil 36 yard field goal	Ohio State 41–0
3	3:51	Ohio State	Garrett Wilson 6 yard pass from Justin Fields (Blake Haubeil kick)	Ohio State 48–0
3	2:07	Nebraska	Dedrick Mills 9 yard run (Lane McCallum kick)	Ohio State 48–7

Ohio State Game starters

Position	Player
Quarterback	Adrian Martinez
Running Back	Dedrick Mills
Wide Receiver	Wan'Dale Robinson
Wide Receiver	Kanawai Noa
Wide Receiver	JD Spielman
Tight End	Jack Stoll
Left Tackle	Brenden Jaimes
Left Guard	Trent Hixson
Center	Cam Jurgens
Right Guard	Boe Wilson
Right Tackle	Matt Farniok

Position	Player
Defensive End	Carlos Davis
Nose Tackle	Darrion Daniels
Defensive End	Khalil Davis
Outside Linebacker	Alex Davis
Inside Linebacker	Collin Miller
Inside Linebacker	Mohamed Barry
Nickelback	JoJo Domann
Cornerback	Dicaprio Bootle
Strong Safety	Cam Taylor-Britt
Free Safety	Marquel Dismuke
Cornerback	Lamar Jackson

=== Northwestern ===
Northwestern at Nebraska

Team	1	2	3	4	Total
Northwestern	0	3	7	0	10
• Nebraska	7	3	0	3	13

- Date: October 5
- Location: Memorial Stadium
  Lincoln, NE
- Game start: 3:06 p.m. CDT
- Elapsed time: 3:12
- Game attendance: 89,384
- Game weather: Sunny, 68 degrees, Wind West @ 12 mph
- Referee: John O'Neill
- TV announcers (FOX): Tim Brando, Spencer Tillman, Coley Harvey

Scoring summary
1	4:25	Nebraska	Wan'Dale Robinson 42 yard run (Lane McCallum kick)	Nebraska 7–0
2	8:24	Nebraska	Lane McCallum 35 yard field goal	Nebraska 10–0
2	5:15	Northwestern	Charlie Kuhbander 40 yard field goal	Nebraska 10–3
3	11:20	Northwestern	Aidan Smith 2 yard run (Charlie Kuhbander kick)	10–10
4	0:00	Nebraska	Lane McCallum 24 yard field goal	Nebraska 13–10

Northwestern Game starters

Position	Player
Quarterback	Adrian Martinez
Running Back	Dedrick Mills
Wide Receiver	Wan'Dale Robinson
Wide Receiver	Kanawai Noa
Wide Receiver	JD Spielman
Tight End	Jack Stoll
Left Tackle	Brenden Jaimes
Left Guard	Trent Hixson
Center	Cam Jurgens
Right Guard	Boe Wilson
Right Tackle	Matt Farniok

Position	Player
Defensive End	Carlos Davis
Nose Tackle	Darrion Daniels
Defensive End	Ben Stille
Outside Linebacker	Alex Davis
Inside Linebacker	Collin Miller
Inside Linebacker	Mohamed Barry
Nickelback	JoJo Domann
Cornerback	Dicaprio Bootle
Strong Safety	Cam Taylor-Britt
Free Safety	Marquel Dismuke
Cornerback	Lamar Jackson

=== At Minnesota ===
Nebraska at Minnesota

Team	1	2	3	4	Total
Nebraska	0	0	0	7	7
• Minnesota	7	7	20	0	34

- Date: October 12
- Location: TCF Bank Stadium
  Minneapolis, MN
- Game start: 6:40 p.m. CDT
- Elapsed time: 3:04
- Game attendance: 43,502
- Game weather: Wintry Mix, 37 degrees, Wind W @ 17 mph
- Referee: Larry Smith
- TV announcers (FS1): Brian Custer, Robert Smith

Scoring summary
1	7:31	Minnesota	Chris Autman-Bell 15 yard pass from Tanner Morgan (Michael Lantz kick)	Minnesota 7–0
2	10:15	Minnesota	Mohamed Ibrahim 15 yard run (Michael Lantz kick)	Minnesota 14–0
3	12:41	Minnesota	Mohamed Ibrahim 5 yard run (Michael Lantz kick)	Minnesota 21–0
3	3:16	Minnesota	Rodney Smith 1 yard run (Michael Lantz kick)	Minnesota 28–0
3	1:41	Minnesota	Mohamed Ibrahim 1 yard run (Michael Lantz kick failed)	Minnesota 34–0
4	12:32	Nebraska	Dedrick Mills 2 yard run (Lane McCallum kick)	Minnesota 34–7

Minnesota Game starters

Position	Player
Quarterback	Noah Vedral
Running Back	Maurice Washington
Wide Receiver	Wan'Dale Robinson
Wide Receiver	Kanawai Noa
Wide Receiver	JD Spielman
Tight End	Jack Stoll
Left Tackle	Brenden Jaimes
Left Guard	Trent Hixson
Center	Cam Jurgens
Right Guard	Boe Wilson
Right Tackle	Matt Farniok

Position	Player
Defensive End	Carlos Davis
Nose Tackle	Darrion Daniels
Defensive End	Khalil Davis
Outside Linebacker	Alex Davis
Inside Linebacker	Collin Miller
Inside Linebacker	Mohamed Barry
Outside Linebacker	Caleb Tannor
Nickelback	JoJo Domann
Cornerback	Dicaprio Bootle
Strong Safety	Cam Taylor-Britt
Free Safety	Marquel Dismuke
Cornerback	Lamar Jackson

=== Indiana ===
Indiana at Nebraska

Team	1	2	3	4	Total
• Indiana	9	7	15	7	38
Nebraska	14	7	3	7	31

- Date: October 26
- Location: Memorial Stadium
  Lincoln, NE
- Game start: 2:40 p.m. CDT
- Elapsed time: 3:29
- Game attendance: 89,317
- Game weather: Sunny, 59 degrees, Wind S @ 12 mph
- Referee: Ron Snodgrass
- TV announcers (BTN): Brandon Gaudin, James Laurinaitis, Rick Pizzo

Scoring summary
1	13:32	Nebraska	Noah Vedral 4 yard run (Barret Pickering kick)	Nebraska 7–0
1	8:45	Indiana	Logan Justus 22 yard field goal	Nebraska 7–3
1	6:57	Nebraska	Noah Vedral 1 yard run (Barret Pickering kick)	Nebraska 14–3
1	3:23	Indiana	Peyton Ramsey 8 yard run (Logan Justus kick failed)	Nebraska 14–9
2	12:19	Indiana	Ty Fryfogle 8 yard pass from Peyton Ramsey (Logan Justus kick)	Indiana 16–14
2	0:39	Nebraska	Kanawai Noa 24 yard pass from Luke McCaffrey (Barret Pickering kick)	Nebraska 21–16
3	7:30	Indiana	David Ellis 1 yard run (Peyton Hendershot pass from Peyton Ramsey)	Indiana 24–21
3	2:53	Nebraska	Barret Pickering 30 yard field goal	24–24
3	0:00	Indiana	Matt Bjorson 2 yard pass from Peyton Ramsey (Logan Justus kick)	Indiana 31–24
4	12:08	Indiana	Stevie Scott 9 yard run (Logan Justus kick)	Indiana 38–24
4	10:21	Nebraska	Wan'Dale Robinson 4 yard run (Barret Pickering kick)	Indiana 38–31

Indiana Game starters

Position	Player
Quarterback	Noah Vedral/Adrian Martinez
Running Back	Dedrick Mills
Wide Receiver	Wan'Dale Robinson
Wide Receiver	Kanawai Noa
Wide Receiver	JD Spielman
Tight End	Jack Stoll
Left Tackle	Brenden Jaimes
Left Guard	Trent Hixson
Center	Cam Jurgens
Right Guard	Boe Wilson
Right Tackle	Matt Farniok

Position	Player
Defensive End	Carlos Davis
Nose Tackle	Darrion Daniels
Defensive End	Khalil Davis
Outside Linebacker	Alex Davis
Inside Linebacker	Collin Miller
Inside Linebacker	Mohamed Barry
Nickelback	JoJo Domann
Cornerback	Dicaprio Bootle
Strong Safety	Cam Taylor-Britt
Free Safety	Marquel Dismuke
Cornerback	Lamar Jackson

=== At Purdue ===
Nebraska at Purdue

Team	1	2	3	4	Total
Nebraska	10	0	3	14	27
• Purdue	0	14	3	14	31

- Date: November 2
- Location: Ross-Ade Stadium
  West Lafayette, IN
- Game start: 11:05 a.m. CDT
- Elapsed time: 3:20
- Game attendance: 50,606
- Game weather: Cloudy, 41 degrees, Wind West @ 15 mph
- Referee: Dan Capron
- TV announcers (FOX): Tim Brando, Spencer Tillman, Coley Harvey

Scoring summary
1	8:32	Nebraska	Dedrick Mills 1-yard run (Barret Pickering kick)	Nebraska 7–0
1	2:05	Nebraska	Barret Pickering 23-yard field goal	Nebraska 10–0
2	7:04	Purdue	King Doerue 3-yard pass from Jack Plummer (J. D. Dellinger kick)	Nebraska 10–7
2	:14	Purdue	Payne Durham 16-yard pass from Jack Plummer (J. D. Dellinger kick)	Purdue 14–10
3	9:21	Nebraska	Barret Pickering 21-yard field goal	Purdue 14–13
3	1:14	Purdue	J. D. Dellinger 44-yard field goal	Purdue 17–13
4	12:30	Nebraska	Adrian Martinez 2-yard run (Barret Pickering kick)	Nebraska 20–17
4	6:50	Purdue	King Doerue 7-yard run (J. D. Dellinger kick)	Purdue 24–20
4	4:21	Nebraska	Adrian Martinez 4-yard run (Barret Pickering kick)	Nebraska 27–24
4	1:08	Purdue	David Bell 4-yard run (J. D. Dellinger kick)	Purdue 31–27

Purdue Game starters

Position	Player
Quarterback	Adrian Martinez
Running Back	Dedrick Mills
Wide Receiver	Kade Warner
Wide Receiver	Kanawai Noa
Wide Receiver	JD Spielman
Tight End	Jack Stoll
Left Tackle	Brenden Jaimes
Left Guard	Trent Hixson
Center	Cam Jurgens
Right Guard	Boe Wilson
Right Tackle	Matt Farniok

Position	Player
Defensive End	Carlos Davis
Nose Tackle	Darrion Daniels
Defensive End	Khalil Davis
Outside Linebacker	Alex Davis
Inside Linebacker	Collin Miller
Inside Linebacker	Mohamed Barry
Nickelback	JoJo Domann
Cornerback	Braxton Clark
Strong Safety	Dicaprio Bootle
Free Safety	Marquel Dismuke
Cornerback	Lamar Jackson

=== Wisconsin ===
No. 14 Wisconsin at Nebraska

Team	1	2	3	4	Total
• No. 14 Wisconsin	7	20	7	3	37
Nebraska	7	7	7	0	21

- Date: November 16
- Location: Memorial Stadium
  Lincoln, NE
- Game start: 11:01 a.m. CDT
- Elapsed time: 3:01
- Game attendance: 88,842
- Game weather: Sunny, 52 degrees, Wind S @ 14 mph
- Referee: Larry Smith
- TV announcers (BTN): Kevin Kugler, Matt Millen, Rick Pizzo

Scoring summary
1	5:27	Nebraska	Dedrick Mills 12 yard run (Barret Pickering kick)	Nebraska 7–0
1	5:16	Wisconsin	Aron Cruickshank 89 yard kickoff return (Collin Larsh kick)	7–7
2	11:22	Wisconsin	Collin Larsh 31 yard field goal	Wisconsin 10–7
2	9:32	Nebraska	Adrian Martinez 2 yard run (Barret Pickering kick)	Nebraska 14–10
2	6:39	Wisconsin	A.J. Taylor 55 yard pass from Jack Coan (Collin Larsh kick)	Wisconsin 17–14
2	5:03	Wisconsin	Jonathan Taylor 1 yard run (Collin Larsh kick)	Wisconsin 24–14
2	0:11	Wisconsin	Collin Larsh 24 yard field goal	Wisconsin 27–14
3	4:50	Wisconsin	Jonathan Taylor 11 yard run (Collin Larsh kick)	Wisconsin 34–14
3	3:19	Nebraska	JD Spielman 23 yard pass from Adrian Martinez (Barret Pickering kick)	Wisconsin 34–21
4	5:25	Wisconsin	Collin Larsh 30 yard field goal	Wisconsin 37–21

Wisconsin Game starters

Position	Player
Quarterback	Adrian Martinez
Running Back	Dedrick Mills
Wide Receiver	Kade Warner
Wide Receiver	Kanawai Noa
Wide Receiver	JD Spielman
Tight End	Jack Stoll
Left Tackle	Brenden Jaimes
Left Guard	Trent Hixson
Center	Cam Jurgens
Right Guard	Boe Wilson
Right Tackle	Matt Farniok

Position	Player
Defensive End	Ben Stille
Nose Tackle	Darrion Daniels
Defensive End	Khalil Davis
Outside Linebacker	Alex Davis
Inside Linebacker	Collin Miller
Inside Linebacker	Mohamed Barry
Nickelback	JoJo Domann
Cornerback	Cam Taylor-Britt
Strong Safety	Dicaprio Bootle
Free Safety	Marquel Dismuke
Cornerback	Lamar Jackson

=== At Maryland ===
Nebraska at Maryland

Team	1	2	3	4	Total
• Nebraska	17	17	10	10	54
Maryland	0	0	0	7	7

- Date: November 23
- Location: Maryland Stadium
  College Park, MD
- Game start: 2:37 p.m. CDT
- Elapsed time: 3:12
- Game attendance: 34,082
- Game weather: N/A
- Referee: John O'Neill
- Television network: BTN

Scoring summary
1	11:50	Nebraska	Dedrick Mills 6 yard run (Matt Waldoch kick)	Nebraska 7–0
1	5:39	Nebraska	Adrian Martinez 1 run (Matt Waldoch kick)	Nebraska 14–0
1	3:28	Nebraska	Matt Waldoch 29 yard field goal	Nebraska 17–0
2	14:10	Nebraska	JD Spielman 25 yard pass from Adrian Martinez (Matt Waldoch kick)	Nebraska 24–0
2	3:54	Nebraska	JD Spielman 16 yard pass from Adrian Martinez (Matt Waldoch kick)	Nebraska 31–0
2	0:00	Nebraska	Matt Waldoch 29 yard field goal	Nebraska 34–0
3	10:14	Nebraska	Matt Waldoch 29 yard field goal	Nebraska 37–0
3	2:21	Nebraska	Rahmir Johnson 1 yard run (Matt Waldoch kick)	Nebraska 44–0
4	12:10	Nebraska	Harrison Martin 18 yard field goal	Nebraska 47–0
4	5:10	Nebraska	Luke McCaffrey 3 yard run (Matt Waldoch kick)	Nebraska 54–0
4	3:13	Maryland	Javon Leake 58 yard run (Joseph Petrino kick)	Nebraska 54–7

Maryland Game starters

Position	Player
Quarterback	Adrian Martinez
Running Back	Dedrick Mills
Wide Receiver	Mike Williams
Wide Receiver	Kade Warner
Wide Receiver	JD Spielman
Tight End	Jack Stoll
Left Tackle	Brenden Jaimes
Left Guard	Trent Hixson
Center	Cam Jurgens
Right Guard	Boe Wilson
Right Tackle	Matt Farniok

Position	Player
Defensive End	Carlos Davis
Nose Tackle	Darrion Daniels
Defensive End	Khalil Davis
Outside Linebacker	Alex Davis
Inside Linebacker	Collin Miller
Inside Linebacker	Mohamed Barry
Nickelback	JoJo Domann
Cornerback	Cam Taylor-Britt
Strong Safety	Dicaprio Bootle
Free Safety	Marquel Dismuke
Cornerback	Lamar Jackson

=== Iowa ===
No. 17 Iowa at Nebraska

Team	1	2	3	4	Total
• #17 Iowa	14	10	0	3	27
Nebraska	3	7	14	0	24

- Date: November 29
- Location: Memorial Stadium
  Lincoln, NE
- Game start: 1:31 p.m. CDT
- Elapsed time: 3:21
- Game attendance: 89,039
- Game weather: Overcast/Light Rain, 35 degrees, Wind SE @ 8 mph
- Referee: Mike Cannon
- TV announcers (BTN): Kevin Kugler (play-by-play), Matt Millen (analyst), Lisa Byington (sideline)

Scoring summary
1	11:04	Iowa	Ihmir Smith-Marsette 45 yard run (Keith Duncan kick)	Iowa 7–0
1	4:03	Nebraska	Matt Waldoch 41 yard field goal	Iowa 7–3
1	3:08	Iowa	Tyler Goodson 55 yard run (Keith Duncan kick)	Iowa 14–3
2	11:37	Iowa	Keith Duncan 49 yard field goal	Iowa 17–3
2	8:54	Nebraska	Cam Taylor-Britt 38 yard interception (Matt Waldoch kick)	Iowa 17–10
2	8:41	Iowa	Ihmir Smith-Marsette 95 yard kickoff return (Keith Duncan kick)	Iowa 24–10
3	8:24	Nebraska	JD Spielman 39 yard pass from Luke McCaffrey (Matt Waldoch kick)	Iowa 24–17
3	0:32	Nebraska	Wyatt Mazour 9 yard run (Matt Waldoch kick)	24–24
4	0:01	Iowa	Keith Duncan 48 yard field goal	Iowa 27–24

Iowa Game starters

Position	Player
Quarterback	Adrian Martinez
Running Back	Dedrick Mills
Wide Receiver	Wan'Dale Robinson
Wide Receiver	Kade Warner
Wide Receiver	JD Spielman
Tight End	Jack Stoll
Left Tackle	Brenden Jaimes
Left Guard	Trent Hixson
Center	Cam Jurgens
Right Guard	Boe Wilson
Right Tackle	Matt Farniok

Position	Player
Defensive End	Carlos Davis
Nose Tackle	Darrion Daniels
Defensive End	Khalil Davis
Outside Linebacker	Alex Davis
Inside Linebacker	Collin Miller
Inside Linebacker	Mohamed Barry
Outside Linebacker	Caleb Tannor
Nickelback	JoJo Domann
Cornerback	Cam Taylor-Britt
Strong Safety	Dicaprio Bootle
Free Safety	Marquel Dismuke
Cornerback	Lamar Jackson

== Big Ten awards ==
=== Player of the Week Honors ===
Weekly Awards
Player	Award	Week Awarded	Ref.
Wan'Dale Robinson	Big Ten Freshman of the Week	Week 4	
Wan'Dale Robinson	Big Ten Freshman of the Week	Week 6	

=== All-Conference awards ===
2019 Big Ten All-Conference Teams and Awards

Media All-Big Ten
Position	Player	Team
DB	Lamar Jackson	Second Team
LB	Mohammed Barry	Honorable Mention
DB	Dicaprio Bootle	Honorable Mention
DL	Khalil Davis	Honorable Mention
OT	Brenden Jaimes	Honorable Mention
RB	Dedrick Mills	Honorable Mention
WR	Wan'Dale Robinson	Honorable Mention
WR	JD Spielman	Honorable Mention
DB	Cam Taylor-Britt	Honorable Mention

Coaches All-Big Ten
Position	Player	Team
DB	Lamar Jackson	Second Team
DL	Khalil Davis	Third Team
DL	Darrion Daniels	Honorable Mention
OT	Brenden Jaimes	Honorable Mention
RB	Dedrick Mills	Honorable Mention
WR	JD Spielman	Honorable Mention

== Rankings ==
Ranking movements Legend: ██ Increase in ranking ██ Decrease in ranking — = Not ranked RV = Received votes т = Tied with team above or below
	Week																
Poll	Pre	1	2	3	4	5	6	7	8	9	10	11	12	13	14	15	Final
AP	24	25-T	—	—	—	—	—	—	—	—	—	—	—	—	—	—	
Coaches	RV	25	RV	RV	RV	—	—	—	—	—	—	—	—	—	—	—	
CFP	Not released										—	—	—	—	—	—	Not released

== Players drafted into the NFL ==
Round	Pick	Player	Position	NFL Club
6	194	Khalil Davis	DT	Tampa Bay Buccaneers
7	232	Carlos Davis	DT	Pittsburgh Steelers
