= Blue Springs R-IV School District =

School district in Missouri, U.S.

Address
- 1801 NW Vesper St. Blue Springs, Missouri Kansas City Metropolitan Area Jackson County, Missouri, 64015; United States

District information
- Type: Public
- Motto: Education with Distinction
- Grades: PreK–12
- Established: 1949
- Superintendent: Dr. Bob Jerome
- School board: Jeff Siems, Kurt Swanson, Rhonda Gilstrap, Kay Coen, April Agate, Rebeca Swank
- Accreditation: Missouri Department of Elementary and Secondary Education
- Schools: 22
- Budget: $143,226,000 (2010–11)
- NCES District ID: 2905310

Students and staff
- Students: 14,500+
- Teachers: 1027
- Staff: 1,486
- Student–teacher ratio: 1:15

Other information
- Website: www.bssd.net

The Blue Springs R-IV School District is a school district that serves most of Blue Springs, Missouri in the Kansas City metropolitan area. The district has an enrollment of over 14,500 students. The mission of the Blue Springs School District, the champion for personal growth, is to ensure every student develops the skills and dispositions to thrive in a global community as a productive and collaborative citizen through innovative education distinguished by: rigorous, accessible learning experiences; diverse opportunities for involvement and leadership; and community partnerships that engage and support students and their families.

The Department of Elementary and Secondary Education reported that Blue Springs School District once again received a perfect score on the Annual Performance Report in 2011. This is the eleventh year in a row that the district has received a perfect score. This is determined by a number of factors including student achievement. The Blue Springs School District is one of only seven school districts in this state to have eleven consecutive years of distinction.

The district also serves a small southwestern portion of Independence, small northern portion of Lee's Summit, all of Lake Tapawingo and parts of unincorporated Jackson County, Missouri.

== History ==
The community of Blue Springs was founded in 1838 near today's Burris Old Mill Park on Woods Chapel Road and Walnut Street. The town quickly discovered a need for a schoolhouse. The Blue Springs Community built its first log-frame schoolhouse at the Y of Woods Chapel Road and Cemetery Rd, now Walnut Rd. On June 23, 1884, a new wood-frame one-room school was built on Woods Chapel Rd. to replace the first log frame schoolhouse. The first school district serving what later became known as "old Blue Springs" was the Old Blue Springs School District No. 50.

In 1879 the railroad built a train depot one mile east of the original community of Blue Springs next to the new railroad tracks. The town moved to its present location to take advantage of the commerce the train depot would provide. The city of Blue Springs was incorporated as a city in 1880 at its present downtown location. Blue Springs continued to grow as the "old Blue Springs" declined as businesses and families moved to the new Blue Springs. The new Blue Springs Public School District was organized in 1880. The first school in new Blue Springs was located in one room building on a site between where Rumbaugh Blacksmith Shop and the woodworking shops located on Main St. By this time, the old one-room schoolhouse on Woods Chapel Road in "old Blue Springs" was still being used but was now considered a rural or separate school district rather than part of the Blue Springs Public School District.

In 1885 a four-room frame building was erected near 16th Street, and Vesper Street. The first high school courses were organized in 1897 under S. M. Barrett, superintendent, and offered a 2-year course. In 1905 the Blue Springs Public School District built its first two-story brick schoolhouse for the growing community. This school was built at 16th and Summit Streets and offered a three year high school course. In 1921 a 4 year high school course was offered under Miss Ola V. Galatatas, superintendent.

In 1923 a larger new two-story brick schoolhouse was built. This brick school house was built adjacent to the old 1905 brick school house. The 1905 brick schoolhouse was then razed. The new school was simply called the Blue Springs School. All students of the Blue Springs School District attended first through twelfth grades at this school until 1951. The last graduating class from this school was the class of 1955. The school remained in use by the district and was later renamed Hansel Lowe School. It was eventually no longer used by the district and was sold to Timothy Lutheran Church in the late 1990s. Timothy Lutheran Church used it as a private school until they also built a new school. Today the school building is still standing but used as a private residence.

A practice of consolidating smaller school districts to eliminate one room school houses to better serve students was being completed across the state of Missouri. This happened in Blue Springs in 1949. That year an election was held and 10 one room school houses or smaller school districts joined Blue Springs Public School District to become the Reorganized Blue Springs R-IV School District. The schools consolidated were as follows: Pleasant Grove, Eureka, Sunny Vale, Williams, Fairview, Old Blue Springs, Sunny Side, Delta, Baird and Moreland.

All of the one room school houses were closed after the 1950–1951 school year. Those students then attended school in Blue Springs. In 1951 the Blue Springs Elementary School opened its doors. Which is today known as Thomas Ultican Elementary School. This was the first designed elementary only building in district history.

The population growth of the district continued to increase and so did the need for space for new students. In 1955 the first Blue Springs High School only building was built on Vesper Street. The first graduating class of the new high school was the class of 1956.

Franklin Smith Elementary School named for the founder of Blue Springs, opened its doors in 1967, as the second Elementary School in the district.

The current Blue Springs High School on Ashton Dr. opened its doors to students in 1971. In 1971 the original Blue Springs High School on Vesper became the Junior High School. It eventually became the Blue Springs Freshman Center. This building was raised in 2024 to make room for the Blue Springs School District's new Career Innovation Center, "C.I.C."

Since that time the district has continued to have rapid growth and has grown to have 13 elementary schools, 4 middle schools, 2 high schools, 1 alternative education center (containing middle, high, GED programs), an early childhood/special education center, and a career innovation center.

== Schools ==
Elementary

- Chapel Lakes Elementary School
- Cordill-Mason Elementary School
- Daniel Young Elementary School
- Franklin Smith Elementary School
- James Lewis Elementary School
- James Walker Elementary School
- John Nowlin Elementary School
- Lucy Franklin Elementary School
- Sunny Pointe Elementary School
- Thomas Ultican Elementary School
- Voy Spears Jr. Elementary School
- William Bryant Elementary School
- William Yates Elementary School

Middle Schools

- Applied Innovative Middle School (alternative)
- Brittany Hill Middle School
- Delta Woods Middle School
- Moreland Ridge Middle School
- Paul Kinder Middle School (formerly Sunny Vale)

High Schools

- Blue Springs High School
- Blue Springs South High School
- Valley View High School (alternative)

The Blue Springs School District also offers the Liggett Trail Education Center which is a setting designed to address the needs of students from age 3 to 21 years with Special Needs or Disabilities. It is mainly an Early Childhood Special Education Center for 3- to 5-year-olds. Emphasis is upon school/parent communication, developmentally appropriate practices, specialized therapies and team approach that allows each student to work toward his or her potential.

As of 2024, the school district has also begun reconstructing parts of the former Blue Springs High School Freshman Center Campus for the production of an all new Career Innovation Center, or CIC. The CIC is a career centered school that focuses on profession-based learning to help prepare students for career and college through multiple Real World Learning opportunities. It currently offers over 19 programs in areas such as aviation (2), business (3), medical and health sciences (6), gaming and technologies (6), teaching and education (1), and hospitality and tourism (1).

== Notable alumni ==
- Brandon Lloyd, former professional wide receiver for the New England Patriots of the NFL
- Ladell Betts, former professional running back for the Washington Redskins of the NFL
- Jon Sundvold, NBA player and All-American college basketball player at the University of Missouri
- David Cook, 7th-season winner of American Idol
- Donald Stephenson, former professional offensive linemen for the Kansas City Chiefs and Denver Broncos
- Steve Harris, former professional basketball player in the NBA
- Darius Hill, former professional football player in the NFL
- Elijah Lee, professional linebacker for the Cleveland Browns
- Deiondre' Hall, professional cornerback for the Chicago Bears
- Darrius Sheperd, professional wide receiver for the Green Bay Packers, Kansas City Chiefs
- Nick Tepesch, professional baseball player in the MLB
- Lonnie Palelei, former professional offensive linemen in the NFL and XFL
- Kris Johnson, professional baseball player formerly in the MLB
- Connor Harris, former professional linebacker for the New York Jets, Arizona Cardinals, Cincinnati Bengals
- Khalil Davis, professional Defensive Lineman for the Pittsburgh Steelers
- Carlos Davis, professional Defensive Lineman for the Pittsburgh Steelers
