= Cam Taylor-Britt =

American football player (born 1999)

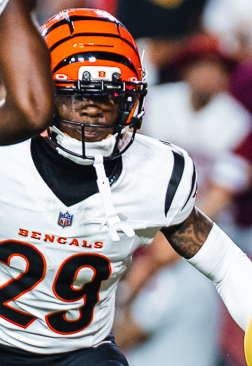
- Taylor-Britt with the Cincinnati Bengals in 2025

No. 29 – Indianapolis Colts
- Position: Cornerback
- Roster status: Injured reserve

Personal information
- Born: October 15, 1999 (age 27); Montgomery, Alabama, U.S.
- Listed height: 5 ft 11 in (1.80 m)
- Listed weight: 200 lb (91 kg)

Career information
- High school: Park Crossing (Montgomery)
- College: Nebraska (2018–2021)
- NFL draft: 2022: 2nd round, 60th overall pick

Career history
- Cincinnati Bengals (2022–2025); Indianapolis Colts (2026–present)

Awards and highlights
- 2× Second-team All-Big Ten (2020, 2021)

Career NFL statistics as of Week 7, 2026
- Total tackles: 216
- Sacks: 1.5
- Forced fumbles: 2
- Pass deflections: 40
- Interceptions: 7
- Defensive touchdowns: 2
- Stats at Pro Football Reference

Cameron Taylor-Britt (born October 15, 1999) is an American professional football cornerback for the Indianapolis Colts of the National Football League (NFL). He played college football for the Nebraska Cornhuskers.

== Early life ==
Taylor-Britt grew up in Benkelman Nebraska, and attended Dundy County-Stratton, where he played quarterback. As a senior, he completed 77 of 130 passing attempts for 1,466 yards and 14 touchdowns and rushed for 1,030 yards and 16 touchdowns on 117 carries. Taylor-Britt initially hoped to play college football for the Auburn Tigers and was recruited by the school, but was not ultimately offered a scholarship. He ultimately committed to play at Nebraska.

== College career ==
Taylor-Britt played in 11 games as a freshman on both defense and special teams and finished the season with 12 total tackles, three passes broken up, and a recovered fumble while on punt coverage. He started seven games at safety and three games at cornerback in his sophomore season. Taylor-Britt was named to the second-team All-Big Ten Conference after starting all seven of Nebraska's games in the team's COVID-19-shortened 2020 season and recorded 28 tackles with four passes broken up and two interceptions. He repeated as a second-team All-Big Ten selection after finishing his senior season with 51 tackles, three tackles for loss, 11 passes broken up, one interception, and one blocked kick.

== Professional career ==
=== Pre-draft ===
On February 5, 2022, Taylor-Britt played in the 2022 Senior Bowl for the American team who lost 10–20 to the National team. He attended the NFL Scouting Combine, but elected to only perform the running drills, like the short shuttle, 40–yard, 20–yard, and 10–yard dash. On March 22, 2022, Taylor-Britt participated at Nebraska's Pro Day and chose to perform the remaining combine drills he had skipped at the NFL Combine, but was not able to perform the bench press due to a shoulder injury. NFL.com lead analyst Lance Zierlein projected Taylor-Britt would be selected in the third round. NFL scout Cory Giddings of Bleacher Report ranked him as the 17th best cornerback prospect (133rd overall) in the draft and projected him to be selected in the fourth round of the 2022 NFL Draft. Michael Renner of Pro Football Focus listed Taylor-Britt as the 10th best cornerback (63rd overall) on his big board. Kevin Hanson of Sports Illustrated had him as the 13th best cornerback available in the draft.

Pre-draft measurables
Height	Weight	Arm length	Hand span	Wingspan	40-yard dash	10-yard split	20-yard split	20-yard shuttle	Three-cone drill	Vertical jump	Broad jump
5 ft 10 5/8 in (1.79 m)	196 lb (89 kg)	31 1/2 in (0.80 m)	10 in (0.25 m)	6 ft 3 in (1.91 m)	4.38 s	1.52 s	2.56 s	4.13 s	6.93 s	33.5 in (0.85 m)	9 ft 11 in (3.02 m)
All values from NFL Combine/Pro Day

=== Cincinnati Bengals ===
The Cincinnati Bengals selected Taylor-Britt in the second round (60th overall) of the 2022 NFL draft. They secured their ability to draft Taylor-Britt by orchestrating a trade where their second (63rd overall) and fifth-round picks (209th overall) in the 2022 NFL Draft were sent to the Buffalo Bills in return for the Bills' second-round pick (60th overall).

External videos
- Bengals select Cam Taylor-Britt No. 60
- 2022 NFL Draft:Call to Cam Taylor-Britt

On May 20, 2022, the Cincinnati Bengals signed Taylor-Britt to a four–year, $5.95 million rookie contract that includes a signing bonus of $509,256.

==== 2022 ====
Throughout training camp, he competed to be a starting cornerback against Eli Apple. On August 19, 2022, it was reported that Taylor-Britt had undergone core muscle surgery after sustaining an injury to his abdomen during training camp and would miss the entire preseason and start of the regular season. On August 30, 2022, the Bengals officially placed him on injured reserve. On October 8, 2022, the Bengals activated him from injured reserve and added him to their active roster after he missed the first six games (Weeks 1–6) of the season. On October 23, 2022, Taylor-Britt made his professional regular season debut and had three solo tackles during a 35–17 win against the Atlanta Falcons. In Week 8, Taylor-Britt earned his first career start in place of Eli Apple who was inactive due to an injury and made five combined tackles (four solo) during a 13–32 loss at the Cleveland Browns. During the game, starting cornerback Chidobe Awuzie tore his ACL and was placed on injured reserve for the rest of the season. Head coach Zac Taylor subsequently named Taylor-Britt a starting cornerback in his place and paired him with Eli Apple starting in Week 9. On November 20, 2022, he set a season-high with 12 combined tackles (nine solo) during a 37–30 victory at the Pittsburgh Steelers. He finished his rookie season with a total of 55 combined tackles (41 solo) and six passes defended in ten games and nine starts. He received an overall grade of 56.1 from Pro Football Focus as a rookie in 2022.

The Cincinnati Bengals finished the 2022 NFL season first in the AFC North with a 12–4 record and clinched a playoff berth. On January 15, 2023, Taylor-Britt started in the first playoff game he appeared in during his career and had two combined tackles (one solo) during a 24–17 victory against the Baltimore Ravens in the AFC Wild-Card Game. On January 22, 2023, he had six solo tackles, two pass deflections, and made his first career interception on a pass thrown by Josh Allen to wide receiver Cole Beasley during a 27–10 victory at the Buffalo Bills in the Divisional Round. On January 29, 2023, Taylor-Britt started in the AFC Championship Game and had three combined tackles (one solo) and a pass deflection during a 20–23 loss at the Kansas City Chiefs.

==== 2023 ====
Taylor-Britt entered training camp slated as the No. 1 starting cornerback under defensive coordinator Lou Anarumo. Head coach Zac Taylor named him and Chidobe Awuzie the starting cornerbacks to begin the season.

On October 8, 2023, Taylor-Britt made one solo tackle, two pass deflections, and had his first career pick-six after intercepting a pass thrown by Joshua Dobbs to wide receiver Zach Pascal and returned it for an 11–yard touchdown during the second quarter of a 34–20 victory at the Arizona Cardinals. The following week, he recorded seven solo tackles, set a season-high with three pass deflections, and intercepted a pass by Geno Smith to wide receiver D. K. Metcalf as the Bengals defeated the Seattle Seahawks 17–13 in Week 6. On November 12, 2023, Taylor-Britt had nine total tackles (seven solo), had two pass deflections, and intercepted a pass attempt thrown by C. J. Stroud to wide receiver Tank Dell during a 30–27 loss against the Houston Texans. On November 16, 2023, Taylor-Britt made one solo tackle and a pass deflection before exiting during the second quarter of the Bengals' 20–34 loss at the Baltimore Ravens after injuring his quadriceps. On December 4, 2023, the Bengals officially placed Taylor-Britt on injured reserve after he aggravated his quadriceps injury during practice. On December 29, 2023, the Bengals activated him from injured reserve and added him back to the active roster after he missed five games (Weeks 12–16). He finished the 2023 NFL season with a total of 50 combined tackles (40 solo), 11 passes defended, a career-high four interceptions, and scored one touchdown in 12 games and 12 starts. He received an overall grade of 64.5 from Pro Football Focus in 2023.

==== 2024 ====
Taylor-Britt returned as the de facto No. 1 starting cornerback and was paired with Daxton Hill, following the departure of Chidobe Awuzie. In Week 8, he set a season-high with nine combined tackles (seven solo) and had one pass deflection during a 17–37 loss at the Philadelphia Eagles. On December 1, 2024, Taylor-Britt made seven combined tackles (four solo), one pass deflection, and intercepted a pass thrown by Russell Wilson to wide receiver George Pickens and returned it for a 51–yard touchdown as the Bengals lost 38–44 against the Pittsburgh Steelers. In Week 15, Taylor-Britt had six solo tackles, tied his season-high with two pass deflections, and intercepted a pass attempt by Will Levis to wide receiver Tyler Boyd during a 37–27 victory at the Tennessee Titans. He started all 17 games for the first time in his first career and had a career-high 77 combined tackles (58 solo), 16 pass deflections, three interceptions, scored one touchdown, and was credited with half a sack. He received an overall grade of 63.6 from Pro Football Focus in 2024, which ranked 96th amongst 222 qualifying cornerbacks.

==== 2025 ====
Taylor-Britt again remained a starter for Cincinnati entering the 2025 campaign. Inconsistent play led to him being benched, and he logged five pass deflections and 21 combined tackles across eight appearances (two starts). In Week 11 against the Pittsburgh Steelers, Taylor-Britt left the game after suffering an injury when he got tangled up with Steelers receiver Calvin Austin III. Following the game, head coach Zac Taylor announced that Taylor-Britt had suffered a Lisfranc injury that would require surgery, putting his season in jeopardy. He was officially placed on injured reserve on November 21, 2025.

=== Indianapolis Colts ===
On March 17, 2026, Taylor-Britt signed a one-year, $1.402 million contract with the Indianapolis Colts. On August 7, Taylor-Britt was suspended for one game without pay due to violating the league's personal conduct policy.

== Career statistics ==
=== NFL ===
==== Regular season ====
Year	Team	Games		Tackles				Interceptions						Fumbles	
Year	Team	GP	GS	Cmb	Solo	Ast	Sck	PD	Int	Yds	Avg	Lng	TD	FF	FR
2022	CIN	10	9	55	41	14	0.0	6	0	0	0.0	0	0	1	0
2023	CIN	11	11	48	39	9	0.0	11	4	65	18.5	30	1	1	0
2024	CIN	17	17	77	58	19	0.5	16	3	79	26.3	51	1	0	0
2025	CIN	8	2	21	12	9	0.0	5	2	0	0.0	0	0	0	0
2026	IND	6	0	13	7	6	1.0	2	0	0	0.0	0	0	0	0
Career		53	40	216	158	58	1.5	40	7	144	20.6	51	2	2	0

==== Postseason ====
Year	Team	Games		Tackles				Interceptions						Fumbles	
Year	Team	GP	GS	Cmb	Solo	Ast	Sck	PD	Int	Yds	Avg	Lng	TD	FF	FR
2022	CIN	3	3	11	8	3	0.0	3	1	0	0.0	0	0	0	0
Career		3	3	11	8	3	0.0	6	0	0	0.0	0	0	1	0

=== College ===
College statistics
Year	School	Conf	G	GS	Tackles					Interceptions			
Year	School	Conf	G	GS	Solo	Ast	Tot	Sacks	Sacks-Yards	Int	PD	FF	FR
2018	Nebraska	B10	9	0	9	3	12	0	0	0	3	0	1
2019	Nebraska	B10	11	10	29	20	49	1.5	0-0	3	4	4	0
2020	Nebraska	B10	8	8	23	5	28	0	0	2	6	1	0
2021	Nebraska	B10	12	12	35	16	51	1	0-0	1	11	2	1

== Personal life ==
On January 6, 2026, Taylor-Britt was sentenced to five days in jail after pleading guilty to reckless driving, as well as driving without a license, stemming from a September 14, 2025 incident in Cincinnati, Ohio.
