= Darrion Daniels =

American football player (born 1997)

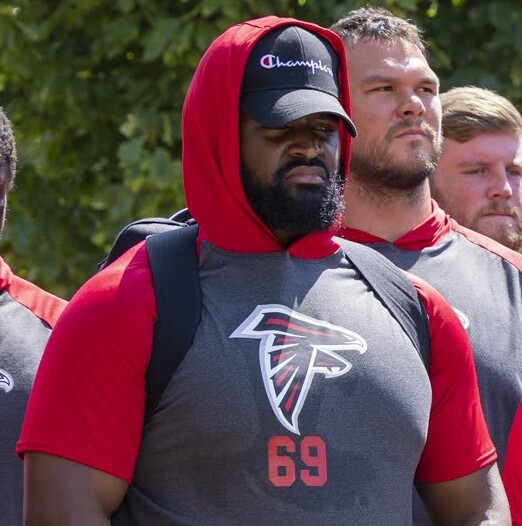
- Daniels with the Atlanta Falcons in 2022

Current position
- Title: Defensive line coach & pass rush specialist
- Team: California
- Conference: ACC

Biographical details
- Born: December 4, 1997 (age 28); Dallas, Texas, U.S.
- Education: Nebraska

Playing career
- 2015–2017: Oklahoma State
- 2018–2019: Nebraska
- 2020–2021: San Francisco 49ers
- 2022: Atlanta Falcons
- 2023: Birmingham Stallions

Coaching career (HC unless noted)
- 2024–2025: Oregon (Defensive analyst)
- 2026–present: California (DL/pass rush specialist)

Accomplishments and honors

Awards
- USFL champion (2023)

Darrion Daniels (born December 4, 1997) is an American former professional football defensive end who is the defensive line coach and pass rush specialist for the California Golden Bears. He played college football at Oklahoma State and Nebraska, and signed with the San Francisco 49ers as an undrafted free agent in 2020.

== College career ==
Daniels was a four-star prospect coming out of Bishop Dunne and committed to the Oklahoma State Cowboys on January 30, 2015. He was named Oklahoma State's most outstanding defensive newcomer in 2015. In 2018, Daniels transferred to Nebraska, where he played with his brother Damion. Daniels was a team captain in 2019 and an honorable mention all-Big Ten player.

== Professional career ==
=== San Francisco 49ers ===
Daniels signed with the San Francisco 49ers as an undrafted free agent following the 2020 NFL draft on April 28, 2020. He was waived during final roster cuts on September 5, 2020, and signed to the team's practice squad the next day. He was elevated to the active roster on October 17, November 28, and December 12 for the team's weeks 6, 12, and 14 games, against the Los Angeles Rams twice and Washington Football Team, and reverted to the practice squad after each game. He was promoted to the active roster on December 25.

On August 31, 2021, Daniels was waived by the 49ers and re-signed to the practice squad the next day.

=== Atlanta Falcons ===
Daniels signed with the Atlanta Falcons on July 27, 2022. He was waived on August 30.

=== Birmingham Stallions ===
Daniels signed with the Birmingham Stallions of the USFL on December 16, 2022. He was released on December 6, 2023.

== Coaching career ==
=== Oregon ===
Daniels was hired by Oregon to be a defensive analyst before the 2024 season.

=== California ===
On December 27, 2025, Daniels was named the defensive coach and pass rush specialist by California.
