= Dicaprio Bootle =

American football player (born 1997)

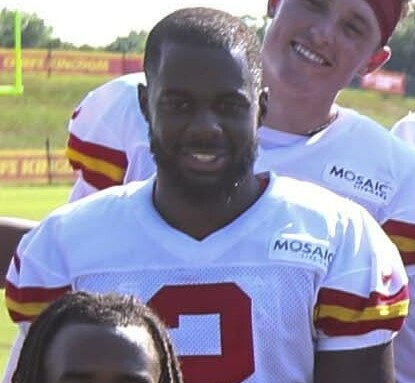
- Bootle with the Chiefs in 2022

Profile
- Position: Cornerback

Personal information
- Born: September 17, 1997 (age 29); Miami, Florida, U.S.
- Listed height: 5 ft 10 in (1.78 m)
- Listed weight: 195 lb (88 kg)

Career information
- High school: Southridge (Miami, Florida)
- College: Nebraska (2016–2020)
- NFL draft: 2021: undrafted

Career history
- Kansas City Chiefs (2021–2022); Carolina Panthers (2023); Los Angeles Chargers (2024); Detroit Lions (2025)*
- * Offseason or practice squad member only

Awards and highlights
- Super Bowl champion (LVII)

Career NFL statistics as of 2023
- Total tackles: 25
- Pass deflections: 2
- Stats at Pro Football Reference

Dicaprio Bootle (born September 17, 1997) is an American professional football cornerback. He played college football for the Nebraska Cornhuskers.

== Early life and college ==
Bootle was born on September 17, 1997, in Miami, Florida. He was named after the actor Leonardo DiCaprio after his mother and aunt watched Titanic, deciding to use the unique name as a homage. He attended Killian High School and Southridge High School, both in Miami. He was ranked in the top-60 in the nation at the cornerback position by ESPN. Bootle received numerous scholarship offers, but only visited Nebraska.

Bootle redshirted in his first season and spent the year on Nebraska's scouting team. In his second year, he played in all 12 games as a redshirt freshman, compiling 15 tackles. His sophomore year, Dicaprio started in all 12 games, and totaled a career-high 39 tackles. He also had his first forced fumble. His 15 pass breakups in 2018 led all Big Ten Conference teams. He was named third-team All-Big Ten for his sophomore performance.

Bootle started the first 8 games of his junior year at cornerback, and finished the year starting at safety. Bootle recorded 31 tackles and six pass breakups in 2019. In his final season, he started every game again, bringing his streak to 32 consecutive starts, and recorded 25 tackles. His first and only career interception came against Iowa.

Bootle chose to forgo remaining eligibility and declare for the 2021 NFL draft.

=== College statistics ===
Year	School	G	GS	Tackles					Interceptions			
Year	School	G	GS	Solo	Ast	Tot	Sacks	Sacks-Yards	Int	PD	FF	FR
2017	Nebraska	12	1	11	4	15	1	1-0	0	0	0	1
2018	Nebraska	12	12	26	13	39	0	0	0	15	0	1
2019	Nebraska	12	12	17	14	31	0	0	0	6	0	1
2020	Nebraska	8	8	16	9	25	0	0	1	5	1	0

== Professional career ==
Pre-draft measurables
Height	Weight	Arm length	Hand span	40-yard dash	10-yard split	20-yard split	20-yard shuttle	Three-cone drill	Vertical jump	Broad jump	Bench press
5 ft 9 1/2 in (1.77 m)	180 lb (82 kg)	30 in (0.76 m)	8 1/2 in (0.22 m)	4.38 s	1.57 s	2.55 s	4.03 s	6.77 s	36.5 in (0.93 m)	10 ft 6 in (3.20 m)	16 reps
Values come from Pro Day.

=== Kansas City Chiefs ===
After going unselected in the 2021 NFL draft, Bootle signed as an undrafted free agent with the Kansas City Chiefs. He was waived on August 31, 2021. He was signed to the practice squad the next day. Prior to Week 4, Bootle was elevated from the practice squad via a standard elevation against the Philadelphia Eagles. Bootle was again elevated from the practice squad in Week 16 against the Pittsburgh Steelers after the defense lost starters for the game due to COVID-19 protocols. He took advantage of the opportunity by leading the team in tackles (7) for the game. On February 2, 2022, Bootle signed a reserve/future contract with the Chiefs.

On August 30, 2022, Bootle was waived by the Chiefs. He was re-signed to the practice squad on September 13 and promoted to the active roster on October 15. He was waived on October 17 and re-signed to the practice squad. Bootle became a Super Bowl champion when the Chiefs defeated the Philadelphia Eagles in Super Bowl LVII. He signed a reserve/future contract on February 15, 2023.

On August 29, 2023, Bootle was waived by the Chiefs.

=== Carolina Panthers ===
On September 11, 2023, Bootle was signed to the Carolina Panthers' practice squad. He was promoted to the active roster on October 11. Bootle was placed on injured reserve on November 22.

On August 27, 2024, Bootle was waived by the Panthers.

=== Los Angeles Chargers ===
On September 11, 2024, Bootle was signed to the Los Angeles Chargers' practice squad. He was promoted to the active roster on October 21. On November 16, Bootle was waived by the Chargers and signed to the practice squad three days later.

=== Detroit Lions ===
On July 18, 2025, Bootle signed with the Detroit Lions. He was placed on injured reserve on August 14, and released on August 24.
