= Cam Jurgens =

American football player (born 1999)

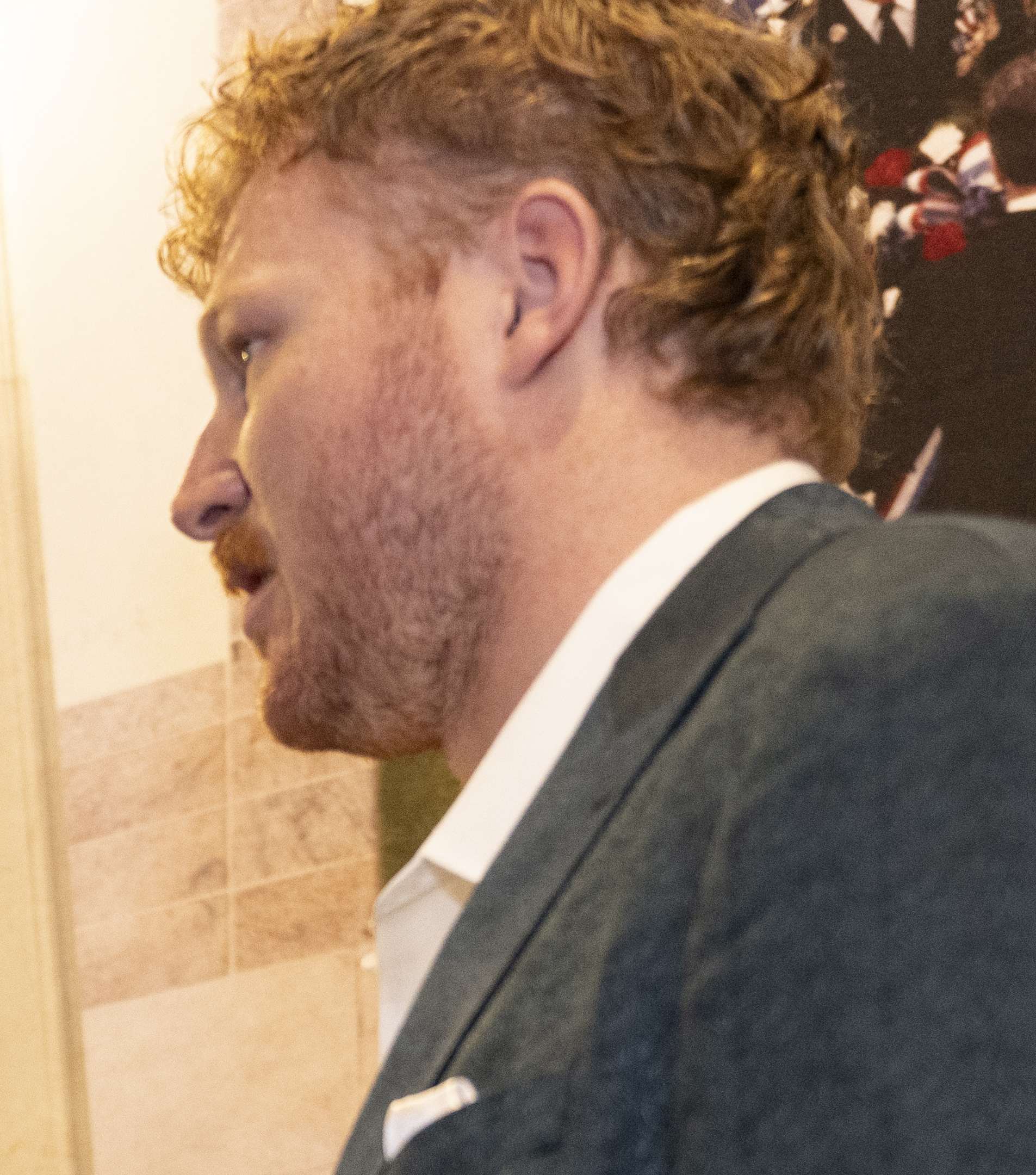
- Jurgens in 2025

No. 64 – Baltimore Ravens
- Position: Center
- Roster status: Active

Personal information
- Born: August 21, 1999 (age 27); Beatrice, Nebraska, U.S.
- Listed height: 6 ft 3 in (1.91 m)
- Listed weight: 303 lb (137 kg)

Career information
- High school: Beatrice
- College: Nebraska (2018–2021)
- NFL draft: 2022: 2nd round, 51st overall pick

Career history
- Philadelphia Eagles (2022–2026); Baltimore Ravens (2026–present)

Awards and highlights
- Super Bowl champion (LIX); 2× Pro Bowl (2024, 2025); Third-team All-Big Ten (2021)

Career NFL statistics as of Week 10, 2026
- Games played: 66
- Games started: 49
- Stats at Pro Football Reference

Cameron Jurgens (born August 21, 1999) is an American professional football center for the Baltimore Ravens of the National Football League (NFL). He played college football for the Nebraska Cornhuskers and was selected by the Philadelphia Eagles in the second round of the 2022 NFL draft.

== Early life ==
Jurgens grew up in Pickrell, Nebraska and attended Beatrice High School. He played tight end, fullback, linebacker, and punter on the football team and also played basketball and threw discus and shot put on the track team.

== College career ==
Jurgens began his freshman season at tight end and appeared in one game before suffering a foot injury and redshirting the rest of the season. After recovering from his injury, he began to practice at the interior offensive line. Jurgens ultimately moved to the center position and was named the Cornhuskers starter going into his redshirt freshman season. He started all 12 of Nebraska's games and was the first freshman to start at center for the team since NCAA restored freshmen eligibility in 1972. Jurgens started seven of Nebraska's eight games in the team's COVID-19-shortened 2020 season. As a redshirt junior, he started all 12 of the Cornhusker's games and was named third-team All-Big Ten Conference by the leagues coaches. Following the end of the season, Jurgens declared that he would forgo his redshirt senior season and enter the 2022 NFL draft.

Jurgens also competed on Nebraska's track and field team in shot put for two seasons.

== Professional career ==
Pre-draft measurables
Height	Weight	Arm length	Hand span	Wingspan	40-yard dash	10-yard split	20-yard split	20-yard shuttle	Three-cone drill	Vertical jump	Broad jump	Bench press
6 ft 2 7/8 in (1.90 m)	303 lb (137 kg)	33 3/8 in (0.85 m)	10 in (0.25 m)	6 ft 8 1/8 in (2.04 m)	4.92 s	1.71 s	2.85 s	4.49 s	7.19 s	33.5 in (0.85 m)	9 ft 11 in (3.02 m)	25 reps
All values from NFL Combine/Pro Day

=== Philadelphia Eagles ===
Jurgens was drafted by the Philadelphia Eagles in the second round (51st overall) of the 2022 NFL draft; Jason Kelce, the Eagles All-Pro center who had been with the team since 2011, helped general manager Howie Roseman handpick Jurgens to serve as Kelce's eventual successor at the center position. As a rookie during his 2022 season, he appeared in all 17 regular season games and the three postseason games, including Super Bowl LVII, for the Eagles.

Jurgens entered the 2023 season as the Eagles starting right guard. He suffered a foot injury in Week 4 and was placed on injured reserve on October 7, 2023. He was activated on November 18. He made 11 appearances and starts in the 2023 regular season. He started in the Wild Card Round loss to the Buccaneers.

Jurgens took over the starting center role for the Eagles when Kelce retired during the 2024 offseason, and he helped the 2024 Eagles win Super Bowl LIX while also earning 2024 Pro Bowl honors.

On April 21, 2025, Jurgens signed a four-year, $68 million contract extension with the Eagles. He started all 14 of his appearances for Philadelphia during the regular season. On February 20, 2026, Jurgens underwent a back procedure to alleviate nerve pain that had plagued him during the latter part of the year.

=== Baltimore Ravens ===
On October 7, 2026, Jurgens was traded by the Eagles to the Baltimore Ravens in exchange for a fifth-round pick in 2027 draft and a second-round pick in the 2028 draft.

== Personal life ==
Jurgens has his own line of beef jerky called Beef Jurgy.
