= Chris Kolarevic =

American gridiron football player (born 1999)

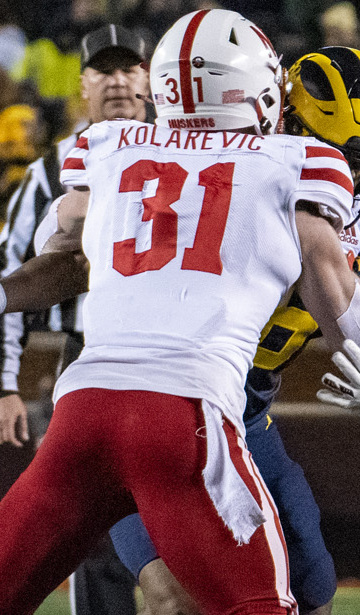
- Kolarevic with Nebraska in 2022

No. 48
- Position: Linebacker

Personal information
- Born: July 14, 1999 (age 27); Traverse City, Michigan, U.S.
- Listed height: 6 ft 1 in (1.85 m)
- Listed weight: 225 lb (102 kg)

Career information
- High school: St. Francis (Traverse City)
- College: Northern Iowa (2017–2019); Nebraska (2021–2022)
- NFL draft: 2023: undrafted

Career history
- 2023: Hamilton Tiger-Cats

Awards and highlights
- Second-team All-MVFC (2019)
- Stats at CFL.ca

Chris Kolarevic (born July 14, 1999) is an American former football linebacker. He played college football at Northern Iowa and Nebraska, and professionally for the Hamilton Tiger-Cats of the Canadian Football League (CFL).

== Early life ==
Kolarevic played high school football at St. Francis High School in Traverse City, Michigan, earning all-state honors his senior year.

== College career ==
Kolarevic played college football at Northern Iowa from 2018 to 2019. He was redshirted in 2017. He played in six games in 2018 before suffering an injury, recording 65 tackles (including 3.0 for loss), one interception, and four breakups. Kolarevic earned HERO Sports first-team FCS freshman All-American honors for his performance during the 2018 season. He appeared in 10 games in 2019, totaling 79 tackles (including 6.5 for loss), two sacks, one pass breakup, one forced fumble, and one interception that was returned for a touchdown. He was named the Missouri Valley Football Conference (MVFC) Defensive Player of the Week twice during the 2019 season, and also earned second-team All-MVFC honors. The 2020 season was cancelled due to the COVID-19 pandemic.

Kolarevic transferred to play at Nebraska from 2021 to 2022. He played in every game in 2021, accumulating 27 tackles (including 1.0 for loss). He again played in every game in 2022, recording 33 tackles (including 1.0 for loss) and one blocked punt. Kolarevic also had a game-sealing interception against Iowa on November 25, 2022.

== Professional career ==
Pre-draft measurables
Height	Weight	Arm length	Hand span	40-yard dash	10-yard split	20-yard split	20-yard shuttle	Three-cone drill	Vertical jump	Broad jump	Bench press
6 ft 1 in (1.85 m)	224 lb (102 kg)	31 1/4 in (0.79 m)	10 1/8 in (0.26 m)	4.66 s	1.59 s	2.70 s	4.22 s	6.88 s	38.0 in (0.97 m)	10 ft 4 in (3.15 m)	21 reps
All values from Pro Day

After going undrafted in the 2023 NFL draft, Kolarevic attended rookie mini-camp on a tryout basis with both the Chicago Bears and New Orleans Saints in May 2023. Kolarevic was signed to the practice roster of the Hamilton Tiger-Cats of the Canadian Football League (CFL) on August 1, 2023. He was promoted to the active roster on September 2, moved back to the practice roster on September 14, and promoted to the active roster again on October 25. He was placed on injured reserve on November 3, 2023. Overall, Kolarevic dressed in three games for the Tiger-Cats in 2023, recording one special teams tackle. He retired on May 6, 2024.

== Coaching career ==
In 2025, Kolarevic became the linebackers coach at Iowa Western Community College. He helped them win the NJCAA Division I national championship during the 2025 junior college football season.
