= Ben Stille =

American football player (born 1997)

Profile
- Position: Defensive tackle

Personal information
- Born: November 12, 1997 (age 29); Ashland, Nebraska, U.S.
- Listed height: 6 ft 4 in (1.93 m)
- Listed weight: 296 lb (134 kg)

Career information
- High school: Ashland-Greenwood
- College: Nebraska (2016–2021)
- NFL draft: 2022: undrafted

Career history
- Miami Dolphins (2022); Cleveland Browns (2022); Arizona Cardinals (2023–2024); Tampa Bay Buccaneers (2024); Arizona Cardinals (2024); Miami Dolphins (2025)*; Atlanta Falcons (2025)*; Detroit Lions (2026)*
- * Offseason or practice squad member only

Career NFL statistics as of 2024
- Total tackles: 17
- Sacks: 2.0
- Stats at Pro Football Reference

Ben Stille (born November 12, 1997) is an American professional football defensive tackle. He played college football for the Nebraska Cornhuskers and was signed by the Miami Dolphins as an undrafted free agent in 2022.

== Professional career ==
Pre-draft measurables
Height	Weight	Arm length	Hand span	Wingspan	40-yard dash	10-yard split	20-yard split	20-yard shuttle	Three-cone drill	Vertical jump	Broad jump	Bench press
6 ft 4 in (1.93 m)	300 lb (136 kg)	32 1/8 in (0.82 m)	9 1/2 in (0.24 m)	6 ft 7 1/4 in (2.01 m)	4.98 s	1.77 s	2.88 s	4.29 s	7.45 s	32.0 in (0.81 m)	9 ft 8 in (2.95 m)	22 reps
All values from Nebraska's Pro Day

=== Miami Dolphins ===
On April 30, 2022, Stille signed with the Miami Dolphins as an undrafted free agent following the 2022 NFL draft. On August 30, the Dolphins released Stille, On September 1, Stille was re-signed to the Dolphins' practice squad. On October 22, the Dolphins elevated Stille to their active roster. The next day, Stille made his NFL debut, playing nine snaps and totaling two tackles.

=== Cleveland Browns ===
On November 15, 2022, the Cleveland Browns signed Stille off the Dolphins' practice squad. On May 9, 2023, Stille was waived by the Browns.

=== Arizona Cardinals ===
On May 10, 2023, Stille was claimed off waivers by the Arizona Cardinals. He was waived on August 30, and re-signed to the practice squad. He was promoted to the active roster on November 21. Stille was released on November 28 and re-signed to the practice squad two days later. He was promoted back to the active roster on January 5, 2024.

Stille was waived by the Cardinals on August 27, 2024, and re-signed to the practice squad.

=== Tampa Bay Buccaneers ===
On September 6, 2024, Stille was signed by the Tampa Bay Buccaneers off the Cardinals practice squad. He was waived on September 30.

=== Arizona Cardinals (second stint) ===
On October 3, 2024, Stille was signed to the Arizona Cardinals practice squad. He signed a reserve/future contract with Arizona on January 6, 2025. On May 22, Stille was waived by the Cardinals.

=== Miami Dolphins (second stint) ===
On June 5, 2025, Stille signed with the Miami Dolphins. He was waived on August 26 as part of final roster cuts.

=== Atlanta Falcons ===
On November 11, 2025, Stille signed with the Atlanta Falcons' practice squad. He signed a reserve/future contract with Atlanta on January 5, 2026. Stille was released by the Falcons on May 11.

=== Detroit Lions ===
On August 7, 2026, Stille signed with the Detroit Lions. On August 30, Stille was released by the Lions as a part of final roster cuts; he was re-signed to the team's practice squad the following day.On November 17, Stille was released from the practice squad.

== Personal life ==
Stille is a Christian. He is married to his wife, Samantha.
