= Carlos Davis (American football) =

American football player (born 1996)

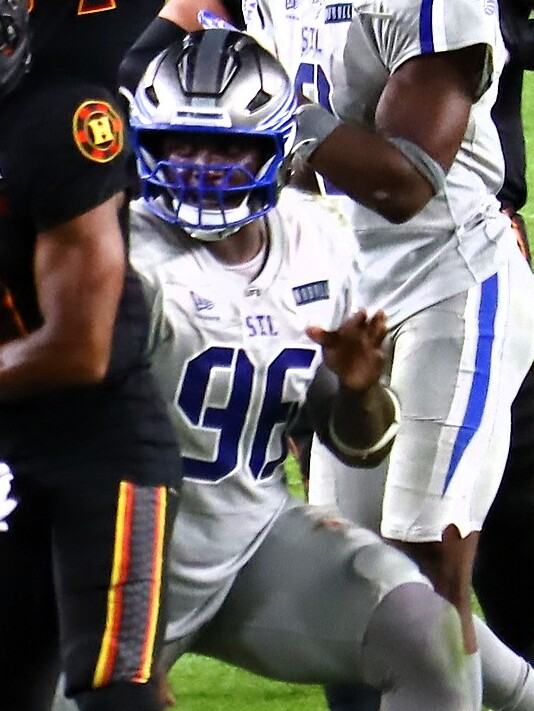
- Davis with the St. Louis Battlehawks in 2026

No. 96 – St. Louis Battlehawks
- Position: Nose tackle
- Roster status: Active

Personal information
- Born: August 22, 1996 (age 30); Blue Springs, Missouri, U.S.
- Listed height: 6 ft 2 in (1.88 m)
- Listed weight: 305 lb (138 kg)

Career information
- High school: Blue Springs
- College: Nebraska (2015–2019)
- NFL draft: 2020: 7th round, 232nd overall pick

Career history
- Pittsburgh Steelers (2020–2022); Atlanta Falcons (2023)*; Birmingham Stallions (2024); Cincinnati Bengals (2024)*; Birmingham Stallions (2025); St. Louis Battlehawks (2026–present)
- * Offseason or practice squad member only

Awards and highlights
- UFL champion (2024); 2x All-UFL Team (Note: for 2024 and 2026) (2024, 2026)

Career NFL statistics as of 2023
- Total tackles: 12
- Sacks: 1
- Stats at Pro Football Reference

Carlos Davis (born August 22, 1996) is an American professional football nose tackle for the St. Louis Battlehawks of the United Football League (UFL). He played college football at Nebraska.

== College career ==
Davis was an All-American in track and field at Nebraska in addition to football. He started 11 of 12 games as a defensive end as a senior and had 32 tackles. In his career, he compiled 125 total tackles, 18 tackles for a loss and nine and a half sacks.

== Professional career ==
Pre-draft measurables
| Height | Weight | Arm length | Hand span | Wingspan | 40-yard dash | 10-yard split | 20-yard split | 20-yard shuttle | Vertical jump | Broad jump | Bench press |
|---|---|---|---|---|---|---|---|---|---|---|---|
| 6 ft 2 in (1.88 m) | 313 lb (142 kg) | 32 in (0.81 m) | 9 5/8 in (0.24 m) | 6 ft 4 1/2 in (1.94 m) | 4.82 s | 1.67 s | 2.78 s | 4.52 s | 27.5 in (0.70 m) | 8 ft 7 in (2.62 m) | 27 reps |
All values from NFL Combine/Pro Day

=== Pittsburgh Steelers ===
He ran a 4.82-second 40 yard dash at the combine, placing him in a tie for ninth among defensive linemen. Davis was selected in the seventh round of the 2020 NFL draft with the 232nd overall pick by the Pittsburgh Steelers. He played 7 games during his rookie season of 2020, finishing with 6 tackles.

On October 27, 2021, Davis was placed on injured reserve. He was activated on December 4.

On August 30, 2022, Davis was waived by the Steelers and signed to the practice squad the next day.

=== Atlanta Falcons ===
On June 7, 2023, Davis signed with the Atlanta Falcons. He was waived by the Falcons on August 29.

=== Atlanta Falcons (second stint) ===
On October 6, 2023, Davis signed with the Birmingham Stallions of the United States Football League. He was released on December 22, to sign with the Falcons. Davis did not sign a reserve/future contract after the season and thus became a free agent upon the expiration of his practice squad contract.

=== Birmingham Stallions ===
Davis was re-signed by the Stallions on January 19, 2024. He was named to the 2024 All-UFL team on June 5. Davis' contract was terminated by the team on August 8.

=== Cincinnati Bengals ===
On August 8, 2024, Davis signed with the Cincinnati Bengals. He was waived by the Bengals on August 27.

=== Birmingham Stallions (second stint) ===
Davis was re-signed by the Stallions on December 18, 2024.

=== St. Louis Battlehawks ===
On January 13, 2026, Davis was selected by the St. Louis Battlehawks in the 2026 UFL draft.

=== Statistics ===
| Year | Team | GP | COMB | TOTAL | AST | SACK | FF | FR | FR YDS | PD |
|---|---|---|---|---|---|---|---|---|---|---|
| 2020 | PIT | 7 | 6 | 4 | 2 | 0 | 0 | 0 | 0 | 0 |
| 2021 | PIT | 4 | 5 | 3 | 2 | 0 | 0 | 0 | 0 | 0 |
| Career | | 11 | 11 | 7 | 4 | 0.0 | 0 | 0 | 0 | 0 |

== Personal life ==
Davis is the twin brother of Khalil Davis. Khalil and Carlos were adopted by their parents Carl and Tracy Davis when they were 9 months old.
