= Khalil Davis =

American football player (born 1996)

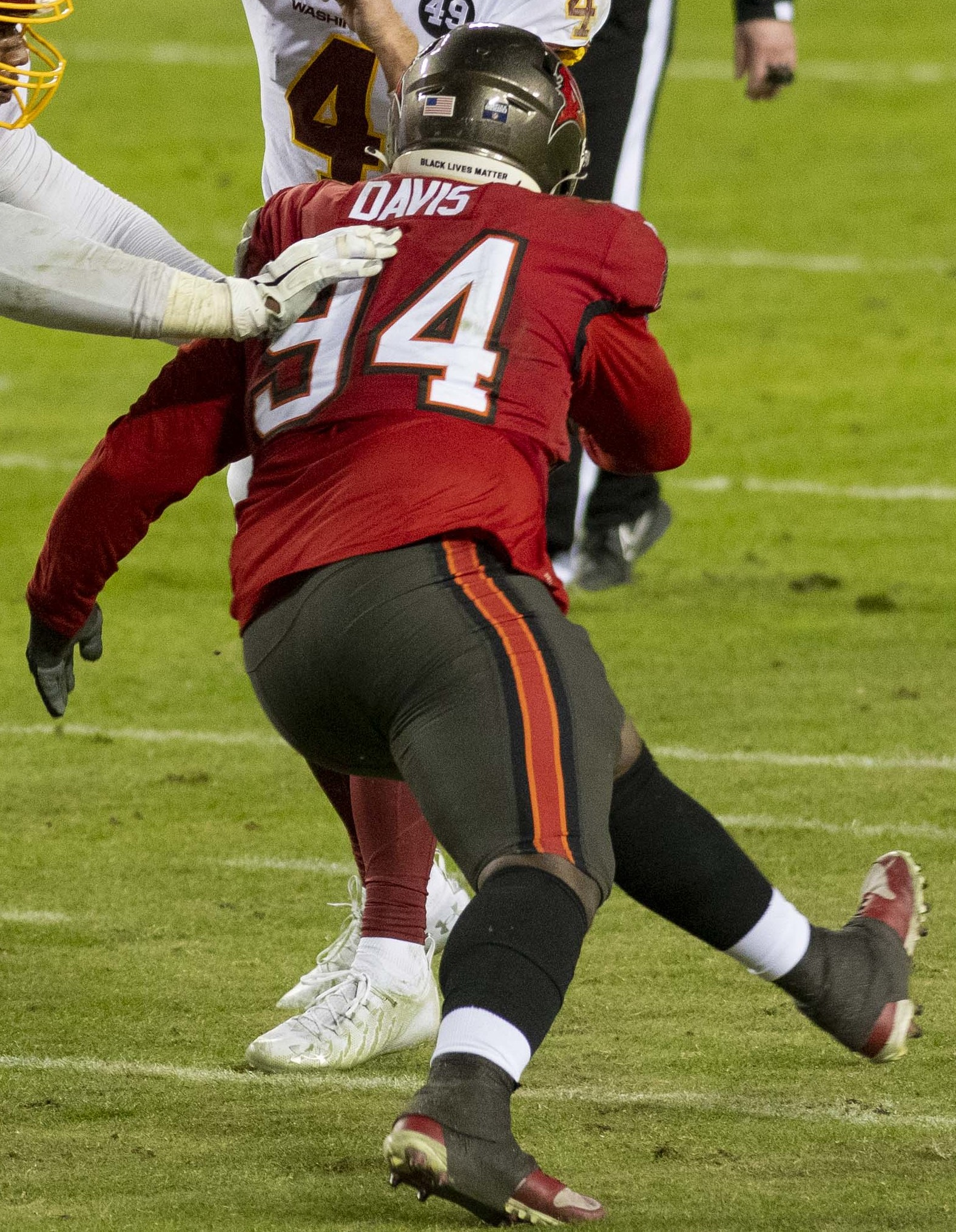
- Davis with the Tampa Bay Buccaneers in 2021

No. 94, 74, 50
- Position: Defensive tackle

Personal information
- Born: August 22, 1996 (age 30); Blue Springs, Missouri, U.S.
- Listed height: 6 ft 1 in (1.85 m)
- Listed weight: 308 lb (140 kg)

Career information
- High school: Blue Springs
- College: Nebraska (2015–2019)
- NFL draft: 2020: 6th round, 194th overall pick

Career history
- Tampa Bay Buccaneers (2020–2021); Indianapolis Colts (2021); Pittsburgh Steelers (2021); Tampa Bay Buccaneers (2022)*; Los Angeles Rams (2022)*; Birmingham Stallions (2023); Houston Texans (2023–2024); San Francisco 49ers (2024); Birmingham Stallions (2026)*
- * Offseason or practice squad member only

Awards and highlights
- Super Bowl champion (LV); USFL champion (2023); Third-team All-Big Ten (2019)

Career NFL statistics
- Total tackles: 46
- Sacks: 3
- Forced fumbles: 1
- Fumble recoveries: 1
- Pass deflections: 2
- Stats at Pro Football Reference

Khalil Davis (born August 22, 1996) is an American former professional football player who was a defensive tackle in the National Football League (NFL). He played college football for the Nebraska Cornhuskers. He was a member of the Tampa Bay Buccaneers, Indianapolis Colts, Pittsburgh Steelers, Los Angeles Rams, Houston Texans, and San Francisco 49ers.

== College career ==
A four-star recruit, Davis committed to Nebraska over offers from Arkansas, Indiana, and Oregon, among other schools. He made 11 starts in 47 games. He was named the Cornhuskers' Defensive Lineman of the Year in both the 2018 and 2019 seasons, after recording 11.0 sacks and 26 tackles for loss. He had eight sacks as a senior and led Nebraska with 45 tackles.

Davis was also a successful thrower for the Nebraska Cornhuskers track and field team, qualifying for the 2019 NCAA Division I Outdoor Track and Field Championships in the discus throw.

== Professional career ==
Pre-draft measurables
Height	Weight	Arm length	Hand span	40-yard dash	10-yard split	20-yard split	Vertical jump	Broad jump	Bench press
6 ft 1 in (1.85 m)	308 lb (140 kg)	31 1/2 in (0.80 m)	9 3/4 in (0.25 m)	4.75 s	1.66 s	2.75 s	32.5 in (0.83 m)	9 ft 5 in (2.87 m)	32 reps
All values from NFL Combine/Pro Day

=== Tampa Bay Buccaneers ===
At the NFL Combine, Davis ran the 40-yard dash in 4.75 seconds, the sixth-fastest time for a defensive lineman. He was selected with the 194th overall pick in the 2020 NFL draft by the Tampa Bay Buccaneers. Davis earned a Super Bowl championship when the Buccaneers won Super Bowl LV.

On October 2, 2021, Davis was waived by the Buccaneers.

=== Indianapolis Colts ===
On October 5, 2021, the Indianapolis Colts claimed Davis off waivers. On October 30, 2021, Davis was waived by the Colts.

=== Pittsburgh Steelers ===
On November 2, 2021, Davis was signed to the Pittsburgh Steelers practice squad. He signed a reserve/future contract with the Steelers on January 18, 2022. On August 30, Davis was waived by the Steelers.

=== Tampa Bay Buccaneers (second stint) ===
On September 21, 2022, Davis was signed to the Buccaneers practice squad. He was released on November 29.

=== Los Angeles Rams ===
On December 14, 2022, Davis signed with the practice squad of the Los Angeles Rams. His practice squad contract expired when the team's season ended on January 9, 2023.

=== Birmingham Stallions ===
On March 28, 2023, Davis signed with the Birmingham Stallions of the United States Football League (USFL). He was released from his contract on July 27, to sign with an NFL team.

=== Houston Texans ===
On August 6, 2023, Davis signed with the Houston Texans. He was waived on August 29, and re-signed to the practice squad. He was promoted to the active roster on September 30.

=== San Francisco 49ers ===
On November 5, 2024, the Texans traded Davis to the San Francisco 49ers in exchange for a seventh-round pick in the 2026 draft. In three appearances for the 49ers, he recorded three combined tackles.

On July 21, 2025, Davis announced his retirement from professional football.

=== Birmingham Stallions (second stint) ===
On September 3, 2025, Davis came out of retirement and signed with the Birmingham Stallions of the United Football League (UFL), reuniting with his twin brother Carlos Davis.

== NFL career statistics ==
Legend
	Won the Super Bowl
**Bold**	Career high

Year	Team	Games		Tackles				Interceptions						Fumbles			
Year	Team	GP	GS	Comb	Solo	Ast	Sack	PD	Int	Yds	Avg	Lng	TD	FF	FR	Yds	TD
2020	TB	2	0	2	1	1	0.0	0	0	0	0.0	0	0	0	0	0	0
2021	IND	1	0	0	0	0	0.0	0	0	0	0.0	0	0	0	0	0	0
2023	HOU	**15**	**1**	**32**	**16**	**16**	**2.0**	**2**	0	0	0.0	0	0	**1**	**1**	0	0
2024	HOU	9	0	9	6	3	1.0	0	0	0	0	0	0	0	0	0	0
2024	SF	3	0	3	1	2	0	0	0	0	0	0	0	0	0	0	0
Career		30	1	46	24	22	3.0	2	0	0	0.0	0	0	1	1	0	0

== Personal life ==
Davis is the twin brother of Carlos Davis. Khalil and Carlos were adopted by their parents Carl and Tracy Davis when they were nine months old.
