= Casey Rogers =

American football player (born 1998)

Profile
- Position: Defensive end

Personal information
- Born: December 18, 1998 (age 27); Columbus, Ohio, U.S.
- Listed height: 6 ft 4 in (1.93 m)
- Listed weight: 294 lb (133 kg)

Career information
- High school: Westhill (Syracuse, New York); Avon Old Farms (Avon, Connecticut)
- College: Nebraska (2018–2021); Oregon (2022–2023)
- NFL draft: 2024: undrafted

Career history
- New York Giants (2024); Buffalo Bills (2025)*; New York Giants (2025)*; DC Defenders (2026); New England Patriots (2026)*
- * Offseason or practice squad member only
- Stats at Pro Football Reference

Casey Rogers (born December 18, 1998) is an American professional football defensive end. He played college football for the Nebraska Cornhuskers and Oregon Ducks.

== Early life ==
Rogers attended high school at Westhill. Coming out of high school, Rogers was a lacrosse player who decided to commit to play for the Syracuse Orange. After de-committing from Syracuse to play football, Rogers garnered interest from Alabama, Nebraska, Ohio State, Ole Miss, and Vanderbilt. However Rogers decided to pursue football and committed to play college football for the Nebraska Cornhuskers.

== College career ==
=== Nebraska ===
During the 2018 season, Rogers decided to redshirt and missed the entire season with an injury. In 2019, Rogers appeared in four games where he recorded no statistics. In the 2020 season, Rogers made 25 tackles with three being for a loss, a sack, and a forced fumble. During the 2021 season, Rogers notched 17 tackles with three being for a loss, and half a sack. After the conclusion of the 2021 season, Rogers decided to enter his name into the NCAA transfer portal.

=== Oregon ===
Rogers decided to transfer to play for the Oregon Ducks. During the 2022 season, Rogers posted 34 tackles with three and a half being for a loss, and two pass deflections. In week three of the 2023 season, Rogers recorded 18 yards on a fake punt conversion, as he helped Oregon beat Colorado. In week ten, Rogers two tackles, a sack, and a forced fumble, as he helped the Ducks beat California. Rogers finished the 2023 season notching 22 tackles with two and a half being for a loss, a sack and a half, and a forced fumble. After the conclusion of the 2023 season, Rogers decided to declare for the 2024 NFL draft.

== Professional career ==
Pre-draft measurables
Height	Weight	Arm length	Hand span	Wingspan	40-yard dash	10-yard split	20-yard split	20-yard shuttle	Three-cone drill	Vertical jump	Broad jump	Bench press
6 ft 4 3/8 in (1.94 m)	294 lb (133 kg)	32 in (0.81 m)	9 in (0.23 m)	6 ft 6 1/2 in (1.99 m)	4.82 s	1.75 s	2.84 s	4.51 s	7.45 s	35.0 in (0.89 m)	9 ft 8 in (2.95 m)	25 reps
All values from Pro Day

=== New York Giants ===
Rogers went undrafted in the 2024 NFL draft but was signed by the New York Giants on April 28, 2024 as an undrafted free agent. He was waived on August 27, and re-signed to the practice squad. On December 7, Rogers was promoted to the active roster. He was waived on December 24, and re-signed to the practice squad. He signed a reserve/future contract on January 6, 2025.

On May 8, 2025, Rogers was waived by the Giants.

=== Buffalo Bills ===
On May 9, 2025, Rogers was claimed off waivers by the Buffalo Bills. He was released on August 26 as part of final roster cuts.

=== New York Giants (second stint) ===
On December 8, 2025, Rogers was signed to the New York Giants' practice squad.

=== DC Defenders ===
On January 27, 2026, Rogers signed with the DC Defenders of the United Football League (UFL).

=== New England Patriots ===
On August 3, 2026, Rogers signed with the New England Patriots. On August 30, he was waived by New England as part of final roster cuts.
