= JoJo Domann =

American football player (born 1997)

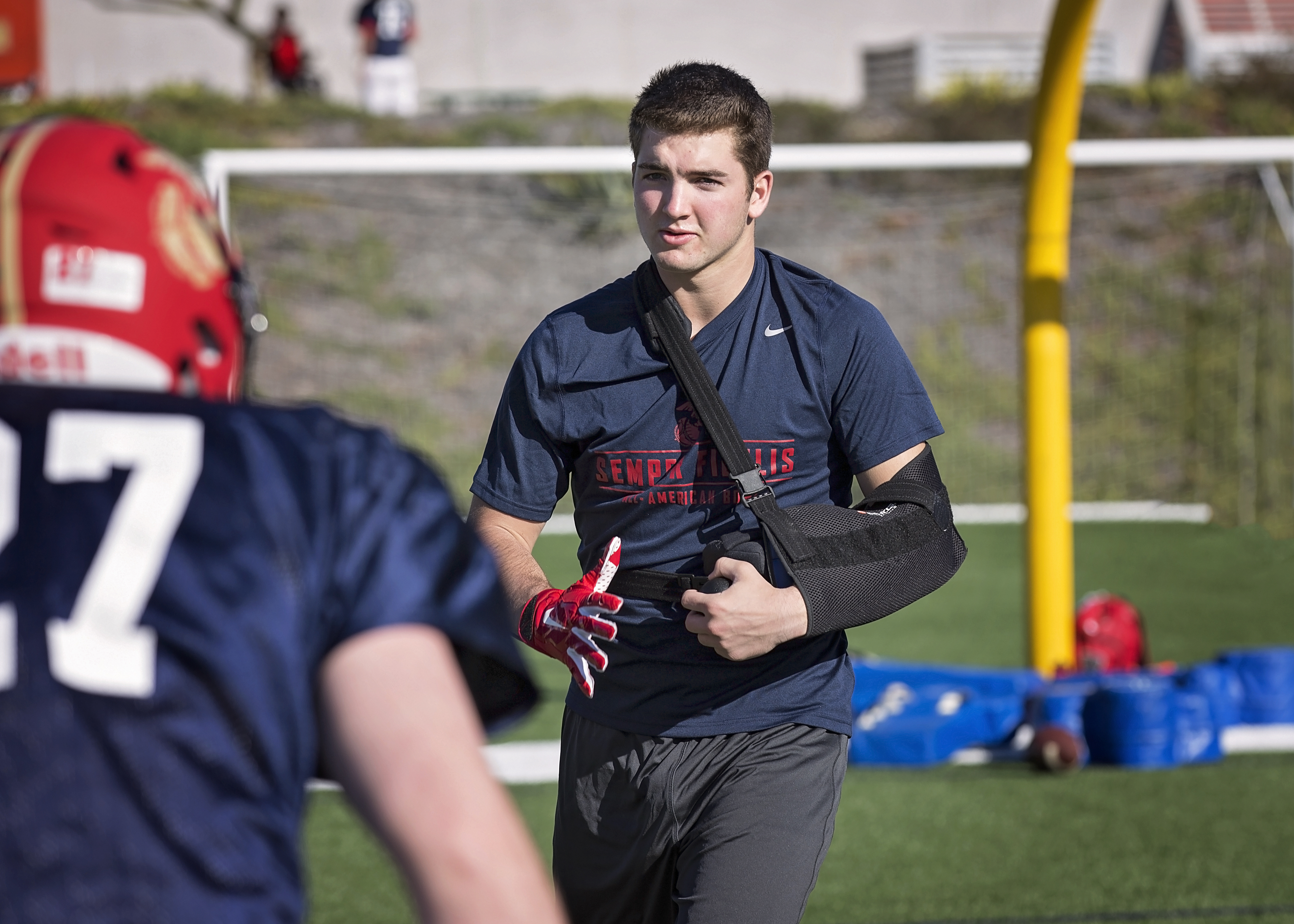
- Domann in 2016

Profile
- Position: Linebacker

Personal information
- Born: July 28, 1997 (age 29); Colorado Springs, Colorado, U.S.
- Listed height: 6 ft 1 in (1.85 m)
- Listed weight: 230 lb (104 kg)

Career information
- High school: Pine Creek (Colorado Springs, Colorado)
- College: Nebraska (2016–2021)
- NFL draft: 2022: undrafted

Career history
- Indianapolis Colts (2022); Tennessee Titans (2023); Birmingham Stallions (2025)*
- * Offseason or practice squad member only

Awards and highlights
- Second-team All-American (2021); Second-team All-Big Ten (2021)

Career NFL statistics
- Total tackles: 11
- Defensive touchdowns: 1
- Stats at Pro Football Reference

JoJo Domann (born July 28, 1997) is an American professional football linebacker. He played college football for the Nebraska Cornhuskers.

== Early life ==
Domann attended Pine Creek High School in Colorado Springs, Colorado. He played wide receiver and safety in high school. As a senior in 2015, he was the Gatorade Football Player of the Year for Colorado. He committed to the University of Nebraska–Lincoln to play college football.

== College career ==
Domann played at Nebraska for five seasons from 2016 to 2021. He played linebacker and safety. During his career he had 207 total tackles (solo and assisted), 5.5 sacks and two interceptions.

== Professional career ==
Pre-draft measurables
Height	Weight	Arm length	Hand span	Wingspan	40-yard dash	10-yard split	20-yard split	20-yard shuttle	Three-cone drill	Vertical jump	Broad jump	Bench press
6 ft 1 1/4 in (1.86 m)	228 lb (103 kg)	30 3/8 in (0.77 m)	9 1/2 in (0.24 m)	6 ft 2 1/2 in (1.89 m)	4.60 s	1.64 s	2.63 s	4.32 s	6.88 s	36.5 in (0.93 m)	10 ft 1 in (3.07 m)	15 reps
All values from NFL Combine/Pro Day

=== Indianapolis Colts ===
Domann signed with the Indianapolis Colts as an undrafted free agent on May 13, 2022. He was one of three undrafted free agents to make the final roster, along with cornerback Dallis Flowers and center Wesley French. He played in 16 games exclusively on special teams as a rookie.

On August 29, 2023, Domann was placed on injured reserve, then released on September 8.

=== Tennessee Titans ===
On December 6, 2023, Domann was signed to the Tennessee Titans practice squad. He was signed to the 53-man roster on December 23.

Domann was waived by the Titans with an injury designation on August 26, 2024.

=== Birmingham Stallions ===
On March 19, 2025, Domann signed with the Birmingham Stallions of the United Football League (UFL). He was released on March 20, 2025.

== Personal life ==
When the NCAA approved the Name, Image and Likeness policy on June 30, 2021, Domann was quick to act and hosted the first Husker college player-led football camp for the youth. On July 17, 2021, The first annual Stille and Domann Youth Football Camp took place and had about 150 participants. Drills were conducted mainly by current Husker football players, and the speed portion of the camp was led by Husker All-American sprinter Levi Gipson.
