= 2008 Kansas Jayhawks football team =

American college football season

2008 Kansas Jayhawks football

Insight Bowl champion

Insight Bowl, W 42–21 vs. Minnesota
- Conference: Big 12 Conference
- North
- Record: 8–5 (4–4 Big 12)
- Head coach: Mark Mangino (7th season)
- Offensive coordinator: Ed Warinner (2nd season)
- Offensive scheme: Spread
- Defensive coordinator: Clint Bowen (3rd season)
- Base defense: 4–3
- Home stadium: Memorial Stadium

2008 Big 12 Conference football standings
	Conf.			Overall
Team	W		L	W		L
North Division
No. 19 Missouri xy	5	–	3	10	–	4
Nebraska x	5	–	3	9	–	4
Kansas	4	–	4	8	–	5
Colorado	2	–	6	5	–	7
Kansas State	2	–	6	5	–	7
Iowa State	0	–	8	2	–	10
South Division
No. 5 Oklahoma xy$	7	–	1	12	–	2
No. 4 Texas x%	7	–	1	12	–	1
No. 12 Texas Tech x	7	–	1	11	–	2
No. 16 Oklahoma State	5	–	3	9	–	4
Baylor	2	–	6	4	–	8
Texas A&M	2	–	6	4	–	8
Championship: Oklahoma 62, Missouri 21
$ – BCS representative as conference champion; % – BCS at-large representative; x – Division champion/co-champions; y – Championship game participant; Rankings from AP Poll

The 2008 Kansas Jayhawks football team represented the University of Kansas in the 2008 NCAA Division I FBS football season. It was the school's 119th year of intercollegiate football. The team was looking to continue the success of the prior season in which they lost only a single conference game and went on to win the Orange Bowl. In the ninth week, after defeating Kansas State 52–21, the Jayhawks became Bowl eligible for the fourth consecutive year, a school record. Also, for the first time in school history, Kansas made back-to-back appearances in a Bowl game after accepting the invitation to play in the Insight Bowl versus the Minnesota Golden Gophers. The team finished the regular season with a victory over their archrival, the Missouri Tigers (who was then ranked 13th in the BCS Poll), in the Border War. The Jayhawks concluded the season with an 8–5 overall record (4–4 in the Big 12 Conference).

The team was led by head coach Mark Mangino, in his seventh season, with Ed Warinner as the offensive coordinator for his second season (fourth year overall) and Clint Bowen (eighth year) in his first season as the defensive coordinator, having served the previous two seasons as co-defensive coordinator. Junior Todd Reesing returned to the starting quarterback position after a record-setting performance in the previous season.

After this season, Kansas went into a lengthy downfall, the team would not return to a bowl game until 2022, and would not record a winning season until 2023.

They played their home games at Memorial Stadium in Lawrence, Kansas.

== Schedule ==
Date	Time	Opponent	Rank	Site	TV	Result	Attendance
August 30	6:00 p.m.	FIU*	No. 14	Memorial Stadium; Lawrence, KS	FSN	W 40–10	52,112
September 6	6:00 p.m.	Louisiana Tech*	No. 14	Memorial Stadium; Lawrence, KS	FSN	W 29–0	48,621
September 12	7:00 p.m.	at No. 19 South Florida*	No. 13	Raymond James Stadium; Tampa, FL	ESPN2	L 34–37	58,755
September 20	6:00 p.m.	Sam Houston State*	No. 19	Memorial Stadium; Lawrence, KS	FCS	W 38–14	51,767
October 4	11:30 a.m.	at Iowa State	No. 16	Jack Trice Stadium; Ames, IA	Versus	W 35–33	47,847
October 11	11:30 a.m.	Colorado	No. 16	Memorial Stadium; Lawrence, KS	ESPN2	W 30–14	49,566
October 18	2:30 p.m.	at No. 4 Oklahoma	No. 16	Gaylord Family Oklahoma Memorial Stadium; Norman, OK	ABC	L 31–45	85,241
October 25	11:00 a.m.	No. 8 Texas Tech^{†}	No. 19	Memorial Stadium; Lawrence, KS	ESPN	L 21–63	50,125
November 1	11:30 a.m.	Kansas State		Memorial Stadium; Lawrence, KS (rivalry)	FSN	W 52–21	52,230
November 8	1:30 p.m.	at Nebraska		Memorial Stadium; Lincoln, NE (rivalry)	FSN PPV	L 35–45	85,486
November 15	11:30 a.m.	No. 4 Texas		Memorial Stadium; Lawrence, KS	FSN	L 7–35	51,930
November 29	11:30 a.m.	vs. No. 12 Missouri		Arrowhead Stadium; Kansas City, MO (Border War)	FSN	W 40–37	79,123
December 31	5:00 p.m.	vs. Minnesota*		Sun Devil Stadium; Tempe, AZ (Insight Bowl)	NFLN	W 42–21	49,103
*Non-conference game; ^{†}Homecoming; Rankings from AP Poll released prior to the game; All times are in Central time

Following the, season the NCAA ranked the Jayhawks schedule as the seventh toughest in NCAA Division I FBS, out of 119.

== Roster ==
KU dismissed junior cornerback Anthony Webb in June for violating team rules. At the same time, senior defensive tackle Todd Haselhorst left the team for health reasons. KU lost three running backs in August. Carmon Boyd-Anderson transferred to Southwest Baptist University. Donte Bean and Kyle Winkley left the team for Washburn University. Sean Ransburg did not qualify academically for the fall. Kicker Stephen Hoge quit the team in mid-August. Tight end and defensive end Kevin Glover left the team for personal issues.

2008 Kansas Jayhawks football roster
(starters in bold)
**Quarterbacks**: 5 **Todd Reesing** – Jr.; 17 Tyler Lawrence – (redshirt) So.; 19 Kale Pick – Fr.; **Running backs**: 1 **Jake Sharp** – Jr.; 3 Jocques Crawford – Jr.; 6 Rell Lewis – (redshirt) Fr.; 15 Sean Ransburg – Fr. (DNQ for fall); 22 Angus Quigley – (redshirt) Jr.; 23 Tyler Hunt; 31 Steven Foster – (redshirt) Fr.; **Wide receivers**: 2 Raymond Brown – (redshirt) Sr.; 4 Gary Green II – (redshirt) Sr.; 9 Raimond Pendleton – (redshirt) Jr.; 10 **Kerry Meier** – (redshirt) Jr.; 13 Marcus Herford – (redshirt) Sr.; 18 Xavier Rambo – (redshirt) So.; 19 Reece Petty – (redshirt) So.; 27 Willie O'Quinn – Fr.; 28 Daymond Patterson – Fr.; 30 Kyle Winkley – Fr.; 36 Jack Dowdell – Fr; 37 Micah Brown – (redshirt) Jr.; 80 **Dezmon Briscoe** -So.; 81 **Jonathan Wilson** – So.; 85 Rod Harris – So.; 88 **Dexton Fields** – (redshirt) Sr.; 89 Tertavian Ingram – (redshirt) So.; **Tight ends**: 11 A.J. Steward – (redshirt) Fr.; 43 Ted McNulty – (redshirt) Fr.; 42 Kevin Glover- (redshirt) So.; 82 Nick Plato – Fr.; 83 Tanner Hawkinson – Fr.; 86 **Tim Biere** – Fr.; 87 Bradley Dedeaux – (redshirt) So.	**Offensive line**: 50 **Ryan Cantrell** – (redshirt) Sr.; 55 Justin Pessetto – (redshirt) So.; 56 Kayl Anderson – (redshirt) Jr. (Long snapper); 59 Sal Capra – (redshirt) So.; 60 Jose Rodriguez – (redshirt) Jr.; 62 Alex Smith – (redshirt) So.; 63 Ian Wolfe – (redshirt) So.; 64 J.D. Hill – Fr.; 66 **Adrian Mayes** – (redshirt) Sr.; 67 Ben Leuken – Fr.; 68 Carl Wilson – (redshirt) So.; 69 Trevor Marrongelli – Fr.; 70 Matt Darton – (redshirt) Sr.; 71 John Williams – Fr.; 73 Joe Semple – Fr; 74 **Jeff Spikes** – (redshirt) Fr.; 75 Nathan D'Cunha – Jr.; 76 Brad Thorson – (redshirt) So. (TR); 77 **Jeremiah Hatch** – (redshirt) Fr.; 79 **Chet Hartley** – Sr.; **Defensive line**: 47 Maxwell Onyegbule – (redshirt) So.; 78 Gary Draper – Fr; 81 **Russell Brorsen** – Sr.; 84 **Jeff Wheeler** – (redshirt) Jr.; 87 John Larson – (redshirt) Sr.; 90 Richard Alspaugh – (redshirt) Sr.; 91 Jake Laptad – So.; 92 Patrick Dorsey – (redshirt) Fr.; 93 Darius Parish – Fr.; 94 **Caleb Blakesley** – (redshirt) Jr.; 95 D.J. Marshall – Fr.; 96 Dustin Spears – (redshirt) Jr.; 97 **Richard Johnson, Jr.** – (redshirt) Fr.; 98 Duane Zlatnik – Fr.; 99 Jamal Greene – (redshirt) So.	**Linebackers**: 8 **Joe Mortensen** – (redshirt) Sr.; 12 **James Holt** – Sr.; 38 Josh Richardson – Fr.; 40 **Mike Rivera** – (redshirt) Sr.; 41 Arist Wright – (redshirt) Jr.; 45 Justin Springer – So.; 49 Drew Dudley – So.; 51 Dakota Lewis – (redshirt) So.; 52 Steven Johnson – Fr.; 53 Chris Heinz – (redshirt) Fr.; 55 Nathan Sydney; 56 Corwin Hicks – Fr.; 57 Chea Peterman – (redshirt) Fr.; 58 Jake Schermer – (redshirt) Jr.; 61 Jordan Fee – Fr.; **Cornerbacks**: 16 **Chris Harris** – So.; 20 Taylor Lee – Fr.; 23 Ryan Murphy – (redshirt) Fr.; 24 **Kendrick Harper** – Sr.; 27 Greg Brown – Fr.; 29 Isiah Barfield – (redshirt) Fr.; 30 Anthony Davis – (redshirt) Fr.; 35 Corrigan Powell – Fr.; **Safeties**: 7 Patrick Resby – Sr.; 25 **Darrell Stuckey** – (redshirt) Jr.; 26 Phillip Strozier – (redshirt) So.; 28 Eric Tyler – (redshirt) Fr.; 36 Tang Bacheyie – (redshirt) Sr.; 39 Lubbock Smith – Fr.; 44 Olaitan Oguntodu – (redshirt) So.; 46 **Justin Thornton** – (redshirt) Jr.; **Punters**: 18 **Alonso Rojas** – So.; 22 Kyle Davis – (redshirt) Jr.; **Kickers**: 14 **Jacob Branstetter** – (redshirt) Fr.; 33 Grady Fowler – Jr.

== Coaching staff ==
2008 coaching staff
Front Office & Head coaches: Head coach – Mark Mangino; Director of football operations – George Matsakis; Associate director of football operations – MaryKay Ulrich; On-Campus Recruiting Coordinator – Rajeeb Hossain; Director of sports medicine/head football trainer – Murphy Grant; Head team physician – Dr. Larry Magee; Offensive coaches: Offensive coordinator/quarterbacks – Ed Warinner; Wide receivers – David Beaty; Recruiting coordinator/tight ends – Brandon Blaney; Offensive line/run game coordinator – John Reagan; Offensive graduate assistant – Tommy Mangino	Defensive coaches: Defensive coordinator/safeties – Clint Bowen; Defensive line – Joe Bob Clements; Linebackers – Steve Tovar; Cornerbacks – Je'Ney Jackson; Defensive graduate assistant – Joseph Fowler; Special teams coaches: Running backs/special teams coordinator – Louie Matsakis; Strength and conditioning: Strength and conditioning – Chris Dawson; Equipment supervisor – Jeff Himes

== Game summaries ==
=== Florida International ===
Florida International vs. #14 Kansas [box score]

Team	1	2	3	4	Total
Florida International	0	10	0	0	10
• #14 Kansas	7	23	10	0	40

- Date: August 30, 2008
- Location: Memorial Stadium, Lawrence, Kansas
- Game start: 6:00 p.m. CST
- Game attendance: 52,112

The largest crowd in Memorial Stadium history (52,112) witnessed Kansas' first victory of the 2008 season. Kansas quarterback Todd Reesing set career highs for passes attempted (52) and passes completed (37). Wide receiver Kerry Meier led Kansas with 9 receptions for 62 yards, and Dezmon Briscoe led Kansas with 3 touchdown receptions. Freshmen Punt Returner Daymond Patterson made an explosive debut with Kansas by returning a punt 75 yards for a touchdown in the second quarter. Despite the success of the passing game, Kansas struggled to run the ball, with primary running backs Jake Sharp and Jocques Crawford being held to 29 and 32 yards respectively.

=== Louisiana Tech ===
Louisiana Tech vs. #14 Kansas [box score]

Team	1	2	3	4	Total
Louisiana Tech	0	0	0	0	0
• #14 Kansas	3	10	16	0	29

- Date: September 6, 2008
- Location: Memorial Stadium, Lawrence, Kansas
- Game start: 6:00 p.m.
- Game attendance: 48,621
- TV announcers (FSN): Bill Land (Play-by-play), Gary Reasons (Color), & Emily Jones (Sideline)

Reesing continued his record-breaking ways from the previous week, throwing for a personal best 412 yards, after completing 32 passes on 38 attempts and 3 touchdowns. The running game again struggled as the Jayhawks rushed for 128 yards, but did not break the 100 yard mark until the 4th quarter. Junior running back Angus Quigley played most of the snaps in the second half, and led the Jayhawks with 84 yards. The defense played well, making several key plays and holding Louisiana Tech to no points. Key defensive plays included an interception in the end-zone by Chris Harris and safety Darrell Stuckey chasing down and tackling a Louisiana Tech player on a long break-away run, to prevent him from scoring a touchdown.

=== South Florida ===
#13 Kansas vs. #19 South Florida [box score]

Team	1	2	3	4	Total
#13 Kansas	10	10	0	14	34
• #19 South Florida	0	10	17	10	37

- Date: September 12, 2008
- Location: Raymond James Stadium, Tampa, Florida
- Game start: 8:00 p.m.
- TV announcers (ESPN2): Sean McDonough (Play-by-play), Chris Spielman (Color), & Rob Stone (Sideline)

=== Sam Houston State ===
Sam Houston State vs. #19 Kansas [box score]

Team	1	2	3	4	Total
Sam Houston State	0	7	7	0	14
• #19 Kansas	0	21	10	7	38

- Date: September 20, 2008
- Location: Memorial Stadium, Lawrence, Kansas
- Game start: 6:00 p.m.
- Game attendance: 51,767
- TV announcers (FCS): Dan McLaughlin (Play-by-play) & Rich Baldinger (Color)

Heading into the game against Sam Houston State, Kansas was ranked #19 in the AP Poll. This made the 14th consecutive week that Kansas was ranked in the Top 25 (dating back to 2007), a school record. Angus Quigley made his first start at running back for Kansas, rushing 16 times for 61 yards and a touchdown. Crawford had his best rushing game of the season thus far, rushing for 43 yards on 13 attempts and a touchdown. Kerry Meier led Kansas in receiving with 8 receptions for 136 yards and a touchdown. After four weeks of play, Meier leads Division 1 in receptions for a wide-receiver. Reesing passed for 356 yards and two touchdowns as Kansas continued to emphasize the passing game. Reesing made several impressive scramble plays, one of these scrambles resulted in a 68-yard touchdown pass to Kerry Meier. Reesing in this game set the Kansas all-time record in touchdown passes with 47.

=== Iowa State ===
#16 Kansas vs. Iowa State [box score]

Team	1	2	3	4	Total
• #16 Kansas	0	0	21	14	35
Iowa State	14	6	0	13	33

- Date: October 4, 2008
- Location: Jack Trice Stadium, Ames, Iowa
- Game start: 11:30 a.m.
- Game attendance: 47,847
- TV announcers (Versus): Ron Thulin (play-by-play) & Dale Hellestrae (color)

Heading into the game against Iowa State, Kansas was ranked #16 in the AP Poll. This made the 16th consecutive week that Kansas was ranked in the Top 25 (dating back to 2007), a school record. Coming off a bye-week, Kansas entered the game 17 point favorites. However, Iowa State started the game with a flawless performance. Iowa State Quarterback Austen Arnaud started the game with six straight completions and a touchdown as Iowa State took an early 14 to 0 lead. Iowa State then added two field goals in the second quarter to go up 20 to 0 at halftime. Kansas started the second half well when running back Jake Sharp caught at 67-yard touchdown pass from Todd Reesing. Kansas scored again with an Angus Quigley touchdown run that cut Iowa State's lead to six. On Kansas' next possession they found themselves with a 4th and 6 on the Iowa State 23-yard line. Kansas decided to go for it and Kerry Meier caught a touchdown on the play as Kansas took its first lead 21 to 20. In the 4th Quarter Dexton Fields caught a 50-yard pass, but Todd Reesing fumbled it on the next play. Arnaud then threw an interception and Kansas capitalized with a Jake Sharp touchdown run to go up 28 to 20. After Iowa State scored its first touchdown of the second half, Kansas responded when Kerry Meier caught a 21-yard touchdown to put Kansas up 35 to 26. Arnaud led Iowa State to another touchdown to cut the lead to 35 to 33 with 1 minute 15 seconds left in the game. Iowa State then recovered an onside kick, but failed to advance the ball. Kansas' victory was the third largest comeback win in school history. Reesing finished with 319 yards, three touchdowns and one interception. Kerry Meier led Kansas in receiving again with 7 receptions for 125 yards and two touchdowns. Jake Sharp had his best performance of the season with 79 yards rushing, 109 yards receiving and two touchdowns.

=== Colorado ===
Colorado vs. #16 Kansas [box score]

Team	1	2	3	4	Total
Colorado	7	0	7	0	14
• #16 Kansas	0	9	7	14	30

- Date: October 11, 2008
- Location: Memorial Stadium, Lawrence, Kansas
- Game start: 11:30 a.m.
- Game attendance: 49,566
- TV announcers (ESPN2): Joe Tessitore (Play-by-play) & Rod Gilmore (Color)

Heading into the game against Colorado, Kansas was ranked #15 in the Coaches Poll. This made the 17th consecutive week that Kansas was ranked in the Top 25 (dating back to 2007), a school record. Before the start of the game Kansas Coach Mark Mangino asked the KU student section to refrain from an expletive kickoff chant that has become a student tradition. Despite Mangino's plea, the student section yelled the chant louder than ever. Colorado scored first with an 11-yard Cody Hawkins touchdown pass. Colorado got the ball back soon thereafter, but Hawkins threw an interception inside the red zone and the Kansas defense prevented another Colorado score. Kansas first got on the board with a Jake Sharp touchdown run in the 2nd Quarter. On Colorado's next possession, Hawkins was sacked for a 17-yard loss and a safety to give Kansas its first lead. Once again Kansas came out and played much better in the second half. In the second half Todd Reesing passed for his only touchdown to Dezmon Briscoe and Sharp rushed for two more touchdowns. Sharp's first start of the season was successful as he rushed for 118 yards on 31 carries and for 3 touchdowns. Sharp's performance was by far the best of any Kansas running back through the first 6 games of the season. Reesing had his most accurate game of the season, completing 27 of 34 passes for 256 yards and 1 touchdown. Wide receiver Kerry Meier had 9 receptions for 94 yards. A few hours after the Kansas win, the only other undefeated North team in Big 12 play, Missouri, lost to Oklahoma State. Kansas stood atop the Big 12 North with a record of 2–0.

=== Oklahoma ===
#16 Kansas vs. #4 Oklahoma [box score]

Team	1	2	3	4	Total
#16 Kansas	7	10	7	7	31
• #4 Oklahoma	7	17	14	7	45

- Date: October 18, 2008
- Location: Gaylord Family Oklahoma Memorial Stadium, Norman, Oklahoma
- Game start: 2:30 p.m. CST
- Game attendance: 85,241
- Game weather: 71°, Sunny
- TV announcers (ABC): Ron Franklin (Play-by-play), Ed Cunningham (Color), & Jack Arute (Sideline)

Heading into the game against Oklahoma, Kansas was ranked #15 in the Coaches Poll. This made the 18th consecutive week that Kansas was ranked in the Top 25 (dating back to 2007), a school record. Kansas managed to keep the game close throughout the first half. However, a Reesing interception in the endzone and a missed field goal prevented the Jayhawks from tying the game. Oklahoma dominated the second half as their Quarterback Sam Bradford had one of the most productive games of his career. He set an Oklahoma record with 468 yards passing. The Kansas defense was unable to stop the Oklahoma offense for much of the second half. Reesing ended the game passing for 342 yards on 21 completions with 2 touchdowns and 2 interceptions. Kansas wide-receiver Dezmon Briscoe had the best game of his career. Briscoe caught 12 passes for 269 yards and 2 touchdowns. Jake Sharp led Kansas in rushing with 103 yards on 12 attempts.

=== Texas Tech ===
#8 Texas Tech vs. #19 Kansas [box score]

Team	1	2	3	4	Total
• #8 Texas Tech	14	21	21	7	63
#19 Kansas	14	0	0	7	21

- Date: October 25, 2008
- Location: Memorial Stadium, Lawrence, Kansas
- Game start: 11:00 a.m. CST
- Game weather: 68°, Clear
- TV announcers (ESPN): Dave Pasch (Play-by-play), Andre Ware (Color), & Rob Stone (Sideline)

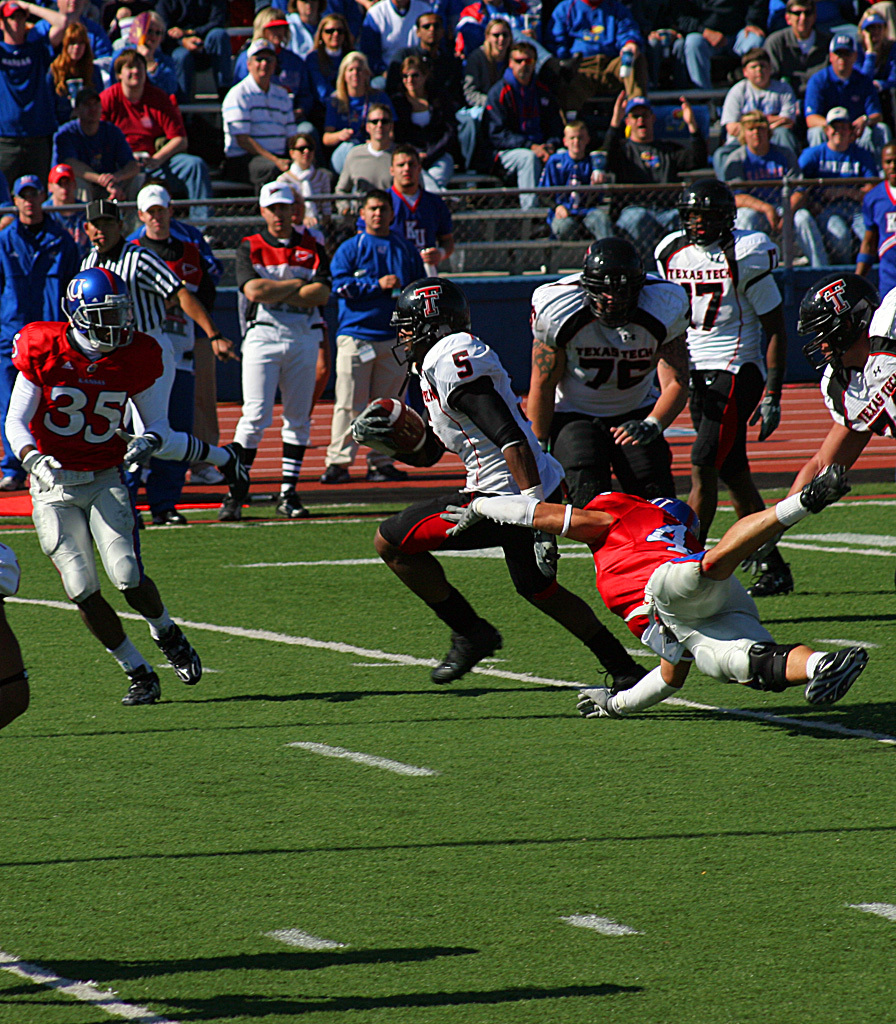
Kansas on defense against Texas Tech

Heading into the game against Texas Tech, Kansas was ranked #25 in the Coaches Poll. This made the 19th consecutive week that Kansas was ranked in the Top 25 (dating back to 2007), a school record. Texas Tech entered the game ranked 8th in the BCS, making them the highest ranked opposing team to enter Memorial Stadium since Texas in 2004. In the first quarter, both offenses showcased their reputations for scoring. The score was tied at 14 to 14 at the end of the first quarter. However, the rest of the game would be dominated by Texas Tech. The Kansas defense was unable to stop Texas Tech from scoring until into the 4th quarter. The 63 points given up by Kansas was the most any Kansas team had given up since 2002. Additionally, this was the worst loss at home for Kansas since 2002, and the worst loss in overall play since 2005. This game was also the first loss at Memorial Stadium for Kansas since 2006. Kansas' winning streak of 13 games at home came to an end. Reesing had one of his worst performances of his career, passing for only 154 yards on 16 completions with 2 touchdowns and 3 interceptions. Jake Sharp led the team with 80 yards rushing on 13 attempts and Kerry Meier led with 6 receptions for 70 yards and 1 touchdown.

=== Kansas State ===
Kansas State vs. Kansas [box score]

Team	1	2	3	4	Total
Kansas State	0	0	7	14	21
• Kansas	21	10	14	7	52

- Date: November 1, 2008
- Location: Memorial Stadium, Lawrence, Kansas
- Game attendance: 52,230
- TV announcers (FSN): Drew Goodman (Play-by-play), Dave Lapham (Color), & Jim Knox (Sideline)

Heading into the game against Kansas State; Kansas was unranked in any major poll for the first time since September 30, 2007. A new Memorial Stadium record crowd of 52,230, which had been set already earlier in the season, watched the Jayhawks defeat the Wildcats and increase their lead in the all-time Sunflower Showdown results to 64–37–5. The 52 points scored by Kansas was the second most that the team has ever scored against Kansas State (55 points in 1947 being the highest).

=== Nebraska ===
Kansas vs. Nebraska [box score]

Team	1	2	3	4	Total
Kansas	7	7	7	14	35
• Nebraska	7	7	10	21	45

- Date: November 8, 2008
- Location: Memorial Stadium, Lincoln, Nebraska
- TV announcers (FSN PPV): Dan McLaughlin (Play-by-play), Matt Davison (Color), & Stacy Paetz (Sideline)

=== Texas ===
#4 Texas vs. Kansas [box score]

Team	1	2	3	4	Total
• #4 Texas	7	7	21	0	35
Kansas	0	0	7	0	7

- Date: November 15, 2008
- Location: Memorial Stadium, Lawrence, Kansas
- Game start: 11:30 a.m. CST
- Game weather: 37 °F (3 °C) and partly cloudy, with winds of 23–30 miles per hour. Light snow flurries.
- TV announcers (FSN): Dan McLaughlin (Play-by-play), Dave Lapham (Color), & Jim Knox (Sideline)

Coming into 2008, Kansas held a 0–6 record against Texas since the formation of the Big12 Conference. In order to win the 2004 game against the Kansas Jayhawks, Texas had to convert a 4th-and-18 situation and complete a touchdown pass with only eleven seconds remaining on the clock. The 2005 game provided much less on-field drama, as Texas led 52–0 by halftime and defeated Kansas 66–14. The two teams did not face each other in 2006 or 2007.

The morning of the 2008 game, Las Vegas casinos favored Texas by 14 points. The weather at kickoff was 37 °F (3 °C) and partly cloudy, with winds of 23–30 miles per hour. Snow flurries began near the end of the first half.

Texas won the 2008 game, 35–7. UT's Colt McCoy completed 24 of 35 passing attempts (71%) for 255 yards and 2 touchdown passes. He was also the leading rusher for both schools, rushing for 78 yards and a touchdown. Todd Reesing, an Austin native, completed 25 of 50 passes for 258 yards and 1 touchdown.

=== Missouri ===
Kansas vs. #12 Missouri [box score]

Team	1	2	3	4	Total
• Kansas	3	16	7	14	40
#12 Missouri	0	10	13	14	37

- Date: November 29, 2008
- Location: Arrowhead Stadium, Kansas City, Missouri
- Game start: 11:30 a.m. CST
- Game attendance: 79,123
- TV announcers (FSN): Bill Land (Play-by-play), Dave Lapham (Color), & Jim Knox (Sideline)

Played in alternating snow and light rain, Kansas claimed a victory over Missouri in thrilling fashion. Kansas scored first, taking advantage of an early Darrell Stuckey interception, and Darrell Stuckey's forced fumble on a long Chase Daniel run. Missouri came back in the second half, pulling into the lead late in the game on a Derrick Washington touchdown run. But Kansas marched down the field quickly, scoring when Todd Reesing eluded defensive pressure and lofted a pass to Kerry Meier as Meier ran across the goal line. Missouri raced downfield just as quickly, but a last-second field goal was blocked to preserve a 40–37 win for Kansas. This was the last victory over a team ranked in the AP poll for the Jayhawks until Nov. 5th 2022 against #18 ranked Oklahoma State.

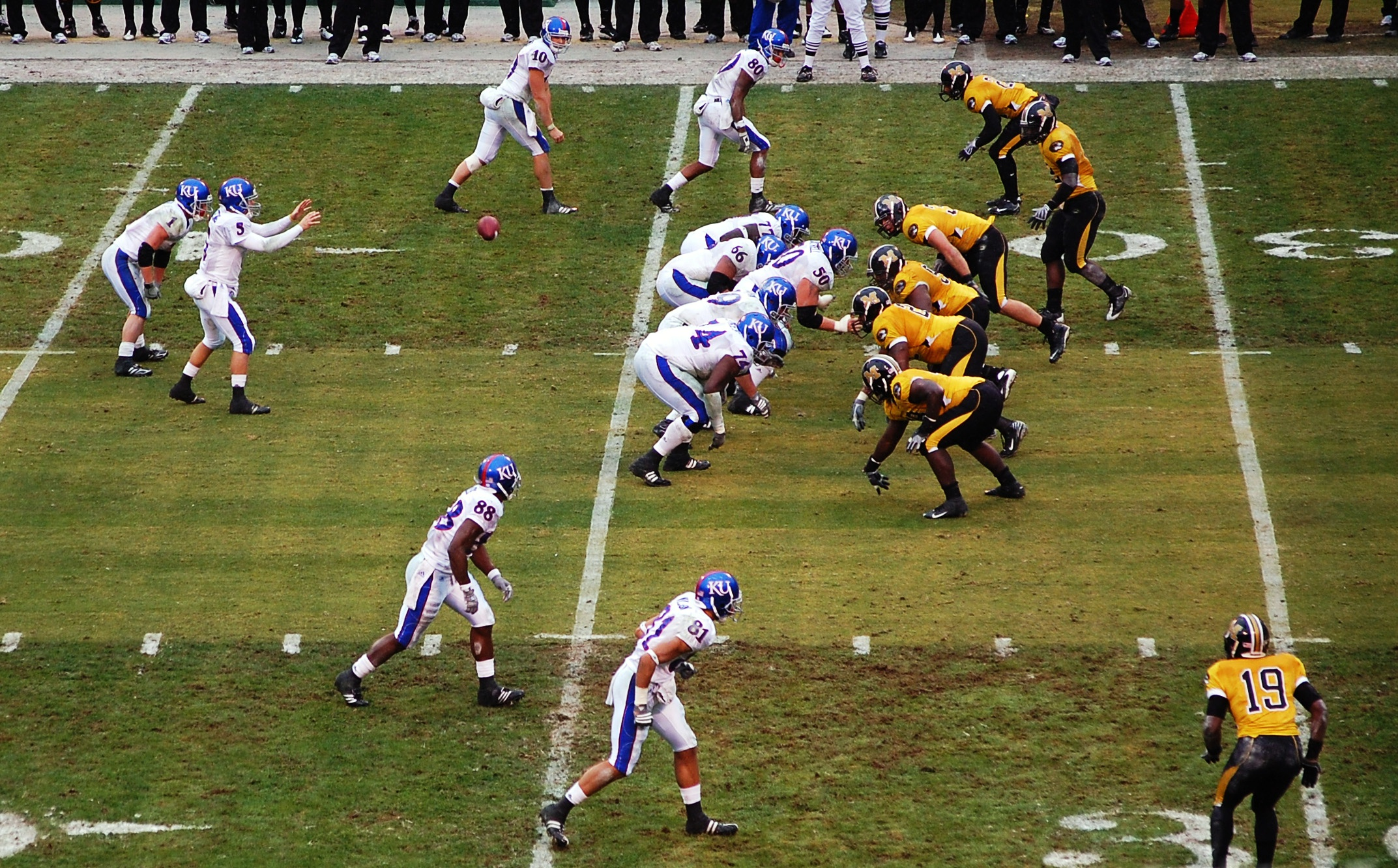
KU on offense

=== Minnesota (Insight Bowl) ===
Kansas vs. Minnesota [box score]

Team	1	2	3	4	Total
• Kansas	14	14	7	7	42
Minnesota	14	0	0	7	21

- Date: December 31, 2008
- Location: Sun Devil Stadium, Tempe, Arizona
- Game start: 5:00 p.m. CST
- TV announcers (NFLN/SportsUSA Radio): Paul Burmeister (Play-by-play), Mike Mayock (Color), & Lindsay Soto (Sideline)/Eli Gold (Play-by-play), John Robinson (Color), & Tony Graziani (Sideline)

Both teams started quickly on offense. Todd Reesing threw a touchdown pass to Dezmon Briscoe on KU's first play from scrimmage. The first quarter ended 14–14. But Kansas kept scoring, leading 28–14 at the half, and 35–14 at the start of the 4th quarter. Briscoe caught 14 passes for 201 yards and three touchdowns. Todd Reesing threw four TD passes. Wide receiver Kerry Meier caught a touchdown and threw for another. Kansas won 42–21, making it three straight bowl wins and their first time appearing in bowls back-to-back seasons.

== Rankings ==
Ranking movements Legend: ██ Increase in ranking ██ Decrease in ranking — = Not ranked RV = Received votes
	Week																
Poll	Pre	1	2	3	4	5	6	7	8	9	10	11	12	13	14	15	Final
AP	14	14	13	19	18	16	16	16	19	RV	RV	RV	—	—	—	—	RV
Coaches	13	12	11	19	18	16	15	15	18	RV	RV	RV	—	—	RV	RV	RV
Harris	Not released					17	16	16	19	RV	RV	RV	—	—	RV	RV	Not released
BCS	Not released								23	—	—	—	—	—	—	—	Not released

== Statistics ==
2008 Official Statistics

=== Team ===
	Team	Opp
Scoring	434	387
Points per game	33.38	29.77
First downs	301	277
Rushing	111	91
Passing	172	168
Penalty	18	18
Total offense	5621	5157
Avg per play	5.9	5.6
Avg per game	432.4	396.7
Fumbles-Lost	21-9	22-10
Penalties-Yards	62-576	75-589
Avg per game		

	Team	Opp
Punts-Yards	58-	57-
Avg per punt	40.7	39.8
Time of possession/Game	37:49	22:11
3rd down conversions	93/184	74/183
4th down conversions	8/16	12/26
Touchdowns scored		
Field goals-Attempts-Long	11-14-47	
PAT-Attempts		
Attendance		
Games/Avg per Game		

==== Scores by quarter ====
	1	2	3	4	Total
Kansas	86	130	113	105	434
Opponents	70	95	120	93	378

=== Offense ===
==== Rushing ====
Name	GP	Att	Gain	Loss	Net	Avg	TD	Long	Avg/G
Sharp, Jake	13-10	186	888	28	860	4.6	12	47	66.2
Quigley, Angus	11-2	59	312	3	309	5.2	3	20	28.1
Crawford, Jocques	13-0	62	262	30	232	3.7	4	20	17.8
Reesing, Todd	13-13	126	489	265	224	1.8	4	18	17.2
Briscoe, Dezmon	13-11	2	18	0	18	9.0	0	13	1.4
Lawrence, Tyler	3-0	2	17	0	17	8.5	0	11	5.7
Wilson, Johnathan	13-12	1	0	0	0	0.0	0	0	0.0
Meier, Kerry	13-11	2	2	7	-5	-2.5	0	2	-0.4
TEAM	4-0	5	0	7	-7	-1.4	0	0	-1.8
Total	13	445	1,988	340	1,648	3.7	23	47	126.8
Opponents	13	406	1,905	305	1,600	3.9	22	78	123.1

==== Passing ====
Name	GP-GS	Effic	Cmp-Att-Int	Pct	Yds	TD	Lng	Avg/G
Reesing, Todd	13-13	148.52	329-495-13	66.5	3,888	32	69	299.1
Meier, Kerry	13-11	417.20	3-3-0	100.0	74	1	32	5.7
Lawrence, Tyler	3-0	96.20	1-2-0	50.0	11	0	11	3.7
Total	13	149.93	333-500-13	66.6	3,973	33	69	305.6
Opponents	13	129.73	318-521-15	61.0	3,557	27	75	273.6

==== Receiving ====
Name	GP	No.	Yds	Avg	TD	Long	Avg/G
Meier, Kerry	13-11	97	1,045	10.8	8	68	80.4
Briscoe, Dezmon	13-11	92	1,407	15.3	15	69	108.2
Wilson, Johnathan	13-12	43	573	13.3	3	56	44.1
Sharp, Jake	13-10	25	283	11.3	1	67	21.8
Fields, Dexton	11-11	20	214	10.7	3	50	19.5
Quigley, Angus	11-2	17	82	4.8	1	14	7.5
Patterson, Daymond	13-5	14	154	11.0	2	44	11.8
Biere, Tim	12-2	6	65	10.8	0	23	5.4
Crawford, Jocques	13-0	6	46	7.7	0	29	3.5
Brown, Raymond	13-1	5	29	5.8	0	11	2.2
Pendleton, Raimond	6-1	4	29	7.2	0	13	4.8
Dedeaux, Bradley	9-2	2	9	4.5	0	5	1.0
Herford, Marcus	11-0	1	31	31.0	0	31	2.8
Steward, A.J.	10-0	1	6	6.0	0	6	0.6
Glover, Kevin	10-1	1	81.1	81.1	0	0	81.1
Total	13	333	3,973	11.9	33	69	305.6
Opponents	13	318	3,557	11.2	27	75	273.6
