= Riding High (New Zealand TV series) =

New Zealand TV series

- Genre: Teen; Drama; Romance
- Written by: Peter Allison; Kirsty Cooper; Karen Curtis; Alannah O'Sullivan; Liddy Holloway; Dianna Drake; Doug Coutts; Brenda Kendall; Libby Magee; Ben Marshall; Jan Prettejohns; Gavin Strawhan; Alan Brash
- Directed by: Grant Fenn; Laurence Wilson; Dave Morgan; Simon Bennett
- Starring: Marama Jackson; Natalie Dennis; Rebecca Jane Clark; Chris Widdup; Paul Gittins; Jean Hyland; John Cairney; Kerry Gallagher; Karl Urban; Joe Conway; Peter Muller; Madeleine Lynch; Kieren Hutchison; June Bishop; Charlotte Saunders; Geoffrey Dolan; Alistair Browning; Tim Lee; Matt Davison
- Theme music composer: Peter Blake
- Country of origin: New Zealand
- Original language: English
- No. of seasons: 1
- No. of episodes: 65

Production
- Producer: Richard A. Barker
- Production location: New Zealand
- Running time: 25 minutes
- Production company: South Pacific Pictures

Original release
- Network: TV2
- Release: 31 December 1995 – 27 June 1996

Riding High is a television series from New Zealand. The series is based on the comics of the German Wendy magazine.

== Plot ==
The 15 year old Wendy Thorburn lives on the Lindentree horse farm. She takes care of the horses and has a lot of adventures with her friends.

== Overview ==
Riding High is based on the comics of the German Wendy magazine. The series was filmed in New Zealand and premiered on television on December 31, 1995 on TV2. The series was distributed worldwide by HIT Entertainment.

The series was translated into German and Italian. From 1996 to 1998 the German Franz Schneider publisher published nine books based on the television series.

Riding High is not the only TV series based on the Wendy comics. A second series, Wendy, based on the comics, was published in 2013. It is an animated series.

== Cast ==
Character	actor/actress	notes
Wendy Thorburn	Marama Jackson	Wendy is a 15-year-old girl who lives on the horse farm Lindentree. She has two horses Penny and Miss Dixie.
Bianca Frazer	Natalie Dennis	Bianca is Wendys best friend. She is the adopted child of the police officer Paul Frazer and Jeannette.
Vanessa Wilde	Tyler-Jane Mitchel (as Rebecca Jane Clark)	Vanessa is Wendys cousin. She is interested in beauty and clothes.
Flavio Scalini	Chris Widdup	Flavio works at the stables of the horse farm. He is secretly in love with Vanessa.
Charles Thorburn	Paul Gittins	Charles is the father of Wendy. He owns the horse Onyx.
Helen Thorburn	Jean Hyland	Helen is Wendy's mother.
Harry	John Cairney	Harry is the neighbour of Wendys family. He is interested in naturopathy.
Ingrid Wilde	Kerry Gallagher	Ingrid is the mother of Vanessa and Wendys aunt. She owns a beauty farm.
James Westwood	Karl Urban	James is Wendy's and Vanessa's love interest.
Mark Benson	Joe Conway	Mark is a riding instructor at Lindentree. He is fancied by a lot of girls.
Michael McKenzie	Peter Muller	Michael becomes a riding instructor when Mark leaves Lindentree.
Cathy	Madeleine Lynch	Cathy is a riding instructor at Lindentree.
Steven Brighton	Kieren Hutchison	Steven is Wendy's first boyfriend.
Alice Thorburn	June Bishop	Alice is Wendy's grandmother.
Alexa Thorburn	Charlotte Saunders	Alexa is Wendy's sister who studies fashion design.
Paul Frazer	Geoffrey Dolan	Paul is Bianca's adoptive father and a police officer. He also has a son, Peter.
Max	Alistair Browning	Max is the love interest of Ingrid.
William Westwood	Tim Lee	William Westwood is Gunnars friend and enemy. He had an affair with Helen, before Helen and Gunnar got married. He is the father of James.
Casey Rainer	Matt Davison	Casey is a successful tournament rider.

== Reception ==
Riding High was well received by viewers in Germany. The series was still repeated on German television years after it was first broadcast.

Antje Wessels praises the luxurious landscape shots and exciting scenes from the everyday life with the horses. However, the series is orientated more towards older children and teenagers. Therefore, it is less suitable for the very young viewers and more for the whole family. The series covers topics such as horses, friendship, love and growing up.

Lisa Ludwig from Moviepilot adds that Riding High is the perfect mixture of a daily soap, Gossip Girl, 90s nostalgia and riding stable romance. She also praises Karl Urban's performance as Jerry Kiesemann (James Westwood).

Lorella Joschko thinks the series has depth and at the same time lots of fun and joy. The series is her absolute highlight.

Julia Fahl thinks that the Wendy series is a must see for horse fans. As a teenager she was particularly fascinated by the horse Miss Dixie.

== See also ==
- Wendy (2013), another TV series based on the Wendy magazine
