= 2008 Nebraska Cornhuskers football team =

American college football season

2008 Nebraska Cornhuskers football

Big 12 North Division co-champion Gator Bowl champion

Gator Bowl, W 26–21 vs. Clemson
- Conference: Big 12 Conference
- North Division
- Record: 9–4 (5–3 Big 12)
- Head coach: Bo Pelini (1st season)
- Offensive coordinator: Shawn Watson (2nd season)
- Offensive scheme: Spread
- Defensive coordinator: Carl Pelini (1st season)
- Base defense: 4–2
- Home stadium: Memorial Stadium

2008 Big 12 Conference football standings
	Conf.			Overall
Team	W		L	W		L
North Division
No. 19 Missouri xy	5	–	3	10	–	4
Nebraska x	5	–	3	9	–	4
Kansas	4	–	4	8	–	5
Colorado	2	–	6	5	–	7
Kansas State	2	–	6	5	–	7
Iowa State	0	–	8	2	–	10
South Division
No. 5 Oklahoma xy$	7	–	1	12	–	2
No. 4 Texas x%	7	–	1	12	–	1
No. 12 Texas Tech x	7	–	1	11	–	2
No. 16 Oklahoma State	5	–	3	9	–	4
Baylor	2	–	6	4	–	8
Texas A&M	2	–	6	4	–	8
Championship: Oklahoma 62, Missouri 21
$ – BCS representative as conference champion; % – BCS at-large representative; x – Division champion/co-champions; y – Championship game participant; Rankings from AP Poll

The 2008 Nebraska Cornhuskers football team represented the University of Nebraska–Lincoln in the 2008 NCAA Division I FBS football season. The team was coached by Bo Pelini and played their home games at Memorial Stadium in Lincoln, Nebraska.

== Before the season ==
Pelini returned to Nebraska as head coach after a previous one-year stint as defensive coordinator for Nebraska in 2003. At the conclusion of the 2003 season, Pelini was appointed as interim head coach, following the firing of Frank Solich, for Nebraska's appearance in the Alamo Bowl against the Michigan State Spartans, a contest in which Nebraska triumphed 17–3, leaving Nebraska with a final AP Poll ranking of 19 and Coaches Poll ranking of 18. Despite this performance and significant fan support, Pelini was passed over as Solich's permanent replacement in favor of Bill Callahan. During Pelini's absence from Nebraska, he served as co-defensive coordinator for the Oklahoma Sooners in 2004, and Defensive Coordinator for the LSU Tigers for 2005–2007 prior to his return to Nebraska following the dismissal of Callahan.

== Schedule ==
Date	Time	Opponent	Site	TV	Result	Attendance
August 30	6:00 pm	Western Michigan*	Memorial Stadium; Lincoln, Nebraska	FSN PPV	W 47–24	84,485
September 6	11:30 am	San José State*	Memorial Stadium; Lincoln, Nebraska	FSN PPV	W 35–12	84,146
September 13	6:00 pm	New Mexico State*	Memorial Stadium; Lincoln, Nebraska	FSN PPV	W 38–7	84,821
September 27	7:00 pm	Virginia Tech*	Memorial Stadium; Lincoln, Nebraska	ABC	L 30–35	85,831
October 4	8:00 pm	No. 4 Missouri^{†}	Memorial Stadium; Lincoln, Nebraska (rivalry)	ESPN	L 17–52	85,372
October 11	2:00 pm	at No. 7 Texas Tech	Jones AT&T Stadium; Lubbock, Texas	FSN	L 31–37 ^{OT}	53,449
October 18	11:30 am	at Iowa State	Jack Trice Stadium; Ames, Iowa (rivalry)	Versus	W 35–7	48,794
October 25	11:30 am	Baylor	Memorial Stadium; Lincoln, Nebraska	Versus	W 32–20	85,104
November 1	7:00 pm	at No. 4 Oklahoma	Gaylord Family Oklahoma Memorial Stadium; Norman, Oklahoma (rivalry)	ESPN	L 28–62	85,212
November 8	1:30 pm	Kansas	Memorial Stadium; Lincoln, Nebraska (rivalry)	FSN PPV	W 45–35	85,486
November 15	2:35 pm	at Kansas State	Bill Snyder Family Football Stadium; Manhattan, Kansas (rivalry)	FSN PPV	W 56–28	48,444
November 28	2:30 pm	Colorado	Memorial Stadium; Lincoln, Nebraska (rivalry)	ABC	W 40–31	85,319
January 1, 2009	12:00 pm	vs. Clemson*	Jacksonville Municipal Stadium; Jacksonville, Florida (Gator Bowl)	CBS	W 26–21	67,282
*Non-conference game; ^{†}Homecoming; Rankings from AP Poll released prior to the game; All times are in Central time

== Roster and coaching staff ==
2008 Nebraska Cornhuskers football team roster
Players
Coaches
Offense

Pos.	#	Name	Class
OL	66	Cruz Barrett	So
TE	83	Damon Bechtold	Fr
WR	1	Chris Brooks	Jr
OL	72	Jaivorio Burkes	So
WR	82	Wes Cammack	Jr
OL	58	Mike Caputo	RFr
IB	19	Quentin Castille	So
OL	77	Seung Hoon Choi	Fr
OL	62	Andy Christensen	Sr
WR	6	Khiry Cooper	Fr
TE	81	Ben Cotton	Fr
QB	15	Beau Davis	Sr
WR	46	Taylor Dixon	Fr
QB	16	Jim Ebke	So
QB	12	Joe Ganz (C)	Sr
FB	41	Aaron Gillaspie	So
WR	11	Curenski Gilleylen	RFr
FB	30	Mike Hays	RFr
IB	10	Roy Helu Jr.	So
OL	74	Ricky Henry	Jr
WR	8	Will Henry	So
TE	47	Tyson Hetzer	Jr
OL	67	Jacob Hickman	Jr
TE	80	Ryan Hill	RFr
WR	18	Menelik Holt	Jr
OL	61	Mike Huff	Sr
WR	85	KC Hyland	Fr
OL	69	Cory Iske	Fr
IB	28	Austin Jones	RFr
OL	73	D.J. Jones	So
OL	78	Marcel Jones	RFr
FB	36	Thomas Lawson	Sr
QB	3	Zac Lee	So
FB	48	Tyler Legate	RFr
WR	9	Ben Lester	RFr
IB	5	Marlon Lucky	Sr
WR	21	Tim Marlowe	Fr
TE	88	Jay Martin	RFr
OL	71	Mike Masin	RFr
TE	44	Mike McNeill	So
OL	54	Max McShane	Fr
IB	32	Marcus Mendoza	RFr
OL	63	Derek Meyer	Sr
OL	76	Lydon Murtha	Sr
IB	29	Collins Okafor	Fr
WR	26	Steven Osborne	Fr
WR	24	Niles Paul	So
WR	17	Todd Peterson	Sr
TE	25	Kyler Reed	Fr
QB	18	Zach Ruiz	Fr
OL	70	Matt Slauson	Sr
OL	65	Mike Smith	So
QB	7	Kody Spano	Fr
WR	87	Nate Swift (C)	Sr
TE	89	Hunter Teafatiller	Sr
OL	79	Brandon Thompson	Fr
FB	37	Kevin Thomsen	RFr
OL	59	Brian Thorson	Fr
RB	25	Jeremy Wallace	Fr
IB	14	Lester Ward	Fr
OL	68	Keith Williams	So
QB	2	Patrick Witt	RFr
TE	49	Dreu Young	So

Defense

Pos.	#	Name	Class
DE	95	Pierre Allen	So
CB	21	Prince Amukamara	So
DE	70	Kenny Anderson	Fr
S	4	Larry Asante	Jr
DT	56	Shukree Barfield	Sr
DB	39	Justin Blatchford	Fr
CB	14	Anthony Blue	So
LB	42	Joseph Camarata	Fr
S	8	Austin Cassidy	RFr
LB	51	Will Compton	Fr
DE	31	Nick Covey	Jr
DT	94	Jared Crick	RFr
S	2	Major Culbert	Jr
DB	20	Jase Dean	Fr
DB	15	Alfonzo Dennard	Fr
LB	52	Phillip Dillard	Jr
DE	92	Tyrone Fahie	So
LB	42	Sean Fisher	Fr
LB	49	Tanner Foxhoven	Fr
DE	39	Dan Glassman	So
LB	34	Cody Glenn	Sr
LB	41	Thomas Grove	So
CB	28	Eric Hagg	So
DE	80	David Harvey	Jr
LB	35	Matt Holt	Fr
DL	58	Justin Jackson	Fr
DE	85	Faron Klingelhoefer	Fr
LB	54	Colton Koehler	Jr
LB	44	Micah Kreikemeier	Fr
LB	40	Blake Lawrence	So
DB	16	John Levorson	Fr
DE	75	Luke Lingenfelter	RFr
LB	61	Matt Manninger	Fr
DT	63	Ben Martin	So
S	36	Mathew May	RFr
LB	62	Mychael McClure	Fr
LB	65	Colin McDermott	Fr
DE	66	Conor McDermott	Fr
LB	67	Sam Meginnis	Fr
DE	96	Cameron Meredith	Fr
DL	68	Josh Molek	Fr
DT	90	Terrence Moore	RFr
FS	43	Brent Moravec	Fr
CB	6	Armando Murillo	Sr
S	33	Matt O'Hanlon	Jr
DB	12	Courtney Osborne	Fr
DE	98	Zach Potter (C)	Sr
DB	11	Justin Rogers	Fr
DE	89	Jonathon Santin	RFr
DE	88	Clayton Sievers	Sr
LB	48	Marcus Smith	Fr
DB	13	P.J. Smith	Fr
LB	9	Austin Stafford	RFr
DL	55	Baker Steinkuhler	Fr
DT	43	Ty Steinkuhler (C)	Sr
LB	71	Graham Stoddard	Fr
DT	93	Ndamukong Suh	Jr
CB	18	Shawn Sullivan	RFr
S	3	Rickey Thenarse	Jr
CB	23	Lance Thorell	RFr
DL	50	Quentin Toailoa	Fr
DE	99	Barry Turner	Sr
DB	22	Mason Wald	Fr
LB	7	Latravis Washington	So
S	24	Adam Watson	So
CB	5	Anthony West	So
LB	45	Alonzo Whaley	Fr
DE	17	Josh Williams	Fr
LB	53	Tyler Wortman	Sr
DE	47	William Yancy	RFr

Special teams

Pos.	#	Name	Class
LS	56	Justin Baumgartner	Sr
P/PK	27	Jon Damkroger	So
PK	90	Alex Henery	So
PK	20	Adi Kunalic	So
P/PK	96	Brett Maher	Fr
LS	82	T.J. O'Leary	Sr
LS	33	David Pillen	Fr
P	97	Dan Titchener	Sr
PK	37	Jake Wesch	Sr

Head coach

- Bo Pelini
  1st season
  2nd year at Nebraska
  Alma mater: Ohio State

Coordinators/assistant coaches

- Shawn Watson
  2nd season as OC/QB coach
  3rd year at Nebraska
  Alma mater: Southern Illinois
- Carl Pelini
  1st season as DC/DL coach
  1st year at Nebraska
  Alma mater: Youngstown State
- Tim Beck
  1st season as RB coach
  1st year at Nebraska
  Alma mater: Central Florida
- Ron Brown
  1st season as TE coach
  18th year at Nebraska
  Alma mater: Brown
- Barney Cotton
  1st season as AHC/OL coach
  2nd year at Nebraska
  Alma mater: Nebraska
- Mike Ekeler
  1st season as LB coach
  1st year at Nebraska
  Alma mater: Kansas State
- Ted Gilmore
  1st season as AHC/Rec coach
  4th year at Nebraska
  Alma mater: Wyoming
- John Papuchis
  1st season as DE/ST coach
  1st year at Nebraska
  Alma mater: Virginia Tech
- Marvin Sanders
  1st season as Sec coach
  2nd year at Nebraska
  Alma mater: Nebraska
- James Dobson
  1st season as S&C coach
  1st year at Nebraska
  Alma mater: Wisconsin
- Curt Baldus
  1st season as GA coach
  2nd year at Nebraska
  Alma mater: St. Cloud State
- Ross Watson
  1st season as GA coach
  1st year at Nebraska
  Alma mater: Mount Union

Legend

- (C) Team captain
- (S) Suspended
- (I) Ineligible
- Injured
- Redshirt

Roster

Defense

NICKEL
Eric Hagg
D-Lance Thorell
⋅

FS
Matt O'Hanlon
Rickey Thenarse
Matthew May
⋅

WILL	MIKE
Tyler Wortman	Cody Glenn
Colton Koehler	Phillip Dillard; Blake Lawrence
⋅	⋅

SS
Larry Asante
Major Culbert
⋅

CB
Anthony West
Prince Amukamara
⋅

DE	DT	DT	DE
Pierre Allen	Ndamukong Suh	Ty Steinkuhler	Zach Potter
Shukree Barfield	Terrence Moore	Jared Crick	Clayton Sievers
⋅	⋅	⋅	⋅

CB
Armando Murillo
Alfonzo Dennard
⋅

Offense

WR
Nate Swift
Menelik Holt
⋅

LT	LG	C	RG	RT
Mike Smith	Keith Williams	Jacob Hickman	Matt Slauson	Lydon Murtha
Jaivorio Burkes	Mike Huff	Mike Caputo	D.J Jones	Marcel Jones
⋅	⋅	⋅	⋅	⋅

TE
Mike McNeil
Dreu Young
⋅

WR
Todd Peterson
Niles Paul
⋅

QB
Joe Ganz
Patrick Witt
⋅

RB
Marlon Lucky
Roy Helu
Quentin Castille
⋅

FB
Thomas Lawson
Hunter Teafatiller
⋅

Special teams
PK Alex Henry
P Dan Titchener
KR Niles Paul
PR Nate Swift
LS T.J. O'Leary

== Game summaries ==
=== Western Michigan ===
Western Michigan at Nebraska [box score]

Team	1	2	3	4	Total
Western Michigan	0	10	7	7	24
• Nebraska	14	20	10	3	47

- Date: August 30
- Location: Memorial Stadium, Lincoln, Nebraska
- Game start: 6:00 p.m. CST
- Game attendance: 84,485
- TV announcers (FSN PPV): Ron Thulin (Play-by-play), Rich Baldinger (Color), & Stacy Paetz (Sideline)

Nebraska opened the season with expectations below average after finishing 5–7 in 2007. However, there was a buzz in the air as first year head coach Bo Pelini returned to Lincoln to improve a maligned defense and to re-energize the program. Nebraska played very well as the defense seemed much improved from 2007. LB Cody Glenn was the bright spot on defense and seemed to be in on almost every play. The offense continued to be as productive as usual with Joe Ganz at quarterback, en route to a 47–24 win.

=== San José State ===
San José State at Nebraska [box score]

Team	1	2	3	4	Total
San Jose State	6	3	0	3	12
• Nebraska	14	0	0	21	35

- Date: September 6
- Location: Memorial Stadium, Lincoln, Nebraska
- Game start: 11:30 a.m. CST
- Game attendance: 84,146
- TV announcers (FSN PPV): Ron Thulin (Play-by-play), Dave Lapham (Color), & Joel Goldberg (Sideline)

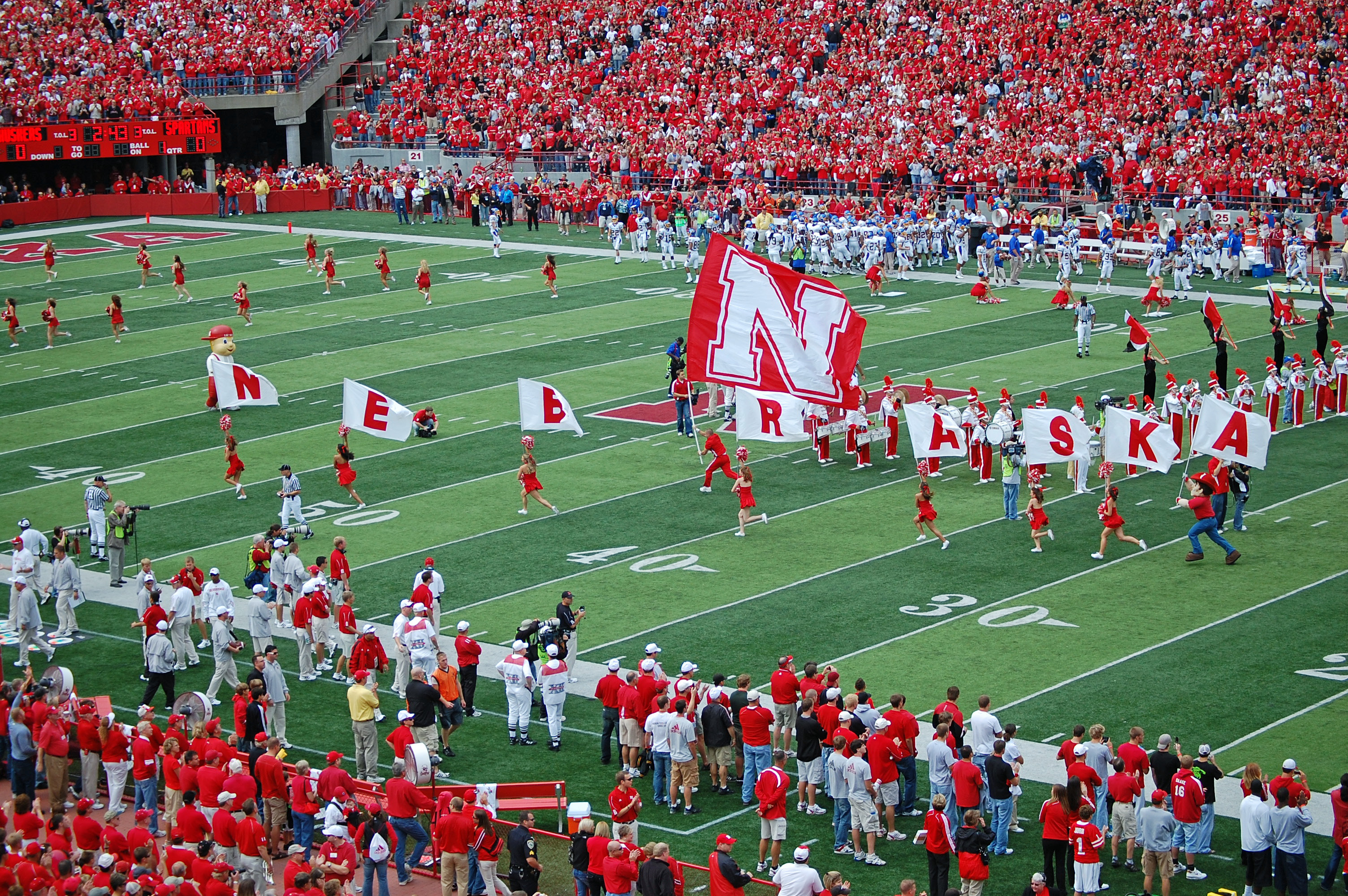
The Husker spirit groups on the field.

Nebraska came into its second game of the year with a little more certainty. San Jose State quickly put a stop to that. The Spartans marched all over Nebraska's defense on the first drive with Kyle Reed scoring on a 12-yard run. Nebraska scored two touchdowns to recapture the lead going into the second quarter. The game turned mostly defensive with San Jose State scoring field goals in the second and fourth quarters. After San Jose State's field goal in the fourth quarter, Niles Paul returned the kickoff 85 yards for a Nebraska touchdown. The return sparked the Cornhuskers as they scored three more touchdowns sealing the game.

=== New Mexico State ===
New Mexico State at Nebraska [box score]

Team	1	2	3	4	Total
New Mexico State	0	0	0	7	7
• Nebraska	7	14	14	3	38

- Date: September 13
- Location: Memorial Stadium, Lincoln, Nebraska
- Game start: 6:00 p.m. CST
- Game attendance: 84,821
- TV announcers (FSN PPV): Ron Thulin (Play-by-play) & Matt Davison (Color)

Nebraska, entering the game 2–0, felt confident going against the New Mexico State Aggies who were playing their first game of the season. On their second drive, the Aggies went down the field with ease only to have their field goal kick blocked by Zach Potter. Nebraska's offense finally looked like it came together, scoring 35 points. The scoring included Marlon Lucky taking a toss and throwing it downfield to quarterback Joe Ganz and then Ganz running 33 yards on an option play.

=== Virginia Tech ===
Virginia Tech at Nebraska [box score]

Team	1	2	3	4	Total
• Virginia Tech	9	9	10	7	35
Nebraska	7	3	7	13	30

- Date: September 27
- Location: Memorial Stadium, Lincoln, Nebraska
- Game start: 7:00 p.m. CST
- Game attendance: 85,831
- TV announcers (ABC): Sean McDonough (Play-by-play), Chris Spielman (Color), & Erin Andrews (Sideline)

Nebraska, 3–0, headed into the Virginia Tech game looking for a win over a ranked team in the first year of Bo Pelini's first year. Virginia Tech got on the board first, blocking a Dan Titchner punt for a safety. The Hokies controlled the game for most of the night, until senior Nate Swift returned a punt 88 yards for a touchdown in the fourth quarter. The Cornhuskers needed a big defensive stop and seemed to have got it on a 3rd down run by Tyrod Taylor. Taylor was tackled out of bounds, but Nebraska defense tackle Ndamukong Suh appeared to have leaped on top of Taylor, prompting an official to throw a flag for a late hit. Bo Pelini, obviously upset, berated the official about the call until the official threw another flag for an unsportsmanlike conduct penalty on Coach Pelini. The penalties put Virginia Tech near the end zone and continued the Hokies' drive, which resulted in Taylor scoring a touchdown to ice the game.

=== Missouri ===
Missouri at Nebraska [box score]

Team	1	2	3	4	Total
• Missouri	14	17	21	0	52
Nebraska	7	3	0	7	17

- Date: October 4
- Location: Memorial Stadium, Lincoln, Nebraska
- Game start: 8:00 p.m. CST
- Game attendance: 85,372
- TV announcers (ESPN): Sean McDonough (Play-by-play), Chris Spielman (Color), & Rob Stone (Sideline)

Missouri came into this game having not won in Lincoln since 1978. That streak was broken as Missouri won by a wide margin, scoring in bunches. After a close first quarter which saw Nebraska tie the game, the Tigers pulled away, building a three touchdown halftime lead. The Cornhuskers were set back by 14 penalties for 101 yards. Tigers on the other hand were not forced to punt in the game. Nebraska managed to make the final score a little more respectable with a late touchdown and by stopping Missouri on fourth down earlier in the quarter.

=== Texas Tech ===
Nebraska at Texas Tech [box score]

Team	1	2	3	4	OT	Total
Nebraska	0	7	3	21	0	31
• Texas Tech	7	10	7	7	6	37

- Date: October 11
- Location: Jones AT&T Stadium, Lubbock, Texas
- Game start: 2:00 p.m. CST
- Game attendance: 53,449
- TV announcers (FSN): Joel Meyers (Play-by-play), Gary Reasons (Color), & Jim Knox (Sideline)

After being routed by Missouri, Nebraska was expecting more of the same against Texas Tech. Instead, they found themselves in the midst of a battle. Todd Peterson caught a touchdown pass with :29 left to tie the game at 31 forcing it into overtime. In overtime, the Red Raiders scored a touchdown but had their extra point blocked, opening the door for Nebraska to win. However, on 2nd down, Joe Ganz' pass was intercepted by cornerback Jamar Wall, ending the game. This was Nebraska's first overtime loss in school history.

=== Iowa State ===
Nebraska at Iowa State [box score]

Team	1	2	3	4	Total
• Nebraska	7	14	0	14	35
Iowa State	0	0	7	0	7

- Date: October 18, 2008
- Location: Jack Trice Stadium, Ames, Iowa
- Game start: 11:30 a.m. CST
- Game attendance: 48,794
- TV announcers (Versus): Ron Thulin (Play-by-play), Glenn Parker (Color), & Lindsay Soto (Sideline)

Playing Iowa State was the trick for Nebraska to solve their three-game losing streak. Nebraska roared to a 21–0 lead at halftime. Iowa State stifled Nebraska's offense for the third quarter and scored a touchdown of their own, but going into the fourth, Nebraska took back momentum, scoring twice to finish off the Cyclones.

=== Baylor ===
Baylor at Nebraska [box score]

Team	1	2	3	4	Total
Baylor	14	6	0	0	20
• Nebraska	7	10	7	8	32

- Date: October 25
- Location: Memorial Stadium, Lincoln, Nebraska
- Game start: 11:30 a.m. CST
- Game attendance: 85,104
- TV announcers (Versus): Ron Thulin (Play-by-play), Kelly Stouffer (Color), & Lewis Johnson (Sideline)

Nebraska let Baylor jump on them for a 20–17 lead going into the half. Nebraska came back from a halftime deficit for the first time since 2003, scoring 15 points in the third and fourth quarters including a safety and a 9-yard touchdown catch by Nate Swift, a catch that broke Johnny Rodgers' record for career catches.

=== Oklahoma ===
Nebraska at Oklahoma [box score]

Team	1	2	3	4	Total
Nebraska	0	14	7	7	28
• Oklahoma	35	14	13	0	62

- Date: November 1
- Location: Gaylord Family Oklahoma Memorial Stadium, Norman, Oklahoma
- Game start: 7:00 p.m. CST
- Game attendance: 85,212
- TV announcers (ESPN): Mike Patrick (Play-by-play), Todd Blackledge (Color), & Holly Rowe (Sideline)

Nebraska ran into an offensive explosion in Norman and in a matter of minutes was down 35–0. Three first-quarter turnovers doomed the Cornhuskers as Oklahoma capitalized on all of them. Nebraska fought through the circumstances to put up a respectable 28 points as the Cornhuskers looked to regroup.

=== Kansas ===
Kansas at Nebraska [box score]

Team	1	2	3	4	Total
Kansas	7	7	7	14	35
• Nebraska	7	7	10	21	45

- Date: November 8
- Location: Memorial Stadium, Lincoln, Nebraska
- Game start: 1:30 p.m. CST
- Game attendance: 85,486
- TV announcers (FSN PPV): Dan McLaughlin (Play-by-play), Matt Davison (Color), & Stacy Paetz (Sideline)

Nebraska vowed the start of a new season heading into this game, one that consisted of three games. Needing only one win to become bowl eligible, Nebraska played exceptional on a frigid day in Lincoln. Nebraska and Kansas went blow for blow until the fourth quarter when a 52-yard touchdown run by Roy Helu Jr. and a 2-yard touchdown catch by Ndamukong Suh opened up the game for Nebraska.

=== Kansas State ===
Nebraska at Kansas State [box score]

Team	1	2	3	4	Total
• Nebraska	14	21	0	21	56
Kansas State	7	7	7	7	28

- Date: November 15
- Location: Bill Snyder Family Football Stadium, Manhattan, Kansas
- Game start: 2:35 p.m. CST
- Game attendance: 48,444
- TV announcers (FSN PPV): Dan McLaughlin (Play-by-play), Rich Baldinger (Color), & Joel Goldberg (Sideline)

Nebraska felt confident heading into Manhattan against Kansas State as lame-duck coach Ron Prince had never beaten them, nor had former Nebraska commit, Josh Freeman. Also, Nebraska's defense got their blackshirts back for the first time this season. Nebraska made a crucial mistake early allowing a 57-yard interception return for a touchdown. Barring that play and a long touchdown pass by Freeman, Nebraska played sparkling defense in the first half. Kansas State scored only twice more one on a methodical drive by backup Carson Coffmann and a kickoff return by Brandon Banks.

=== Colorado ===
Colorado at Nebraska [box score]

Team	1	2	3	4	Total
Colorado	14	10	7	0	31
• Nebraska	14	10	3	13	40

- Date: November 28
- Location: Memorial Stadium, Lincoln, Nebraska
- Game start: 2:30 p.m. CST
- Game attendance: 85,319
- TV announcers (ABC): Ron Franklin (Play-by-play), Ed Cunningham (Color), & Jack Arute (Sideline)

Colorado came into this game fighting for bowl eligibility at 5–6. Nebraska had already secured a spot in a bowl game, but a win would help improve where they would be headed. Colorado would have none of it, taking an early 14–0 lead. Nebraska came back taking a 24–17 edge and was looking to add on going into the half. On a fake field goal play, holder Jake Wesch was supposed to flip it over his head and kicker Alex Henery was supposed to catch it and throw it, a play that was made against Kansas. This time, Colorado's Jimmy Smith picked off the flip in mid-air and returned it 58 yards to tie the game. Late in the fourth quarter, Nebraska trailed 31–30 and had the ball deep in the Buffalo's territory when Patrick Mahnke sacked Joe Ganz for a 15-yard loss, setting up a 4th & 25. It looked like Nebraska was out of Alex Henery's field goal range with the kick being 57 yards. Bo Pelini sent his kicker out anyway after Henery told him he could do it. With 1:55 left, he kicked the 57 yarder, giving Nebraska the 33–31 lead. On Colorado's next drive, Cody Hawkins pass was deflected by Zach Potter and intercepted by Ndamukong Suh who stiff armed Hawkins and rumbled 30 yards for a touchdown, icing the game at 40–31 and sending Colorado home with no bowl. Nebraska finished the regular season 8–4 and Big 12 North Co-Division Champions with Missouri.

=== Clemson ===
Nebraska vs Clemson [box score]

Team	1	2	3	4	Total
• Nebraska	0	3	20	3	26
Clemson	0	14	7	0	21

- Date: January 1
- Location: Jacksonville Municipal Stadium, Jacksonville, Florida
- Game start: 12:00 p.m. CST
- Game attendance: 67,282
- TV announcers (CBS/TD Sports): Craig Bolerjack (Play-by-play), Steve Beuerlein (Color), & Dan Fouts (Color)/Frank Frangie (Play-by-play), Gino Toretta (Color), & Mike Dempsey (Sideline)

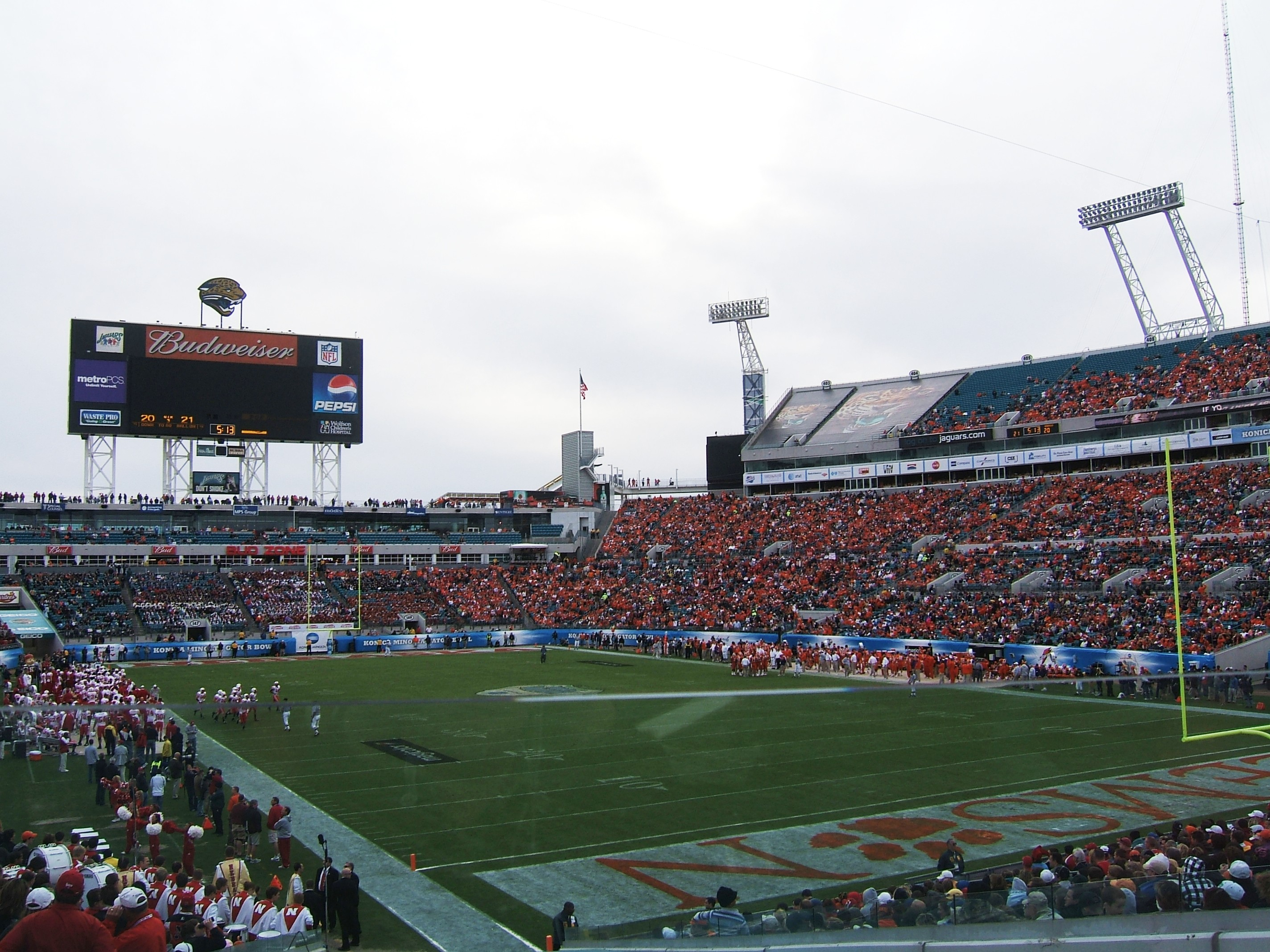
The 2009 Gator Bowl in the fourth quarter

Nebraska defeated Clemson in a come-from-behind 26–21 finish at the 2009 Gator Bowl on January 1, 2009. All 21 of Clemson's points came following Nebraska turnovers. The outcome remained in doubt until the end, as Clemson marched from their own 23 to the Nebraska 10. With 1st and goal to go and about two minutes remaining on the clock, the Blackshirts made their stand, resulting in a 16-yard sack and three Clemson incomplete passes to seal the game. The game was played only days after head coach Bo Pelini and defensive coordinator Carl Pelini returned from their father's funeral in Ohio.

== Rankings ==
Ranking movements Legend: — = Not ranked
	Week															
Poll	Pre	1	2	3	4	5	6	7	8	9	10	11	12	13	14	Final
AP	—	—	—	—	—	—	—	—	—	—	—	—	—	—	—	—
Coaches	—	—	—	—	—	—	—	—	—	—	—	—	—	—	—	—
Harris	Not released				—	—	—	—	—	—	—	—	—	—	—	Not released
BCS	Not released							—	—	—	—	—	—	—	—	Not released

== Statistics ==
=== Team ===
	Nebraska	Opponent
Total scoring	460	365
Points per game	35	28
Total 1st quarter scoring	98	113
Total 2nd quarter scoring	126	107
Total 3rd quarter scoring	81	93
Total 4th quarter scoring	155	52
Total overtime scoring	0	6
First downs	295	228
Rushing first downs	113	85
Passing first downs	171	115
Penalty first downs	11	28
Rushing yards	2210	1540
Rushing attempts	487	420
Yards per rush	5	4
Rushing touchdowns	27	24
Net rushing yards gained	2512	1921
Net rushing yards lost	302	381
Passing yards	3650	3008
Passing completions	294	220
Passing attempts	432	383
Interceptions	11	12
Yards per pass attempt	8	8
Yards per pass completion	12	14
Passing touchdowns	27	19
Total yards offense	5860	4548
Total plays offense	919	803
Average offensive yards per play	6	6
Fumbles – lost	32–18	17–5
Penalties – yards	94–800	64–477

	Nebraska	Opponent
Punts – yards	48–1850	66–2544
Average yards per punt	39	39
Average net yards per punt	32	32
Punts inside 20 yard line	14	18
Punts over 50 yards	4	9
Punt touchbacks	5	4
Punt fair catches	6	9
Kickoffs – yards	88–5613	71–4435
Average yards per kickoff	64	62
Average net yards per kickoff	42	42
Kickoff touchbacks	29	10
Punt returns – yards – TDs	31 – 376 – 1	22 – 208 – 0
Average net punt return yards	12	9
Kickoff returns – yards – TDs	58 – 1245 – 1	58 – 1383 – 1
Average net kickoff return yards	21	24
Interceptions – yards – TDs	12 – 202 – 2	11 – 249 – 3
Fumble recoveries – yards – TDs	2 – 14 – 0	5 – 150 – 2
Average total time of possession	34:01	25:59
Average 1Q time of possession	08:49	06:11
Average 2Q time of possession	08:40	06:20
Average 3Q time of possession	08:35	06:25
Average 4Q time of possession	07:57	07:03
3rd down conversions – attempts	84–178	57–169
4th down conversions – attempts	5–13	10–21
Scored from red zone – attempts	54–62	37–49
Sacks – yards	35–272	21–128
Average yards per sack	8	6
PATs – attempts	56–57	45–49
FGs – attempts	18–21	10–17
Longest rush	58	67
Longest pass	69	68
Longest punt	58	69
Longest field goal	57	48

== After the season ==
The reputation of the Blackshirts, whose trademark black jerseys quietly disappeared during the disappointing 5–7 (2–6) 2007 season, was restored with emphasis during 2008 as the coveted black jerseys were once again distributed to defensive starters on November 11 following a key emotional win over the Kansas Jayhawks.

The season concluded January 1, 2009 with a come-from-behind 26–21 Nebraska victory over the Clemson Tigers in the 2009 Gator Bowl. Nebraska finished as co-division Champions of the Big 12 North Division, with a final record of 9–4 (5–3). Head Coach Bo Pelini's overall career record improved to 10–4 (.714), 5–3 in conference, and 2–0 in bowl games. Pelini's 2008 regular season record of 9–4 was the highest among all 28 Division 1A teams with new head coaches and staffs that year.

=== Awards ===
Award	Name(s)
All-American honorable mention	Ndamukong Suh
All-Big 12 1st team	Ndamukong Suh, Matt Slauson, Nate Swift
All-Big 12 2nd team	Alex Henery
All-Big 12 honorable mention	Larry Asante, Roy Helu Jr., Jacob Hickman, Lydon Murtha, Nate Swift, Zach Potter, Ty Steinkuhler
All-Bowl team	Ndamukong Suh

== Draft picks, signees, or other future professional players ==
- Prince Amukamara, 2011 1st–round pick of the New York Giants
- Larry Asante, 2010 4th–round pick of the Cleveland Browns
- Chris Brooks, 2010 free agent signee of Tampa Bay Buccaneers
- Phillip Dillard, 2010 4th–round pick of the New York Giants
- Joe Ganz, 2009 free agent signee of Washington Redskins
- Cody Glenn, 2009 5th–round pick of the Washington Redskins
- Eric Hagg, 2011 7th–round pick of the Cleveland Browns
- Roy Helu, 2011 4th–round pick of the Washington Redskins
- Alex Henery, 2011 4th–round pick of the Philadelphia Eagles
- Ricky Henry, 2011 UFL 1st–round pick of the Hartford Colonials
- D.J. Jones, 2011 UFL 6th–round pick of the Omaha Nighthawks
- Marlon Lucky, 2009 free agent signee of Cincinnati Bengals
- Lydon Murtha, 2009 7th–round pick of the Miami Dolphins
- Matt O'Hanlon, 2010 free agent signee of Carolina Panthers
- Niles Paul, 2011 5th–round pick of the Washington Redskins
- Todd Peterson, 2009 free agent signee of Jacksonville Jaguars
- Zach Potter, 2009 free agent signee of New York Jets
- Matt Slauson, 2009 6th–round pick of the New York Jets
- Mike Smith, 2011 UFL 5th–round pick of the Omaha Nighthawks
- Ty Steinkuhler, 2009 free agent signee of New York Jets
- Ndamukong Suh, 2010 1st–round pick of the Detroit Lions
- Nate Swift, 2009 free agent signee of Denver Broncos
- Barry Turner, 2010 free agent signee of Detroit Lions
- Keith Williams, 2011 6th–round pick of the Pittsburgh Steelers
