= 2008 Clemson Tigers football team =

American college football season

2008 Clemson Tigers football

Gator Bowl, L 21–26 vs. Nebraska
- Conference: Atlantic Coast Conference
- Atlantic Division
- Record: 7–6 (4–4 ACC)
- Head coach: Tommy Bowden (10th season; first 6 games); Dabo Swinney (interim; final 7 games)
- Offensive coordinator: Rob Spence (4th season; first 6 games)
- Co-offensive coordinators: Billy Napier (interim); Dabo Swinney (interim)
- Offensive scheme: Multiple
- Defensive coordinator: Vic Koenning (4th season)
- Base defense: 4–3
- Captains: James Davis; Tyler Grisham; Michael Hamlin; Cullen Harper; Joe McKissic
- Home stadium: Memorial Stadium

2008 Atlantic Coast Conference football standings
	Conf.			Overall
Team	W		L	W		L
Atlantic Division
Boston College xy	5	–	3	9	–	5
No. 21 Florida State x	5	–	3	9	–	4
Maryland	4	–	4	8	–	5
Wake Forest	4	–	4	8	–	5
Clemson	4	–	4	7	–	6
NC State	4	–	4	6	–	7
Coastal Division
No. 15 Virginia Tech xy$	5	–	3	10	–	4
No. 22 Georgia Tech x	5	–	3	9	–	4
North Carolina	0	–	4	0	–	5
Miami (FL)	4	–	4	7	–	6
Virginia	3	–	5	5	–	7
Duke	1	–	7	4	–	8
Championship: Virginia Tech 30, Boston College 12
$ – BCS representative as conference champion; x – Division champion/co-champions; y – Championship game participant; North Carolina vacated 8 wins, including 4 ACC wins; Rankings from AP Poll

The 2008 Clemson Tigers football team represented Clemson University as a member of the Atlantic Coast Conference (ACC) during the 2008 NCAA Division I FBS football season. Led by Tommy Bowden in his tenth and final year as head coach for the first six games of the season and then by Dabo Swinney as interim head coach for the remainder of the season, the Tigers compiled an overall record of 7–6 with a mark of 4–4 in conference play, placing in a four-way tie for third at the bottom of the standings in the ACC's Atlantic Division. Clemson was invited to the Gator Bowl, where the Tigers lost to Nebraska. The team played home games at Memorial Stadium in Clemson, South Carolina.

Bowden resigned after Clemson lost to Wake Forest on October 9. The team's offensive coordinator, Rob Spence, was also fired as that time. Swinney, who had served as assistant head coach and wide receivers coach, was appointed interim head coach.

== Schedule ==
Date	Time	Opponent	Rank	Site	TV	Result	Attendance	Source
August 30	8:00 p.m.	vs. No. 24 Alabama*	No. 9	Georgia Dome; Atlanta, GA (Chick-fil-A Kickoff Game, rivalry, College GameDay)	ABC	L 10–34	70,097	
September 6	3:30 p.m.	The Citadel*		Memorial Stadium; Clemson, SC (Military Appreciation Day)	ESPN360	W 45–17	76,794	
September 13	12:00 p.m.	NC State		Memorial Stadium; Clemson, SC (Textile Bowl, Hall of Fame Day)	Raycom	W 27–9	77,071	
September 20	1:00 p.m.	South Carolina State*	No. 23	Memorial Stadium; Clemson, SC (Youth Day)	ESPN360	W 54–0	78,607	
September 27	12:00 p.m.	Maryland	No. 20	Memorial Stadium; Clemson, SC (Family Weekend)	Raycom	L 17–20	81,500	
October 9	7:45 p.m.	at No. 21 Wake Forest		BB&T Field; Winston-Salem, NC	ESPN	L 7–12	33,988	
October 18	12:00 p.m.	Georgia Tech		Memorial Stadium; Clemson, SC (rivalry, IPTAY Day)	ESPN	L 17–21	81,500	
November 1	3:30 p.m.	at Boston College		Alumni Stadium; Chestnut Hill, MA (O'Rourke–McFadden Trophy)	ESPNU	W 27–21	41,863	
November 8	3:30 p.m.	at No. 24 Florida State		Doak Campbell Stadium; Tallahassee, FL (rivalry)	ABC	L 27–41	77,013	
November 15	12:00 p.m.	Duke^{†}		Memorial Stadium; Clemson, SC	Raycom	W 31–7	76,217	
November 22	12:00 p.m.	at Virginia		Scott Stadium; Charlottesville, VA	Raycom	W 13–3	51,979	
November 29	12:00 p.m.	South Carolina*		Memorial Stadium; Clemson, SC (rivalry)	ESPN2	W 31–14	82,456	
January 1, 2009	1:00 p.m.	vs. Nebraska*		Jacksonville Municipal Stadium; Jacksonville, FL (Gator Bowl)	CBS	L 21–26	67,282	
*Non-conference game; ^{†}Homecoming; Rankings from AP Poll released prior to the game; All times are in Eastern time

== Rankings ==
Ranking movements Legend: ██ Increase in ranking ██ Decrease in ranking — = Not ranked
	Week															
Poll	Pre	1	2	3	4	5	6	7	8	9	10	11	12	13	14	Final
AP	9	—	—	23	20	—	—	—	—	—	—	—	—	—	—	—
Coaches	9	22	23	21	19	—	—	—	—	—	—	—	—	—	—	—
Harris	Not released					—	—	—	—	—	—	—	—	—	—	Not released
BCS	Not released								—	—	—	—	—	—	—	Not released

== Before the season ==
=== Preseason outlook ===
Clemson came into the 2008 season with great promise. In 2007 the team had finished second in the ACC Atlantic Division with a 9–3 record, earning them a trip to the Chick-Fil-A Bowl. Clemson's 2008 team had experience at the skill positions, headlined by senior quarterback Cullen Harper. As a junior Harper broke 28 school records, passing for 3,000 yards and throwing 27 touchdowns and just 6 interceptions. At the running back position, Clemson platooned senior James Davis and junior C. J. Spiller. Davis was a fast back who ran hard and with power. Spiller was a shifty, elusive back with speed and good hands. Clemson fans nicknamed the pair "thunder and lightning." In addition to these offensive threats, Clemson fifth-year senior Aaron Kelly was a big target at receiver and had sure hands. The Tigers' main area of concern was on the offensive line, which had to be rebuilt with young players. There were also concerns defensively at the linebacker position, which had been thinned by graduation and off-field issues.

With Clemson returning the ACC's number 1 passer (Harper), number 1 runner (Davis) and number 1 wide receiver (Kelly), the team was tabbed as the preseason favorite to win the ACC, and was ranked 9th in both the AP and ESPN/USA Today preseason polls. In addition, Harper was the preseason favorite to be the ACC's Player of the Year.

=== Departures ===
- Philip Merling (DE, junior) – selected in the 2008 NFL draft
- Antonio Clay (LB, junior) – withdrew from classes
- Ray Ray McElrathbey (RB-WR-DB, RS sophomore) – scholarship not renewed, transferred to Howard University
- Cortney Vincent (LB, RS junior) – dismissed from team
- Jeff Orgen (WR, RS freshman) – transfer
- Brian Linthicum (TE, sophomore) – transferred to Michigan State University

== Game summaries ==
=== Vs. Alabama ===
	1	2	3	4	Total
Crimson Tide	13	10	8	3	34
Tigers	0	3	7	0	10

The Tigers were the preseason favorite to win the ACC and were favored going into the season opener at the Georgia Dome. Some believed that the Crimson Tide's youth and inexperience would prove a serious disadvantage against an experienced team like Clemson. However, Alabama quickly took control in what would eventually be a lopsided victory. By the end of the first quarter, Bama led 13–0, and they extended their lead to 23–3 by halftime. The only scare came when C. J. Spiller returned the second half kickoff 96 yards for a touchdown. However, the Tigers failed to score again. James Davis and C. J. Spiller combined for only 20 yards on the ground, while the team's rushing total was 0. Clemson's redshirt senior quarterback, Cullen Harper, completed 20 of 34 passes but had no touchdowns and one interception. Alabama's John Parker Wilson completed 22 of 30 passes with no interceptions. He threw two touchdowns to Nick Walker and Julio Jones, and rushed for one himself. The Crimson Tide went on to win by a score of 34–10.

=== The Citadel ===
	1	2	3	4	Total
Bulldogs	0	7	0	10	17
Tigers	7	14	14	10	45

Running back C. J. Spiller fumbled on Clemson's first drive and the Tigers turned the ball over on downs on their second drive. The Citadel was able to proficiently move the ball through the air, although they were unable to capitalize on their opportunities.

It was the secondary and Michael Hamlin in particular that kept The Citadel from getting back into the game after the Tigers went up 21–0 on two touchdown runs by C. J. Spiller and a TD run by James Davis.

With Clemson leading 21–7 late in the first half, The Citadel scored on a 41-yard pass from Bart Blanchard to Andre Roberts. Then the Bulldogs were in position to score again after they forced Clemson to punt. A touchdown that would have brought the Bulldogs within a score going into halftime was prevented when Hamlin intercepted a Blanchard pass.

On the fourth play of the second half Hamlin intercepted Blanchard again and returned the ball to the Citadel 19-yard line. A Tyler Grisham fumble kept Clemson from scoring, but on Clemson's next drive Spiller scored on a 17-yard TD run to put Clemson safely up 28–7.

Hamlin's third interception came on The Citadel's next drive. He stole the ball at the Bulldog 37 and returned it to the 25. On the next play, Cullen Harper hit tight end Michael Palmer down the right sideline for a touchdown.

Harper completed 14 of 18 passes for 192 yards. While The Citadel held the ball seven more minutes than the Tigers, Harper's efficiency allowed Clemson to easily put away the Bulldogs.

Davis finished with 107 yards and Spiller had 75 yards rushing to aid the offense.

=== NC State ===
	1	2	3	4	Total
Wolfpack	6	0	3	0	9
Tigers	7	10	0	10	27

The annual renewal of the "Textile Bowl" between the Clemson Tigers and N.C. State Wolfpack got off to a rocky start for the Tigers. On the first play of the game, Nate Irving intercepted a Cullen Harper pass and returned it 33 yards for a touchdown, putting the Wolfpack up 6–0. The Tigers responded by blocking the PAT. The next offensive series, the Tigers started on their own 24 and drove the length of the field, capping the drive with a 16-yard touchdown pass from Harper to Jacoby Ford. A 30-yard run by Ford on a reverse also highlighted the drive. The Mark Buchholz PAT put Clemson up 7–6.

The next three drives saw the Tigers and Wolfpack trade punts. With 13:51 left in the 2nd quarter, Clemson began its next scoring drive from its own 33. A 28-yard reception by Jacoby Ford highlighted the drive, with rushes by James Davis, C. J. Spiller, and Cullen Harper helping to aid the drive. With 4th and 2 on the N.C. State 5-yard line, Buchholz came on for a 22-yard field goal to put the Tigers up 10–6. After the next N.C. State drive stalled, Clemson got the ball back on their own 41-yard line. Clemson scored after two passes from Cullen Harper – the first a 31-yard strike to Aaron Kelly, and the second a 28-yard touchdown pass to C. J. Spiller. The PAT put Clemson ahead 17–6.

N.C. State got back on the board late in the third quarter with a 25-yard field goal by Josh Czajkowski to close the gap to 17–9. Clemson started the next drive on the N.C. State 47 and drove it down to the 13, but the drive stalled after an apparent touchdown run by Spiller was negated by a holding penalty. Buchholz kicked a 31-yard field goal to increase the lead to 20–9. N.C. State's next drive resulted in their first turnover of the game, when Crezdon Butler intercepted a pass at the Clemson 4-yard line. The Tigers then sealed the game with a 13-play drive that consumed 7:01 of the clock, capping the drive with a 12-yard touchdown run by Spiller. That would be the final score of the game, as the Tigers prevailed 27–9 and extended their current win streak in the series to five. The last efforts by the Wolfpack to close the gap were snuffed out by an interception by Chris Chancellor.

The Tigers gained 426 yards of total offense. Cullen Harper was 20–28 for 262 yards and 2 touchdowns and 1 interception. C. J. Spiller had a great day as a dual threat, finishing with 61 rushing yards, 35 receiving yards, and 2 touchdowns. Jacoby Ford lead all receivers with 106 receiving yards and a touchdown, in addition to 48 rushing yards. The Tigers defense held the Wolfpack to 288 yards on offense, no offensive touchdowns, and recorded two interceptions.

=== South Carolina State ===
	1	2	3	4	Total
Bulldogs	0	0	0	0	0
Tigers	7	23	10	14	54

The first ever meeting between the Clemson Tigers and S.C. State Bulldogs turned into a lopsided contest, as the Tigers defeated their second FCS team on the season to improve to 3–1. The Tigers received the opening kickoff and struck first on a 68-yard drive capped off by a 1-yard touchdown run by James Davis. S.C. State was unable to respond on any of its two possessions in the first quarter, as they ended in a punt and missed field goal. Clemson, meanwhile, had its next two drives end in interceptions from Cullen Harper.

The Tigers broke the game open in the second quarter. Chris Chancellor intercepted an S.C. State pass early in the quarter. On the next possession, Davis and C. J. Spiller spearheaded the offensive attack, which ended in Davis' second touchdown of the day. The Tigers defense would cut the Bulldogs' next drive short with an interception by Crezdon Butler. Davis would score his third touchdown of the day on the next drive. A safety and a 1-yard touchdown plunge by Cullen Harper would give the Tigers a 30–0 halftime lead.

S.C. State received the ball to start the third quarter, but it was the Tigers who opened up scoring as Chris Clemons picked off a Bulldog pass and returned it for a touchdown. The next three drives saw two Bulldog drives and a Tigers drive stall. Clemson got back on the scoreboard with a Mark Buchholz field goal. Clemson began placing reserves in on offense late in the third quarter. Early in the fourth quarter, the Tigers scored their fifth rushing touchdown of the day on a one-yard run by backup quarterback Willy Korn. Korn would later throw the Tigers' first passing touchdown of the day on a five-yard passes to tight end Michael Palmer. The defense recorded its fourth turnover of the day when Brandon Thompson recovered an S.C. State fumble. The Tigers then ran out the clock, giving them a 52–0 victory.

Cullen Harper completed 14 of 23 passes for 152 yards with no touchdowns and two interceptions. Willy Korn went 7–7 for 73 yards and a touchdown. James Davis led the Tigers' rushing attack with 93 yards and 3 touchdowns. Tyler Grisham led the receiving corps with 41 reception yards on 3 receptions. C. J. Spiller had 105 all-purpose yards on the day (66 rushing, 39 punt return). Overall, the Tigers' offense compiled 432 yards of total offense (225 passing, 207 rushing) and 31 first downs. The defense held the Bulldogs to 149 yards of total offense and eight first downs, while compiling four turnovers on the day.

=== Maryland ===
	1	2	3	4	Total
Terrapins	0	6	7	7	20
Tigers	10	7	0	0	17

Clemson firmly held the momentum of the game for the first half, with their running backs able to exploit holes in the Terps' defensive line. Clemson racked up two touchdowns and a field goal. Despite gaining excellent field position through recovering a fumbled punt on the Clemson 19-yard line and a recovered fumble on the Clemson 30-yard line, Maryland was able to produce just two field goals from those turnovers. The Terrapins drives were also blunted through penalties for two false starts and a holding call.

In the second half, the Terrapins began with a series that fizzled out after a run attempt for a loss, an additional false start, and two incomplete passes. However, the Terrapins defense took the field and stopped a Clemson drive, allowing the Maryland offense another chance. On the first play of their second series, wide receiver Darrius Heyward-Bey executed a reverse, gaining 76 yards before being run down at the Clemson 4-yard line. This set up a short Chris Turner touchdown pass to receiver Torrey Smith, and irreversibly shifted the game's momentum in favor of the Terps. In the fourth quarter, three completions to Danny Oquendo set the stage for a one-yard rush into the end zone by Da'rel Scott. The Maryland defense remained stalwart, allowing Clemson just 31 rushing yards and no points in the second half, compared with 204 yards on the ground and 17 points in the first.

The upset marked the fourth consecutive Maryland win against a ranked opponent (the others: #23 Cal, and, in the 2007 season, #8 Boston College and #10 Rutgers). It is also the fourth consecutive time that the visiting team has won the Maryland-Clemson series.

=== At Wake Forest ===
	1	2	3	4	Total
Tigers	0	0	7	0	7
Demon Deacons	3	0	0	9	12

Riley Skinner's 7-yard touchdown pass to DJ Boldin with 5:28 to go gave the Deacons a 12–7 win against Clemson. In a defensive battle, the Deacons' defense managed to hold Clemson to less than one yard per carry. Wake Forest dominated the game statistically but were unable to capitalize on several scoring chances. The sole turnover in the game was a Cullen Harper pass intercepted by Alphonso Smith, who tied a school record with his 17th career interception. Riley Skinner also threw for 186 yards and a touchdown on 22-of-34 passing, and also added 73 yards on the ground.

=== Georgia Tech ===
	1	2	3	4	Total
Yellow Jackets	7	7	0	7	21
Tigers	0	3	14	0	17

On October 13, Clemson head coach Tommy Bowden resigned and was replaced by receivers coach Dabo Swinney. Tech's defense controlled the ebb and flow of the game forcing six turnovers, which included four interceptions and two fumble recoveries. Safety Dominique Reese returned an intercepted pass from wide receiver Tyler Grisham for Tech's first touchdown. Morgan Burnett added two additional interceptions, the final in the last second of the game. Offensively, Tech continued to produce with its ground game against the Tigers racking up 207 yards rushing. Josh Nesbitt ran untouched for 5 yards for Tech's second score and passed 24 yards to Demaryius Thomas for Tech's go ahead and eventual game winning score. Tech is 6–1 for the first time since 1999.

=== At Boston College ===
	1	2	3	4	Total
Tigers	14	3	0	10	27
Eagles	0	0	7	14	21

On October 27, it was announced that the Boston College Gridiron Club will be sponsoring the O'Rourke–McFadden Trophy and will be awarded to the winner of the Boston College-Clemson game on November 1. The trophy is named after Charlie O'Rourke and Banks McFadden, who were the respective quarterbacks for Boston College and Clemson during the 1940 Cotton Bowl (the 1st meeting between the Eagles and Tigers).

Clemson captured the O'Rourke–McFadden Trophy and its first victory over the Eagles since 1958 (and first win since Boston College joined the ACC) with a 27–21 victory. After the Eagles received the opening kickoff, both teams traded possessions. After Steve Aponavicius missed a 31-yard field goal, the Tigers took over on their own 20-yard line. C. J. Spiller broke a 56-yard run that drove the Tigers into BC territory, and James Davis capped the drive with a 24-yard touchdown run to put the Tigers up 7–0. Later in the 1st quarter, Brandon Maye recovered a fumble to give the Tigers the ball back on their own 30-yard line. Cullen Harper connected with a 23-yard reception to Tyler Grisham and a 45-yard reception to C. J. Spiller to get to the Eagles 2-yard line. Harper then capped the drive with a 2-yard run to increase the lead to 14–0. After trading possessions again for the remainder of the 1st quarter and part of the second, Clemson started their next scoring drive with 8:12 left in the 2nd quarter. Driving from their own 20, the Tigers made their way to the Eagles 10-yard line before having to settle for a Mark Buchholz field goal to increase the lead to 17–0.

Boston College mounted a comeback in the second half, sparked by a McLaughlin interception of Harper to set up the Eagles at the Tigers 7-yard line. Josh Haden would punch the ball in from 1 yard out to make the score 17–7. Early in the 4th quarter, the Eagles would block a Jimmy Maners punt, which was returned by Roderick Rollins 20 yards for a touchdown to close the margin to 17–14. After Davis intercepted another Harper pass to give the Eagles great field position, the Eagles would score on a 16-yard pass from Chris Crane to Brandon Robinson to take 21–17 lead. However, Spiller would take ensuing kickoff 64 yards to set up the Tigers on the Eagles 15-yard line. The Tigers would capitalize on the drive, completing the drive with a 4-yard touchdown pass from Harper to Aaron Kelly to take a 24–17 lead. On the next drive, DeAndre McDaniel forced a fumble that was recovered by Daquan Bowers. The Tigers would put away the game for good with a Buchholz field goal on the next possession. The victory would give interim head coach Dabo Swinney his first win.

Offensively for the Tigers, Harper finished the game completing 21 of 33 passes for 252 yards, 1 touchdown, and 3 interceptions. C. J. Spiller lead the Tigers in rushing (55 yards) and receiving (105 yards), while compiling 242 all-purpose yards for the entire game. James Davis scored the 42nd rushing touchdown of his career, breaking the Tigers' all-time rushing touchdown record. Aaron Kelly recorded his 19th career touchdown reception in the game, which gave him Clemson's record for career touchdown receptions. Defensively, the Tigers held the Eagles to 236 yards and forced three fumbles (2 of which the Tigers recovered).

=== At Florida State ===
	1	2	3	4	Total
Tigers	10	7	3	7	27
Seminoles	10	10	7	14	41

In Swinney's third game as head coach Clemson faced a 6 – 2 Florida State team. Clemson got off to a fast start. Running back C.J. Spiller took a short pass from Cullen Harper and ran 44 yards to score, finishing off an 80-yard opening drive. Five minutes later the Tigers extended their lead to 10 - 0 off Mark Buchholz's 41-yard field goal. Florida State's Graham Gano broke the scoring drought for the Seminoles by kicking a 52-yard field goal. On the next series an ill-advised pass from an under pressure Harper ended up in the hands of defensive end Neefy Moffett, who ran the ball back 18 yards to score. A second Gano field goal put Florida State up 13 - 10. A fumbled punt by Florida State's Tony Carter at the Seminole 9 yard line put Clemson in scoring position, and they regained the lead at 17 - 13 with an 8-yard touchdown pass from Harper to Michael Palmer. Florida State regained the lead with 1:25 left in the first-half on quarterback Christian Ponder's 1-yard run, putting Florida State in the lead 20 - 17 at the half. On the opening drive of the second half Ponder hit wide receiver Corey Surrency on a 14-yard scoring pass, stretching their lead to 27 - 17. Florida State extended their lead on a 1-yard dive by running back Antone Smith in the fourth quarter to put the Seminoles up 34 – 20. Clemson closed the gap to 34 – 27 with 2:20 left on a 2-yard touchdown by Spiller. In the closing moments Smith broke free for a 41-yard touchdown run to secure the win and close out the scoring, 41 - 27.

=== Duke ===
	1	2	3	4	Total
Blue Devils	0	0	0	7	7
Tigers	7	10	14	0	31

The Tigers came into their homecoming game against the Duke Blue Devils in need of winning the last three games for bowl eligibility. Clemson received the opening kickoff, but both teams ended up trading punts in the first four possessions of the game. Duke's second possession of the game saw starting quarterback Thaddeus Lewis suffer a sprained ankle while trying to elude a Clemson defender, which knocked him out of the game and hampered the Blue Devils' offense for the remainder of the game. On the Tigers' third offensive possession, James Davis had three consecutive rushes for 18 yards. After a loss of three yards, Clemson faced 3rd and 10 on the Duke 48-yard line. Cullen Harper completed a pass to Tyler Grisham, who turned it into a 19-yard gain. On the following play, C. J. Spiller ran the ball 24 yards for the game's first touchdown. After trading possession, which saw Duke having to punt twice and a Clemson drive stall on a missed 53-yard field goal, the Tigers took over again with 9:23 left in the second quarter. In this possession, Clemson added to the lead with a 39-yard field goal by Mark Buchholz. After the Tigers' defense forced the Blue Devil offense to go three and out, Clemson got the ball back around midfield. After Cullen Harper completed several completions to Spiller, Jacoby Ford, and Aaron Kelly, the Tigers had the ball on the Duke 1-yard line. James Davis then punched it in to give the Tigers a 17–0 halftime lead.

Duke received the opening kickoff, but the drive ended up stalling around midfield, forcing another punt. Clemson's next drive proved to be very short, as Harper connected on a screen pass to Spiller, who raced 83 yards for his second touchdown of the day. Michael Hamlin intercepted Duke's back-up quarterback Zach Asack on the next possession on the game's first turnover. After a 15-yard reception to Ford and a 26-yard reception to Davis, the Tigers found themselves on the Blue Devil three-yard line. Davis then scored his second touchdown of the day to give the Tigers a 31–0 lead. Duke would finally score late in the fourth quarter on a 28-yard pass from Asack to Eron Riley to close the final gap to 31–7. A late drive by Duke was cut short deep in Clemson territory by an interception by Coty Sensabaugh.

Offensively, the Tigers compiled 466 yards for the game (326 passing and 140 rushing), 25 first downs, and converted 6 of 16 third downs. Cullen Harper completed 20 of 26 passes for 292 yards, 1 touchdown, and no interceptions. C. J. Spiller lead the Tigers in rushing and receiving for the second time in three games, rushing for 71 yards and a touchdown, and 108 receiving yards and a touchdown. James Davis had 43 rushing yards, 26 receiving yards, and two rushing touchdowns. Aaron Kelly had 96 receiving yards on the day and broke the ACC reception record held by Desmond Clark with two back-to-back receptions late in the 4th quarter. Defensively, the Tigers held the Blue Devils to 168 total yards (85 passing and 83 rushing), 2 of 14 on third down conversions, and forced two turnovers. Clemson held the time of possession advantage, controlling the ball for 35:36 compared to Duke's 24:24 of possession.

=== At Virginia ===
	1	2	3	4	Total
Tigers	7	3	0	3	13
Cavaliers	0	3	0	0	3

The Tigers kept their bowl hopes alive with a close 13–3 victory over the Virginia Cavaliers in Charlottesville. With the victory, Clemson captured their first victory in Charlottesville since 2000 and improved the series record against the Cavaliers to 36–8–1.

Neither offense was able to generate much production, as the Tigers barely outgained the Cavaliers 192–190. Cullen Harper completed 18 of 28 passes for 121 yards, no touchdowns, and no interceptions. C. J. Spiller only had 57 all-purpose yards, but completed his 1st career touchdown pass in the first quarter, completing a 15-yard pass to Tyler Grisham for the game's only touchdown. James Davis lead the Tigers with 65 rushing yards, while Jacoby Ford lead the receiving corps with six catches for 42 yards. Mark Buchholz was 2–3 on field goals (good from 32 and 23 yards; missed from 58 yards) and connected on the game's only PAT attempt. Clemson's defense forced four turnovers against the Cavaliers. Michael Hamlin lead the defense with 8 total tackles, an interception, and a pass break up. Crezdon Butler and DeAndre McDaniel also recorded interceptions, while Byron Maxwell forced a fumble that was recovered by Jock McKissic late in the first quarter.

=== South Carolina ===
	1	2	3	4	Total
Gamecocks	0	7	7	0	14
Tigers	10	14	7	0	31

Clemson's final game of the season was against in-state rival South Carolina from the SEC. The game was the 100th consecutive meeting for the two schools in what both referred to as the Palmetto Bowl. At 6–5, Clemson was on the bubble to earn a bowl berth. Interim head coach Dabo Swinney had won three of his last four contests. If the team could defeat the 7–4 Gamecocks Clemson would reach a 7 win season and secure a bowl bid. In addition, many believed a win would secure Swinney as the team's new head coach.

The Tigers opened the game with a drive that reached the South Carolina 30 yard line before a shoulder pad on the ball forced a fumble from C.J. Spiller, and the ball was turned over to the Gamecocks. South Carolina's drive was stopped when Chris Chancellor intercepted a long pass from South Carolina quarterback Chris Smelley at the 15. Clemson then drove 85 yard to score the game's first touchdown. The drive was highlighted by a 39-yard run by C. J. Spiller, and capped off with a 1-yard plunge by James Davis. On the next South Carolina possession Clemson stopped the Gamecocks, then blocked their punt attempt to regain the ball deep in Gamecock territory. This led to a 22-yard field goal by Mark Buchholz to give Clemson a 10–0 lead. In the second quarter, Tigers safety Chris Clemons intercepted a tipped Smelley pass to get the ball back at midfield. Two plays later, Clemson quarterback Cullen Harper maintained balance while being tackled by a Gamecock defender to get the ball 20 yards downfield to receiver Jacoby Ford, who ran it 30 yards to reach the end zone and give the Tigers a 17–0 lead. On the Gamecock's next series a third first-half interception of Smelley, this time by safety Michael Hamlin, gave the Tigers the ball at the South Carolina 41-yard line. Davis capped the drive by running the ball in from 20 yards out to give the Tigers a 24–0 lead. South Carolina recovered a fumble by Harper late in the second quarter to give the Gamecocks the ball at the Clemson 33-yard line. Their short drive was capped with a 16-yard touchdown pass from Smelley to running back Patrick DiMarco to cut the Tigers' lead to 24–7 at the half.

The Gamecocks opened the second half with a 69-yard scoring drive, capped by a 23-yard touchdown pass from Smelley to tight end Weslye Saunders to close to within 24–14. However, after several possession changes Clemson countered with a 44-yard touchdown drive of their own, capped by Davis' third touchdown run of the day to push the lead to 31–14. In the fourth quarter, Chris Chancellor recorded his second interception of the day (and the defense's fourth against Gamecock quarterback Chris Smelley) to cut short a potential Gamecock scoring drive and leave the final margin at 31–14 in favor of the Tigers.

With the victory, the Tigers secured bowl eligibility and gave interim head coach Dabo Swinney his fourth win since taking over at mid-season following Tommy Bowden's resignation. Offensively, the Tigers finished the day with 383 yards of total offense. Cullen Harper completed 12 of 17 passes for 199 yards, 1 touchdown, and no interceptions. James Davis led Clemson's rushing attack with 91 yards and 3 touchdowns in his final game in Death Valley. Aaron Kelly led the Tigers' receivers with four catches for 76 yards. C. J. Spiller had 199 all-purpose yards (88 rushing, 35 receiving, and 76 kick/punt return yards). Defensively, the Tigers held the Gamecocks' offense to 304 yards. Clemson led in time of possession 32:47–27:13 and forced four turnovers compared to two by the Gamecocks.

Two days after the victory Clemson athletic director Terry Don Phillips removed Swinney's interim tag and made him the program's new head coach. The win was Clemson's second straight over South Carolina, extending their overall series lead against the Gamecocks to 65–37–4.

=== Vs. Nebraska—Gator Bowl ===
	1	2	3	4	Total
Nebraska	0	3	20	3	26
Clemson	0	14	7	0	21

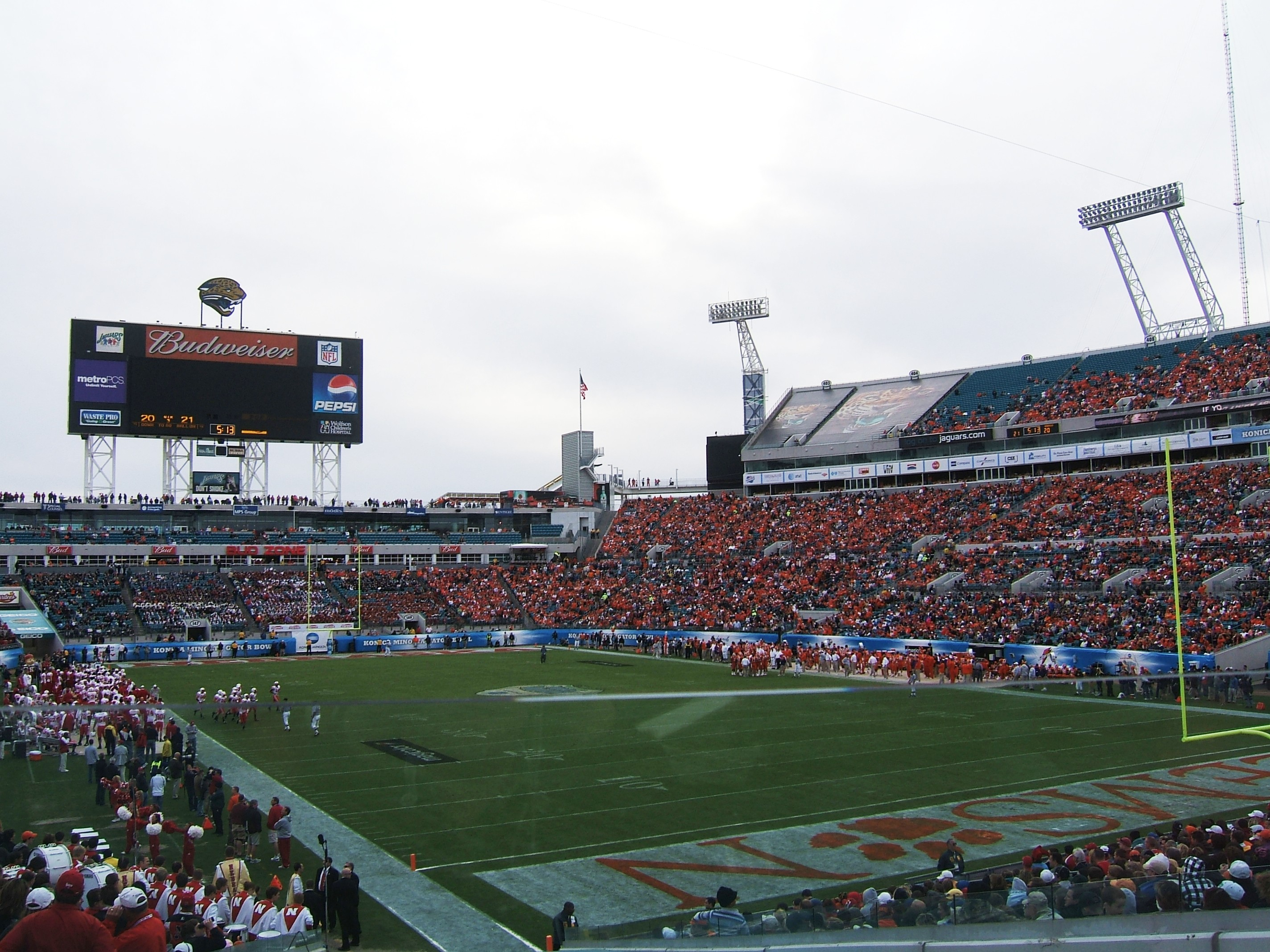
The game in the fourth quarter.

Nebraska defeated Clemson in a come-from-behind 26–21 finish at the 2009 Gator Bowl on January 1, 2009. The game remained in doubt until the very end, as Clemson marched from their own 23 to the Nebraska 10. With 1st and goal to go and about two minutes remaining on the clock, Cullen Harper came up short, resulting in a 16-yard sack and three Clemson incompletions to seal the outcome of the game. The game was played only days after Head Coach Bo Pelini and Defensive Coordinator Carl Pelini returned from their father's funeral in Ohio.

== Personnel ==
=== Coaching staff ===
- Dabo Swinney – Head Coach/Offensive Coordinator
- Rob Spence – Offensive Coordinator (Fired upon Dabo's naming as interim head coach)
- Vic Koenning – Defensive Coordinator/Defensive Backs
- Brad Scott – Assistant Head Coach/Offensive Line
- David Blackwell – Recruiting Coordinator/Linebackers
- Andre Powell – Running Backs
- Billy Napier – Quarterbacks
- Chris Rumph – Defensive Line
- Ron West – Outside Linebackers
- Mike Dooley – Tight Ends/Defensive Video Graduate Assistant
- Andy Ford – Defensive Graduate Assistant
- Paul Hogan – Offensive Graduate Assistant
- Jeff Scott – Wide Receivers

=== Depth chart ===
Defense

FS
Chris Clemons
Sadat Chambers

WLB	MLB	SLB
⋅	Brandon Maye	⋅
⋅	Matt Couch	⋅

Cat
Michael Hamlin
DeAndre McDaniel

CB
Crezdon Butler
Byron Maxwell

DE	DT	DT	DE
Ricky Sapp	Dorrell Scott	Rashaad Jackson	Kevin Alexander
Kourtnei Brown	Miguel Chavis	Jamie Cumbie	Andre Branch

CB
Chris Chancellor
Marcus Gilchrist

Offense

WR
Aaron Kelly
Xavier Dye

WR
Tyler Grisham
Nelson Faerber

LT	LG	C	RG	RT
Cory Lambert	Jamarcus Grant	Barry Humphries	Thomas Austin	Chris Hairston
Jock McKissic	David Smith	Bobby Hutchinson	Mason Cloy	Landon Walker

TE
Michael Palmer
Durell Barry

WR
Jacoby Ford
Terrance Ashe

QB
Cullen Harper
Willy Korn

RB
James Davis
C. J. Spiller

=== Recruiting class ===
Spencer Benton (K; Myrtle Beach, SC; Myrtle Beach HS), DaQuan Bowers (DE; Bamberg, SC; Bamberg-Ehrhardt HS), Stanley Hunter (LB; Duncan, SC; James F. Brynes HS), Marquan Jones (WR; Blythewood, SC; Blythewood HS), Kyle Parker (QB; Jacksonville, FL; Bartram Trail HS), Tarik Rollins (LB; Jacksonville, FL; Chaminade Madonna College Prep), Jon Richt (QB; Athens, GA; Prince Avenue Christian), Dawson Zimmerman (K; Snellville, GA; Brookwood HS), Spencer Adams (S; Matthews, NC; David W. Butler HS), Andre Ellington (RB; Moncks Corner, SC; Berkeley HS), Dalton Freeman (OL; Pelion, SC; Pelion HS), Brandon Thompson (DT; Thomasville, GA; Thomasville HS), Daniel Andrews (S; Jacksonville, FL; Trinity Christian Academy), Jaron Brown (WR; Cheraw, SC; Cheraw HS), Carlton Lewis Jr. (S; St. Augustine, FL; St. Augustine HS), Jarred Crittenton (DE; Wahpeton, ND; North Dakota State College of Science), Matt Sanders (OL; Crestview, FL; Crestview HS), Kenneth Page (OL; Columbia, SC; A.C. Flora HS), Xavier Brewer (CB; Jacksonville, FL; Bartram Trail HS); Dwayne Allen (TE; Fayetteville, NC; Terry Sanford HS); Rashard Hall (S; St. Augustine, FL; St. Augustine HS), Brandon Ford (WR; Hanahan, SC; Hanahan HS); Matt Skinner (ATH; Jacksonville, FL; The Bolles School), Jonathan Willard (LB; Loris, SC; Loris HS), Antoine McClain (OL; Anniston, AL; Anniston HS), Jamie Harper (RB; Jacksonville, FL; Trinity Christian Academy)

== Statistics ==
=== Team ===
	Team	Opp
Scoring		
Points per game		
First downs		
Rushing		
Passing		
Penalty		
Total offense		
Avg per play		
Avg per game		
Fumbles-Lost		
Penalties-Yards		
Avg per game		

	Team	Opp
Punts-Yards		
Avg per punt		
Time of possession/Game		
3rd down conversions		
4th down conversions		
Touchdowns scored		
Field goals-Attempts-Long		
PAT-Attempts		
Attendance		
Games/Avg per Game		

==== Scores by quarter ====
	1	2	3	4	Total
Clemson					0
Opponents					0

=== Offense ===
==== Rushing ====
Name	GP-GS	Att	Gain	Loss	Net	Avg	TD	Long	Avg/G
James Davis	2–1	19	121	1	120	6.3	1	38	60.0
C. J. Spiller	2–0	8	83	1	82	10.3	3	37	41.0
Jamie Harper	2–1	7	38	0	38	5.4	1	13	19.0
Paul Macko	1–0	3	18	0	18	6.0	0	10	18.0
Jacoby Ford	2–0	3	12	6	6	2.0	0	7	3.0
Tyler Grisham	2–1	1	3	0	3	3.0	0	3	1.5
Willy Korn	1–0	1	0	1	−1	−1.0	0	−1	−1.0
Cullen Harper	2–2	6	14	28	−14	−2.3	0	13	−7.0
TEAM									
Total									
Opponents									

==== Passing ====
Name	GP-GS	Effic	Att-Cmp-Int	Pct	Yds	TD	Lng	Avg/G
Cullen Harper	2–2	129.3	52–34–1	65.4%	380	1	47	
Willy Korn	1–0	125.5	11–7–0	63.6%	81	0	36	
Total								
Opponents								

==== Receiving ====
Name	GP-GS	No.	Yds	Avg	TD	Long	Avg/G
Jacoby Ford	2–0	7	113	16.1	0	47	
Tyler Grisham	2–1	8	79	9.9	0	29	
C. J. Spiller	2–0	4	59	14.8	0	27	
Durrell Barry	2–1	2	45	22.5	0	36	
Aaron Kelly	2–2	7	43	6.1	0	15	
Michael Palmer	2–2	2	41	20.5	0	26	
Marquan Jones	2–0	3	24	8.0	0	10	
Xavier Dye	2–0	2	19	9.5	0	11	
Terrance Ashe	1–0	3	18	6.0	0	7	
James Davis	2–1	1	11	11.0	0	11	
Chad Diehl	2–1	1	6	6.0	0	6	
Nelson Faerber	2–0	1	3	3.0	0	3	
Total							
Opponents							

=== Defense ===
Name	GP	Tackles				Sacks	Pass defense		Interceptions				Fumbles		Blkd Kick
Name	GP	Solo	Ast	Total	TFL-Yds	No-Yds	BrUp	QBH	No.-Yds	Avg	TD	Long	Rcv-Yds	FF	Blkd Kick
Kavell Connor	2	12	13	25											
Brandon Maye	2	9	7	16				1							
Michael Hamlin	2	14	2	16					3–78	26.0	0	37			
Chris Clemons	2	12	1	13			1								
Stanley Hunter	2	9	3	12	1–1										
Total															

=== Special teams ===
Name	Punting								Kickoffs				
Name	No.	Yds	Avg	Long	TB	FC	I20	Blkd	No.	Yds	Avg	TB	OB
Mark Buchholz	0	0	0	0	0	0	0	0	10				
Dawson Zimmerman	4	160	40.0	51	0								
Jimmy Maners	1	41	41.0	41	0								
Total													

Name	Punt returns					Kick returns				
Name	No.	Yds	Avg	TD	Long	No.	Yds	Avg	TD	Long
C. J. Spiller	3	15	5.0	0	9	5	163	32.6	1	96
Jacoby Ford	0	12	–	0	12	3	40	13.3	0	22
Crezdon Butler	1	15	15.0	0	15	0	0	0	0	0
Aaron Kelly	0	0	0	0	0	1	1	1.0	0	1
Total										
