= Rob Spence (American football) =

American football coach (born 1958)

Current position
- Title: Offensive coordinator/Tight ends coach
- Team: Georgetown
- Conference: Patriot

Biographical details
- Born: October 10, 1958 (age 68)

Playing career
- 1978–1980: Iona
- Position: Tight end

Coaching career (HC unless noted)
- 1981: Pelham Memorial HS (NY) (OC)
- 1982: Iona Prep (NY) (OC)
- 1983: Iona Prep (NY) (JV)
- 1984–1988: Iona Prep (NY)
- 1989: Iona (OC)
- 1990: Hofstra (OC)
- 1991: Holy Cross (QB)
- 1992–1996: Maryland (assistant)
- 1997–1999: Hofstra (OC/QB)
- 2000: Louisiana Tech (co-OC)
- 2001–2004: Toledo (OC/QB)
- 2005–2008: Clemson (OC/QB)
- 2009: Syracuse (OC)
- 2010: Temple (WR)
- 2011: Bethune–Cookman (OC)
- 2012–2013: Rutgers (QB)
- 2014–2015: Chattanooga Christian HS (TN)
- 2016: Chattanooga (WR)
- 2017: Morgan State (OC/QB)
- 2018–present: Georgetown (OC)

Rob Spence (born October 10, 1958) is an American college football coach, currently serving as the offensive coordinator and tight ends coach of the Georgetown Hoyas.

== Playing career ==
Spence played tailback and receiver at Saint Andrews School in Middletown, Delaware, and tight end at Iona. He graduated with a degree in social work from Iona in 1981.

== Coaching career ==
Spence began his career as offensive coordinator at Pelham Memorial High School in Pelham, New York. After one season, he became offensive coordinator at Iona Preparatory School, and was later promoted to junior varsity coach and head coach. He then spent single seasons as offensive coordinator at Iona College and Hofstra, before joining Mark Duffner's staff at Holy Cross as quarterbacks coach. He moved with Duffner to Maryland from 1992 to 1996. After Maryland, Spence returned to Hofstra for three seasons as OC, then spent one season as co-offensive coordinator at Louisiana Tech. He then moved to Toledo as OC for four seasons.

Spence was hired at Clemson for the 2005 season as head coach Tommy Bowden's fourth offensive coordinator in seven seasons. He was fired by incoming coach Dabo Swinney after Bowden resigned six games into the 2008 season.

After Clemson, Spence was OC at Syracuse for one season, wide receivers coach at Temple for one season, and OC at Bethune–Cookman for one season. He was then quarterbacks coach at Rutgers in 2014 and 2015 before becoming head coach at Chattanooga Christian School for 2016 and 2017. He had one-year stints at Chattanooga as quarterbacks coach and Morgan State as OC before assuming his current position as OC at Georgetown.
