= Wendy (TV series) =

- Genre: Children's
- Developed by: August Media Holdings
- Written by: Anita Kapila
- Directed by: Alan Simpson; Garry Marshall
- Country of origin: Germany; United Kingdom

Production
- Executive producers: Rowan Crawford; Ben Gray; Jyotirmoy Saha; Katharina Pietzch; Ken Anderson; Nicole Keeb
- Producer: Sueann Smith
- Running time: 22 minutes
- Production companies: Wendy Productions Ltd.; Red Kite Animation; ZDF Enterprises

Original release
- Network: Kabillion Girls Rule!
- Release: 16 September 2013 – 10 March 2014

Wendy is a children's program made using 3D CGI animation by Red Kite Animation. working with Indian CG Studio Digitales. It is based on the German comic book series and magazine with the same name published in the late 1990s. It is made in co-production with the UK production company: Wendy Promotions Ltd., German, ZDF Enterprises, as well as the Singapore-based production company, August Media Holdings.

== Synopsis ==
Wendy is a 15-year-old girl who lives at a riding school in the fictional locale of Rose Valley, Canada. Wendy and her friends tackle issues such as adolescence, coming-of-age, growing up, boys, relationships, friendship, family and most of all, horses.

The episodes are aimed at girls aged 6 to 11, especially those with an interest in horses. The show teaches lessons about being bold and staying true to oneself. The show has been airing since 2012.

== Rights ==
The English speaking rights are controlled by Red Kite Distribution Limited. Horse and Country TV in the UK licensed the non-exclusive rights for the series in the UK, Australia and Sweden. The US rights were licensed by the American, Splash Entertainment-owned company, Kabillion. It is currently aired, and dubbed on the subdivision channel: Kabillion Girls Rule! and is available on DISH, and YouTube. France TV Distribution and ZDF - Enterprises handle distribution of the French-speaking territories and the rest of the world respectively.

== See also ==
- Riding High (1995), another TV series based on the Wendy magazine
