= 2009 Gator Bowl =

2009 Konica Minolta Gator Bowl
- 64th Gator Bowl
Nebraska Cornhuskers	Clemson Tigers
(8–4)	(7–5)
Big 12	ACC
26	21
Head coach: Bo Pelini	Head coach: Dabo Swinney
	1	2	3	4	Total
Nebraska	0	3	20	3	26
Clemson	0	14	7	0	21
- Date: January 1, 2009
- Season: 2008
- Stadium: Jacksonville Municipal Stadium
- Location: Jacksonville, Florida
- MVP: Joe Ganz, (QB, Nebraska) & DaQuan Bowers (DE, Clemson)
- Favorite: Clemson by 1.5
- Referee: Jack Wood (Pac-10)
- Attendance: 67,282
- Payout: US$2.5 million per team

United States TV coverage
- Network: CBS
- Announcers: Craig Bolerjack, Steve Beuerlein, and Dan Fouts
- Nielsen ratings: 4.1

The 2009 Gator Bowl was played on January 1, 2009, as part of the 2008 College Football season. It featured the Nebraska Cornhuskers, who finished tied for first in the Big 12 Conference's North Division with Missouri, and the Clemson Tigers, who finished fifth in the Atlantic Coast Conference's Atlantic Division. Nebraska scored 16 unanswered points to beat Clemson after being down 21–10 in the third quarter. This game was the first meeting between the Clemson Tigers and the Nebraska Cornhuskers since the 1982 Orange Bowl where Clemson defeated Nebraska for their first national title. This was the second game between both schools with Nebraska evening up the record.

The Gator Bowl is an annual college football bowl game that is played at EverBank Field in Jacksonville, Florida. It is one of the oldest college bowls, held continuously since 1946. This edition's full name was the Konica Minolta Gator Bowl after its sponsor, Konica Minolta.

== Overview ==
The Gator Bowl has tie-ins from the Atlantic Coast Conference (ACC), Big 12 Conference, and Big East Conferences, as well as independent Notre Dame. They have the right to the third pick of a team from the ACC, and have the option to offer the other spot to the second pick from the Big East, the fourth pick from the Big 12, or Notre Dame. The 2009 game featured the ACC's Clemson Tigers, who finished the 2008 season with an overall record of 7-5 (4-4 in the ACC) playing the Big 12's Nebraska Cornhuskers, who finished the 2008 season with an overall record of 8–4 (5–3 in the Big 12). Clemson went to the Chick-fil-A Bowl in 2007, while Nebraska did not qualify for a bowl game.

== Teams ==
=== University of Nebraska-Lincoln Cornhuskers ===
Nebraska opened up the season with 3 straight wins against Western Michigan, San Jose State, and New Mexico State. Bo Pelini's arrival saw a renewed interest and optimism in Nebraska football, as evidenced by their record Pay-Per View buys. Nebraska then proceeded to lose a close game to Virginia Tech, while getting beat by Missouri the next week. Hitting the road for the first time of the season, the Huskers lost to Texas Tech in overtime. Then the Huskers traveled to Ames, Iowa and beat Iowa State University in a dominant fashion. They came back home and won against the Baylor Bears. Pelini's Huskers then lost on the road the following week to the Oklahoma Sooners. This game marked the first time Pelini went up against Bob Stoops who he formerly worked under as defensive coordinator at the University of Oklahoma in 2004.

On November 8, Bo Pelini's Nebraska Cornhuskers won against Kansas, making them bowl eligible, something his predecessor, Bill Callahan, was able to accomplish only twice in four years. On November 28, 2008, the Cornhuskers faced the Colorado Buffaloes. This game proved to be a close one, with Nebraska getting win #8, 40–31 with the help of a school record 57 yard field goal by Alex Henery and an interception by Ndamukong Suh which was run back for a touchdown. This victory tied Nebraska with Missouri for first in the Big 12 North, although Missouri represented the division in the conference championship game because of its tie-breaking, head-to-head win over the Huskers.

=== Clemson Tigers ===
The season started with head coach Tommy Bowden, who resigned six games into his tenth season with a 3-3 record in 2008. The interim head coach Dabo Swinney took over the team and had a 4-2 record going into the Gator Bowl.

== Recap ==
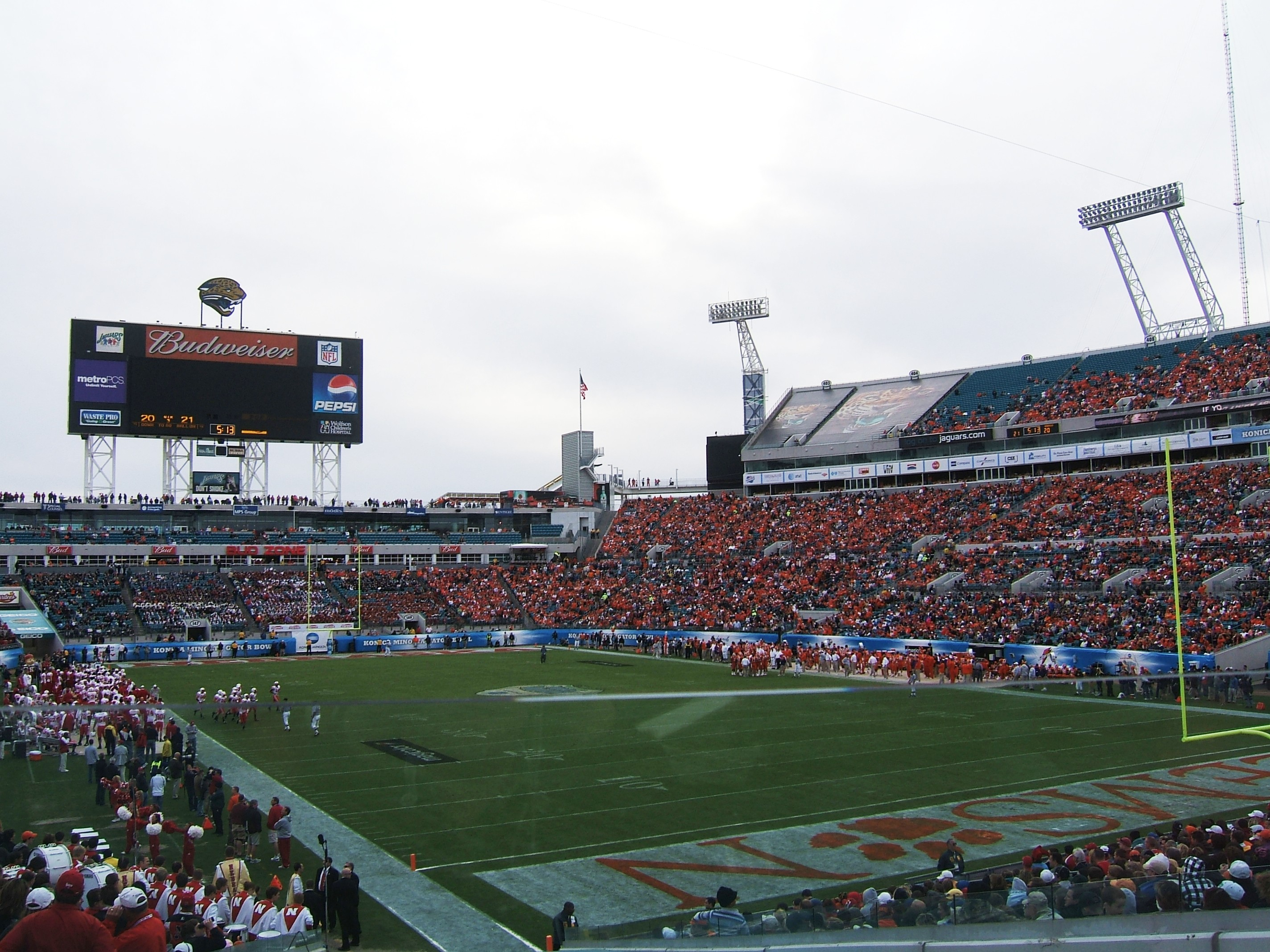
The game during a timeout.

After both teams traded punts throughout most of the first and second quarters, DeAndre McDaniel of Clemson scored on a 28 yard fumble return, with 4:52 in the second, after he batted down a pitch by Joe Ganz. The Cornhuskers battled back, and were able to tack on a 48 yard Alex Henery field goal with 1:10 left in the first half. Clemson was driving for another score before the half when Cullen Harper's pass was deflected and picked off by Nebraska. On the next play, Joe Ganz threw an interception right back to Clemson. Clemson capitalized with a 25 yard touchdown catch by Aaron Kelly with just 0:35 left in the half. Clemson took a 14–3 lead into halftime.

Quarterback Joe Ganz drove the Huskers the length of the field on Nebraska's first possession of the second half, capping off with a 17 yard touchdown catch by Nate Swift to bring the Huskers within four. After Nebraska receiver Niles Paul botched the punt return, Clemson's Jacoby Ford caught a 41 yard touchdown pass to put Clemson up 21–10.

Nebraska struck back with Joe Ganz eventually finding receiver Todd Peterson from 17 yards out for a touchdown to bring the Huskers within four points of Clemson at 21-17. Nebraska's Blackshirt defense intercepted Clemson quarterback Cullen Harper on the next drive. The turnover led to an Alex Henery 28-yard field goal to bring Nebraska within one point at 21–20. Clemson went three-and-out on their next four drives while Nebraska managed two field goals to bring the score to a 26–21 Nebraska lead.

Despite the success of the Nebraska defense, Clemson held one more drive for a go-ahead touchdown. With no timeouts, Clemson converted on a third down and later a fourth down until they eventually drove down to the NU 10 yard line for a 1st & Goal situation. On 2nd & Goal, Nebraska cornerback Eric Hagg sacked Cullen Harper for 16 yards back at the NU 26. On 3rd & Goal, Harper found his tailback C.J. Spiller in the endzone, only to have the ball knocked from Spiller's hands by Cornhusker safety, Matt O'Hanlon. Facing a 4th & Goal, Harper threw an incomplete pass to end their drive, giving the ball back to Nebraska with no way to stop the clock. Nebraska kneeled on the ball three times, ending the game and giving the Huskers the 26–21 victory.

== Scoring summary ==
Scoring Play	Score
2nd Quarter
Clemson - DeAndre McDaniel 28 yard fumble return (Mark Buchholz kick), 4:52	Clemson 7-0
Nebraska - Alex Henery 48 yard FG, 1:10	Clemson 7-3
Clemson - Aaron Kelly 25 yard TD pass from Cullen Harper (Buchholz kick), :35	Clemson 14-3
3rd Quarter
Nebraska - Nate Swift 17 yard TD pass from Joe Ganz (Henery kick), 12:24	Clemson 14-10
Clemson - Jacoby Ford 41 yard TD pass from Harper (Buchholz kick), 10:06	Clemson 21-10
Nebraska - Todd Peterson 19 yard TD pass from Ganz (Henery kick), 7:54	Clemson 21-17
Nebraska - Henery 28 yard FG, 5:13	Clemson 21-20
Nebraska - Henery 28 yard FG, 1:40	Nebraska 23-21
4th Quarter
Nebraska - Henery 22 yard FG, 5:20	Nebraska 26-21

== Aftermath ==
The Nebraska Cornhuskers head coach Bo Pelini continued his perfect postseason record to 2-0. Pelini's 2008 regular season record of 9-4 was the highest among all 28 Division 1A teams with new head coaches and staffs that year. Ndamukong Suh was named to the all Bowl team award.

== See also ==
- List of college bowl games
