= Brandon Thompson (American football) =

American football player (born 1989)

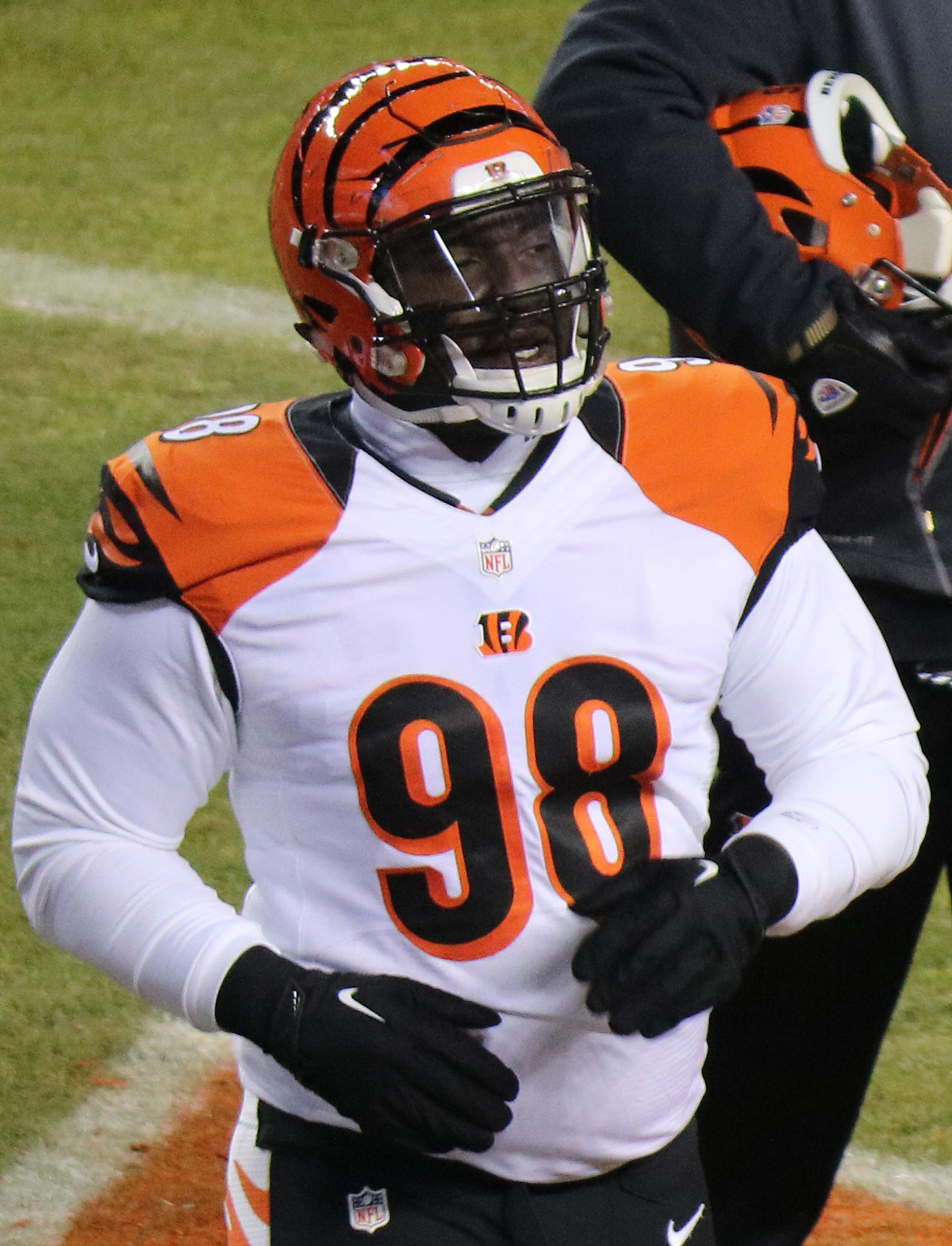
- Thompson with the Cincinnati Bengals in 2015

No. 79, 98
- Position: Defensive tackle

Personal information
- Born: October 19, 1989 (age 37); Thomasville, Georgia, U.S.
- Listed height: 6 ft 2 in (1.88 m)
- Listed weight: 314 lb (142 kg)

Career information
- High school: Thomasville
- College: Clemson
- NFL draft: 2012: 3rd round, 93rd overall pick

Career history
- Cincinnati Bengals (2012–2016); Cleveland Browns (2017)*
- * Offseason or practice squad member only

Awards and highlights
- Second-team All-ACC (2011)

Career NFL statistics
- Total tackles: 53
- Sacks: 3
- Stats at Pro Football Reference

Brandon Thompson (born October 19, 1989) is an American former professional football player who was a defensive tackle in the National Football League (NFL). He played college football for the Clemson Tigers and was selected by the Cincinnati Bengals in the third round of the 2012 NFL draft.

== Early life ==
Thompson attended Thomasville High School in Thomasville, Georgia. As a senior, he had 19 sacks and 61 tackles.

Regarded as a four-star recruit by Rivals.com, Thompson was listed as the ninth best defensive tackle prospect of his class.

== College career ==
Thompson was originally redshirted as a freshman in 2008, but had the redshirt taken off after an injury to Jamie Cumbie. He played in the team's final 12 games and recorded 15 tackles and a sack. As a sophomore in 2009, he started all 13 games and had 27 tackles. As a junior in 2010, he had 41 tackles and a sack.

== Professional career ==
Pre-draft measurables
Height	Weight	Arm length	Hand span	40-yard dash	10-yard split	20-yard split	20-yard shuttle	Three-cone drill	Vertical jump	Broad jump	Bench press
6 ft 2 in (1.88 m)	314 lb (142 kg)	33 1/2 in (0.85 m)	10 in (0.25 m)	5.20 s	1.77 s	2.85 s	4.71 s	7.97 s	31.0 in (0.79 m)	8 ft 4 in (2.54 m)	35 reps
All values from NFL Combine/Pro Day

=== Cincinnati Bengals ===
Thompson was selected by the Cincinnati Bengals in the third round, 93rd overall, in the 2012 NFL draft. In 2013, he played in all 16 regular-season games, starting the last seven games, which included the Wild Card playoff game, where he replaced the injured Geno Atkins.

On March 25, 2016, Thompson signed a one-year contract with the Bengals that will keep him through the 2016 season. He was placed on the Reserve/PUP list to start the season after he suffered a torn ACL in Week 17 of the 2015 season. Since he spent the entire season on reserve, his contract tolled, keeping him under contract for the 2017 season.

On August 20, 2017, Thompson was released by the Bengals.

=== Cleveland Browns ===
On August 22, 2017, Thompson was signed by the Cleveland Browns. He was released on September 1, 2017, during roster cutdowns.
