= Matt Davison =

Canadian mathematician (born 1969)

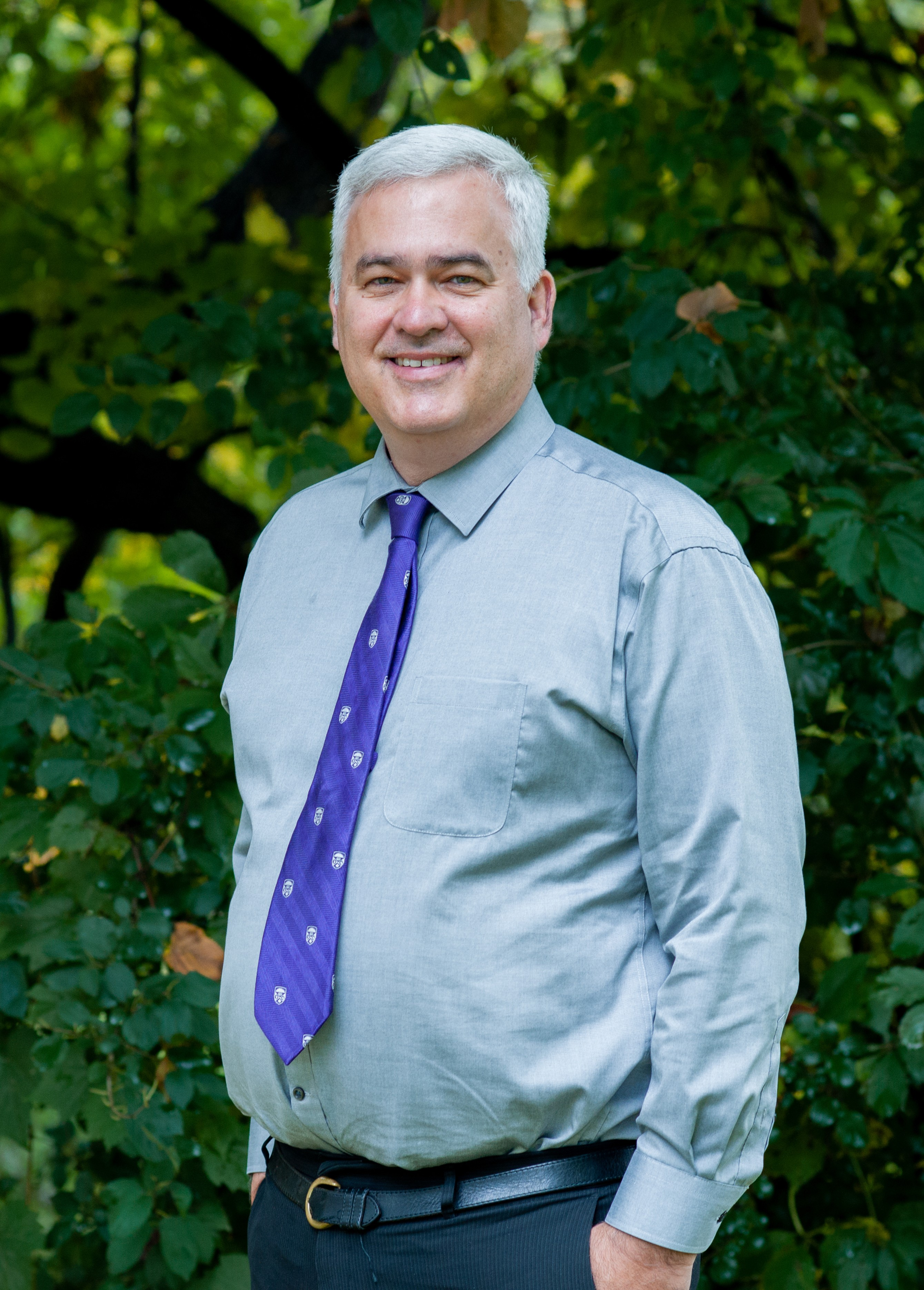
- Born: 1969 (age 56–57); Hamilton, Ontario, Canada
- Occupations: Professor Mathematician; Statistician Dean of Science

Academic background
- Education: B. Sc., University of Toronto M. Sc., Western University Ph.D., Western University
- Alma mater: Western University
- Thesis: Spatial and deterministic limits on randomness (1995)

Academic work
- Discipline: Quantitative finance Applied Mathematics
- Sub-discipline: Energy finance Personal & household finance Industrial Mathematics
- Institutions: Western University

Matt Davison is a Canadian mathematician and university professor. He is a currently serving as Professor at the Departments of Statistical & Actuarial Science and Mathematics, Dean of the Faculty of Science at Western University. Davison is also the Director of Canada's Financial Wellness lab.

== Education ==
After graduating from the University of Toronto with a Bachelor of Applied Science in Engineering Science (1991), Davison attended Western University where he earned a M.Sc (1993) and Ph.D. in Applied Mathematics (1995).

== Career and work ==
Before entering academia, Davison worked as Assistant Vice President of Equity Arbitrage at Deutsche Bank Canada from 1997 to 1999. Prior to this role, he was a postdoctoral research fellow at the Physiology Institute of the University of Bern, Switzerland, from 1995 to 1997.

Since joining Western University in 1999, Davison has focused his research in the field of quantitative finance. His significant contributions to the field include authoring Quantitative Finance: A Simulation-Based Introduction Using Excel in 2014, 9 book chapters, and publishing over 80 papers. Davison has 23 PhD students graduated from his research group, and 4 PhD students in current progress.

Davison held a Tier 2 Canada Research Chair in Quantitative Finance from 2006 to 2016. In 2015, he was named a Fellow of the Fields Institute for Research in the Mathematical Sciences, further recognizing his impact in the academic community. Davison's research has been well funded by MITACS, NSERC and private sector partners throughout his academic career.

Davison was Chair of the Department of Statistical & Actuarial Sciences from 2014 to 2017 and Acting Chair of the Applied Math Department from 2015 - 2017. From 2017 to 2018, he served as the founding director of Western's School of Mathematical & Statistical Sciences, which was designed to enhance collaborative research and education. That same year, he was appointed Dean of the Faculty of Science, a role he continues to fulfill.

In addition to his university duties, Davison has served the broader academic community. His roles included President of The Canadian Applied and Industrial Mathematics Society from 2017 to 2019 and a board member of the Fields Institute for Research in the Mathematical Sciences from 2018 to 2021 and of the Institute for Catastrophic Loss Reduction since 2018.

In 2021, Davison co-founded Canada's Financial Wellness lab, which he now leads. This multi-university, multi-stakeholder initiative focuses on developing quantitative finance and data analytics solutions that will enable Canadian households to enhance their financial resilience. The lab is a collaboration of several universities, including Wilfrid Laurier University, York University, the University of British Columbia, and the University of Winnipeg, along with industry partners including Coast Capital, Libro Credit Union, National Payroll Institute, Ceridian, Aligned Capital Partners (CI Financial), and Environics Analytics, to broaden its impact and reach.
