= 2008 Big 12 Conference football season =

American college football season

- League: NCAA Division I FBS (Football Bowl Subdivision)
- Sport: football
- Teams: 12

Regular season
- North champions: Missouri Tigers, Nebraska Cornhuskers
- South champions: Oklahoma Sooners, Texas Longhorns, and Texas Tech Red Raiders

Big 12 Championship Game
- Champions: Oklahoma Sooners

Football seasons
- 2007 2009

2008 Big 12 Conference football standings
	Conf.			Overall
Team	W		L	W		L
North Division
No. 19 Missouri xy	5	–	3	10	–	4
Nebraska x	5	–	3	9	–	4
Kansas	4	–	4	8	–	5
Colorado	2	–	6	5	–	7
Kansas State	2	–	6	5	–	7
Iowa State	0	–	8	2	–	10
South Division
No. 5 Oklahoma xy$	7	–	1	12	–	2
No. 4 Texas x%	7	–	1	12	–	1
No. 12 Texas Tech x	7	–	1	11	–	2
No. 16 Oklahoma State	5	–	3	9	–	4
Baylor	2	–	6	4	–	8
Texas A&M	2	–	6	4	–	8
Championship: Oklahoma 62, Missouri 21
$ – BCS representative as conference champion; % – BCS at-large representative; x – Division champion/co-champions; y – Championship game participant; Rankings from AP Poll

The 2008 college football season was the 13th Big 12 Conference football season. The season concluded with ties for both northern and southern divisions. Tiebreakers were used to select divisional the participants for the 2008 Big 12 Championship Game, in which Oklahoma won 62–21 against Missouri to qualify for the 2009 BCS National Championship Game.

== Regular season ==
=== Northern Division ===
Missouri tied with Nebraska for the Northern divisional championship, each having a 5–3 win–loss record in conference games. Missouri qualified for the conference championship game by virtue of its 52–17 win in the game between the teams.

=== Southern Division ===
There was a three-way tie between the Oklahoma Sooners, Texas Longhorns, and Texas Tech Red Raiders, each with a 7–1 record. Oklahoma became divisional representatives by virtue of tiebreaker criteria which dissatisfied some fans.

==== Texas–Oklahoma ====
	1	2	3	4	Total
#5 Texas	3	17	10	15	45
#1 Oklahoma	7	14	7	7	35

The game against the 2008 Oklahoma Sooners football team marked the 103rd meeting of the Red River Rivalry, which has been called one of the greatest sports rivalries. It is the longest running rivalry for the Longhorns. Since 1929 the game has been held at the Cotton Bowl in Dallas, Texas typically in mid-October with the State Fair of Texas occurring adjacent to the stadium. Prior to 2008, Texas led the series 57–40–5.

Texas won this meeting, 45–35. It was the highest scoring event in the history of the rivalry, and it was seen by the most fans ever to attend the Red River Rivalry—a record 92,182.

==== Texas–Texas Tech ====
	1	2	3	4	Total
#1 Texas	0	6	13	14	33
#7 Texas Tech	12	10	7	10	39

The series with the Texas Tech Red Raiders began in 1928 and the Longhorns' record through 2007 was 43–14–0. In the 2006 contest, #5 ranked Texas barely came away with a 35–31 win over an unranked Texas Tech team. In the 2007 game #14 Texas won 59–43. During his post-game press conference, Texas Tech's Mike Leach used most of his time to rail against the officiating crew for incompetence and bias. He speculated that the officials may have favored Texas because the head official lives in Austin, because they are incompetent, or possibly because the conference wants Texas to appear in a BCS bowl because of the increased appearance fees that such a bowl generates for the conference. Jim Vertuno of the Associated Press wrote "Leach was upset officials disallowed two Tech touchdowns in the third quarter. The first was overruled when video replay clearly showed the receiver let the ball hit the ground. On the next play, a touchdown pass was negated by a holding penalty. Leach also wanted, but didn't get, a flag for roughing the quarterback." The Lubbock Avalanche-Journal reported, "Big 12 policy prohibits coaches from commenting publicly about game officials, so Leach’s actions leave him open to reprimand, fine or worse." ESPN reported, "Leach's rant will likely draw a fine from the league and possibly a suspension." The Big 12 fined Leach $10,000, the largest fine in conference history.

The morning of the game, Las Vegas casinos favored Texas by 3½ points. The weather forecast called for a temperature of 72 °F (22 °C) and clear skies at kick-off. Students camped for a week to secure seating, and ESPN's College GameDay broadcast from Lubbock, Texas for the first time in the program's history.

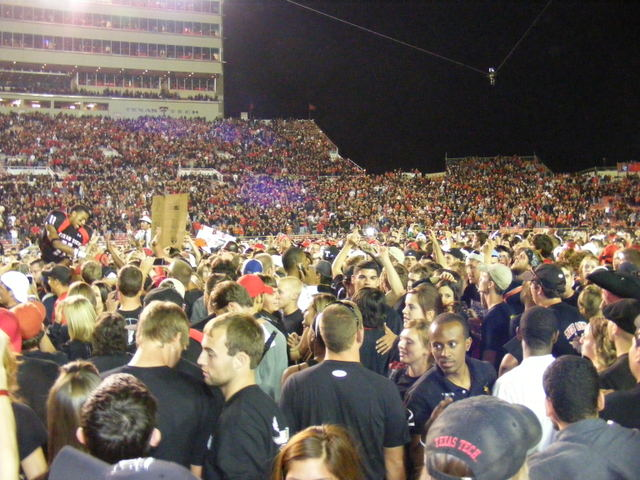
Students and fans rush the field after the #5 Red Raiders upset the #1 Longhorns

Texas Tech won the coin toss and elected to receive the ball. The Longhorns forced a stop and the ensuing punt rolled inside the Texas 2-yard line. Offensive coordinator Greg Davis opted to line up in the I formation, an unusual formation for a team having trouble establishing a strong running game. The Texas running back was stopped in the end-zone for a two-point safety. Tech led the Horns for most of the game, by as much as nineteen points. Texas rallied to take a one-point lead with less than 1½ minutes remaining in the game. On the Red Raiders drive, a Texas defensive back missed an interception that would have sealed a Texas victory, letting the ball slide through his hands. In the final minute, down 33–32 with one timeout remaining, Texas Tech QB Graham Harrell engineered a drive down the field by throwing for first downs which repeatedly stopped the clock in order to move the chains, and almost threw an interception that fell through the hands of Texas defensive back Blake Gideon that almost certainly would have ended the comeback attempt. Harrell's final play was a pass to wide receiver Michael Crabtree who caught the ball near the sideline and somehow broke away from two Longhorn defenders to scamper in for the winning score with one second left to play. The extra point gave the Red Raiders a 39–33 lead with one second remaining. The Tech fans had rushed the field after the touchdown, and again after the extra point. Tech was penalized accordingly and had to kick off from the 7½-yard line. Texas took the squib kick and lateraled twice in an attempt to score on the kickoff, but Tech caught one of the laterals to end the game. Subsequent to the loss, Texas fell from #1 to #4 in the BCS Poll, and Texas Tech rose to #2, behind Alabama.

==== Oklahoma–Texas Tech ====
	1	2	3	4	Total
#2 Texas Tech	0	7	7	7	21
#5 Oklahoma	7	35	16	7	65

Texas Tech and Oklahoma first played in 1992. Coming into the game, the Sooners led the series 11–4–0 though the Red Raiders had won 2 of the last 3 with the last loss coming in Norman in 2006. The only road game Tech had won in the series was during the inaugural season of the Big 12 in 1996. Under head coach Bob Stoops, the Sooners had lost only two games at home. The Sooners were 7-point favorites.

The Red Raiders opened the game with a kickoff return to their 32-yard line. The Sooners forced a punt, and fielded their offense at their 27. The Sooners scored a touchdown with 8:59 left in the first. DeMarco Murray contributed 48 rushing yards in the drive. Tech returned the ensuing kickoff to their 22, and a Sooner personal foul after the return gave the Red Raiders 15 yards. Texas Tech lost 10 of those yards due to a delay of game and a false start. Starting at their 27, the Red Raiders were stopped at the Oklahoma 48, where they punted again. The Sooners got the ball on their 20. On the second play of the drive, Oklahoma was punished again with a 15-yard penalty. After three failed attempts to pass the ball for a first down, the Sooners elected to make their first punt. On the next Tech possession, Graham Harrell was sacked on two consecutive plays, once by Adrian Taylor and the other by Gerald McCoy. Coming into the game, the Red Raiders ranked second in the nation in sacks allowed, with only 5. The Sooners ended the first quarter with a 42-yard reception by tight end Jermaine Gresham and two rushes by Chris Brown for a combined 12 yards.

Once the second quarter commenced, both Brown and Gresham moved the ball for a touchdown on three different plays. Tech started their next drive at their own 38 and advanced the ball through the air to eventually get to the Oklahoma 15. Two incompletions caused the Red Raiders to face a 4th-and-3. Tech decided to go for it. Woods was unable to catch a pass by Harrell to convert and Tech turned the ball over on downs. Murray rushed the ball for 23 yards on Oklahoma's first play of the drive. Murray followed with a 31-yard reception, which put the ball on the Tech 30. After two rushes by Brown, Gresham scored a touchdown on a 19-yard catch, and the subsequent extra point extended the Sooners lead to 21–0. Oklahoma's defense forced Tech to four plays on the next drive, with the fourth play being a 4th-and-4, Tech's second 4th down conversion attempt. With 9:31 remaining, Oklahoma completed a 1:44 scoring drive, which was capped by Juaquin Iglesias' 28-yard scoring reception. On the following possession, the Red Raiders reached the end zone, thanks to Harrell's 25-yard throw to Tramain Swindall. Matt Williams' extra point brought the score to 28–7. With 6:28 left in the half, Oklahoma began to drain the clock using their running game. The Sooners eventually scored on the 12th play of the drive. Once Tech got the ball, about a minute was left on the clock. On the second play, Harrell threw an interception to Travis Lewis, who returned the ball 47 yards. Tech offensive guard Brandon Carter, who stopped Lewis at the Tech 1, received a personal foul. Murray scored on a 1-yard rush to increase the Sooners' lead to 42–7. Tech got the ball again after the Sooner touchdown with 18 seconds remaining in the game. Harrell threw a shovel pass to Baron Batch, who ran 21 yards to the Tech 28. The half ended with Tech receiving a 16-yard personal foul. The Red Raiders left the field facing their biggest deficit of the season (35 points).

Tech attempted an onside kick to start off the second half, though the Sooners grabbed the ball at the Tech 34. OU ended the drive on a 33-yard field goal. Tech fumbled on their next possession, Oklahoma's Keenan Clayton recovered the fumble and return it 53 yards to the Tech 3. The Sooners added another 7 points to extend their lead to 52–7. Tech cranked up its passing game on its next possession, eventually scoring a touchdown and extra point with 5:39 remaining in the third quarter. On the subsequent drive, the Red Raider defense forced their first sack on Bradford, and also forced the Sooners to punt. The Sooner defense countered in the next drive by forcing a three-and-out. The Sooner offense then added another score on a 66-yard reception by Manuel Johnson. The Tech defense blocked the extra point, and the score remained at 58–14.

In the fourth quarter, Tech failed to convert another fourth down, producing another turnover. Oklahoma scored immediately afterwards, improving their lead to 65–14. On the next possession, Tech was able to make three pass completions of at least 12 yards, though on the final play of the drive, Harrell lost the ball to the Sooners on a sack. With 10:50 left in the game, the Sooners started to run out the clock. The Red Raiders stopped them from scoring on a 4th down from the 1. Tech got the ball back with 4:48 on the clock. After a few plays, Tech faced another 4th down, and this time was able to convert it with a 13-yard throw to Crabtree. Tech later score their third touchdown with 11 seconds left, and Williams tacked on the extra point to change the score to 65–21. Tech attempted an onside kick and recovered the ball. The final play was a short-yard catch by Woods.

Since the Sooners won, Tech, Texas, and OU all tied for first in the division at 6–1. If all three teams win their regular season finales to tie again at 7–1, the highest ranked team in the BCS standings will earn a spot in the Big 12 Championship game. Sports columnists have also stated that the quarterback of the winning team would be the front runner for the Heisman Trophy.

==== Tiebreaker ====
The Divisional Championship is shared where multiple teams have the same win–loss record in conference games. Texas Tech, Texas, and Oklahoma were all presented Big 12 South Champion trophies from the Big 12. However, only one of the co-champions can represent the division in the conference championship game. Since 2006, the Big 12 Conference regulations had included the following "Divisional Tiebreakers":

a. If two teams are tied, the winner of the game between the two tied teams shall be the representative
b. If three or more teams are tied, steps 1 through 7 will be followed until a determination is made. If only two teams remain tied after any step, the winner of the game between the two tied teams shall be the representative

1. The records of the three teams will be compared against each other
2. The records of the three teams will be compared within their division
3. The records of the three teams will be compared against the next highest placed teams in their division in order of finish (4, 5 and 6)
4. The records of the three teams will be compared against all common conference opponents
5. The highest ranked team in the first Bowl Championship Series Poll following the completion of Big 12 regular season conference play shall be the representative
6. The team with the best overall winning percentage [excluding exempted games] shall be the representative
7. The representative will be chosen by draw.

Since three teams were tied, part (b) was applied. Each of the first four steps failed to break the tie, as each team had idential win–loss records, as follows:

(b.1) 1–1 against each other
(b.2) 4–1 within their division
(b.3) 3–0 next highest in turn in division (strictly, three separate steps, 1–0 against 4th-place Oklahoma State, then 1–0 against 5th-place Baylor, finally 1–0 against 6th-place Texas A&M)
(b.4) 4-0 against all common conference opponents (the three teams in b.3 plus Kansas)

After these four ties, the fifth test (b.5) was applied. On the Bowl Championship Series (BCS) rating on November 30, 2008, Oklahoma was second with a rating of .9351, Texas third at .9223, and Texas Tech seventh at .7805. Thus Oklahoma represented the Southern Division in the 2008 Big 12 Championship Game.

Texas fans objected to the outcome, and they and others made various arguments for considering it unfair:

- More weight should have attached to Texas's victory over Oklahoma, because it came at neutral ground, whereas the other two head-to-head games were won by the home team.
- Other criteria favored Texas:
  - The AP Poll of November 30 (not part of the BCS rating) ranked Texas 3rd, Oklahoma 4th, and Texas Tech 8th.
- The BCS ratings were considered inappropriate:
  - It was a national endeavor as opposed to one specific to the Big-12 region
  - A poll of coaches and journalists is subjective and liable to bias
  - The computer algorithm was simplistic.

In 2010 the Big 12 changed Divisional Tiebreaker rule (b.5) so that, if the top two teams are within one ordinal place in the BCS ratings, then the winner of their head-to-head game will be the representative. Such a rule in 2008 would have favored Texas.

Texas Tech fans also objected to the outcome and to the use of the BCS standings as a tiebreaker:

- They argued that the BCS incorporated national-perception and non-conference factors that were irrelevant to determining a divisional representative within the Big 12 Conference.
- Supporters noted that all conference-only comparisons in steps (b.1) through (b.4) had ended in ties, meaning the choice ultimately depended on an external ranking system.
- Many Tech fans contended that their head-to-head win over Texas and identical divisional record should have carried greater weight than national polls.
- Critics further observed that Oklahoma’s decisive late-season win over Texas Tech, and the timing of that game immediately before the final BCS release, amplified recency-bias and margin-of-victory effects in human voting.
- Some also argued that the BCS formula’s reliance on human polls made it susceptible to subjective judgments and brand-name effects, favoring Oklahoma over a smaller-profile program such as Texas Tech.
- The subsequent 2010 change to the Big 12 tiebreaker rule—giving head-to-head results priority when two tied teams finished within one BCS ranking position—was seen by some Texas Tech supporters as acknowledging flaws in the earlier procedure while still offering no remedy for three-way ties of the type that had occurred in 2008.

== Championship game ==
Oklahoma won 62–21 against Missouri to qualify for the 2009 BCS National Championship Game, where it was beaten 14–24 by Florida.

== Sources ==
- Lee, Ilhyung (2018). "The Danish Question, the Mailman, and Justice Scalia: Examining the Group Play Tiebreaker Rules" (PDF). Southern California Interdisciplinary Law Journal. 27: 133–164.
