= Hayti High School =

Location
- 500 North 4th Street; Hayti, Missouri; United States; 36.2384°N 89.7474°W

Information
- Type: public secondary
- School district: Hayti R-II School District
- Principal: Melanie Tipton
- Teaching staff: 21.75 (FTE)
- Grades: 9–12
- Enrollment: 221 (2023–2024)
- Student to teacher ratio: 10.16
- Campus: suburban
- Color
- Mascot: Indian
- Website: www.haytir2.org/high_school

Hayti High School is a high school located in Hayti, Missouri.

== Notable alumni ==
- William Moore, a former Missouri Tiger college safety. Now retired NFL strong safety from the NFL that spent his entire career with the Atlanta Falcons.
