= 2008 Iowa State Cyclones football team =

American college football season

2008 Iowa State Cyclones football
- Conference: Big 12 Conference
- North Division
- Record: 2–10 (0–8 Big 12)
- Head coach: Gene Chizik (2nd season)
- Offensive coordinator: Robert McFarland (2nd season)
- Offensive scheme: Multiple
- Defensive coordinator: Wayne Bolt (2nd season)
- Base defense: 4–3
- Home stadium: Jack Trice Stadium

2008 Big 12 Conference football standings
	Conf.			Overall
Team	W		L	W		L
North Division
No. 19 Missouri xy	5	–	3	10	–	4
Nebraska x	5	–	3	9	–	4
Kansas	4	–	4	8	–	5
Colorado	2	–	6	5	–	7
Kansas State	2	–	6	5	–	7
Iowa State	0	–	8	2	–	10
South Division
No. 5 Oklahoma xy$	7	–	1	12	–	2
No. 4 Texas x%	7	–	1	12	–	1
No. 12 Texas Tech x	7	–	1	11	–	2
No. 16 Oklahoma State	5	–	3	9	–	4
Baylor	2	–	6	4	–	8
Texas A&M	2	–	6	4	–	8
Championship: Oklahoma 62, Missouri 21
$ – BCS representative as conference champion; % – BCS at-large representative; x – Division champion/co-champions; y – Championship game participant; Rankings from AP Poll

The 2008 Iowa State Cyclones football team represented Iowa State University as a member of the North Division in the Big 12 Conference during the 2008 NCAA Division I FBS football season. Led by Gene Chizik in his second and final season as head coach, the Cyclones compiled an overall record of 2–10 with a mark of 0–8 in conference play, placing last out of six team in the Big 12's North Division. The team played home games at Jack Trice Stadium in Ames, Iowa.

== Schedule ==
Date	Time	Opponent	Site	TV	Result	Attendance
August 28	7:00 p.m.	South Dakota State*	Jack Trice Stadium; Ames, IA	FCS	W 44–17	46,617
September 6	6:00 p.m.	Kent State*	Jack Trice Stadium; Ames, IA		W 48–28	49,805
September 13	11:00 a.m.	at Iowa*	Kinnick Stadium; Iowa City, IA (rivalry)	BTN	L 5–17	70,585
September 20	8:00 p.m.	at UNLV*	Sam Boyd Stadium; Whitney, NV	Mtn	L 31–34 ^{OT}	25,567
October 4	11:30 a.m.	No. 16 Kansas	Jack Trice Stadium; Ames, IA	Versus	L 33–35	47,847
October 11	6:00 p.m.	at Baylor	Floyd Casey Stadium; Waco, TX	FCS	L 10–38	30,528
October 18	11:30 a.m.	Nebraska	Jack Trice Stadium; Ames, IA (rivalry)	Versus	L 7–35	48,794
October 25	6:00 p.m.	Texas A&M^{†}	Jack Trice Stadium; Ames, IA	FCS	L 35–49	45,495
November 1	2:30 p.m.	at No. 10 Oklahoma State	Boone Pickens Stadium; Stillwater, OK	ABC	L 17–59	46,718
November 8	12:30 p.m.	at Colorado	Folsom Field; Boulder, CO	Versus	L 24–28	46,440
November 15	5:30 p.m.	No. 11 Missouri	Jack Trice Stadium; Ames, IA (rivalry)	FSN	L 20–52	46,013
November 22	2:30 p.m.	at Kansas State	Bill Snyder Family Football Stadium; Manhattan, KS (rivalry)	FCS	L 30–38	41,266
*Non-conference game; ^{†}Homecoming; Rankings from Coaches' Poll released prior to the game; All times are in Central time

== Game summaries ==
=== South Dakota State ===
South Dakota State at Iowa State Cyclones

Team	1	2	3	4	Total
South Dakota State	0	0	3	14	17
• Iowa State	10	10	14	10	44

- Date: August 28
- Location: Jack Trice Stadium, Ames, IA
- Game start: 7:00 p.m. CST
- Game attendance: 46,617
- TV announcers (FCS): Dan McLaughlin (play-by-play) & Rich Baldinger (color)

=== Kent State ===
Kent State Golden Flashes at Iowa State Cyclones

Team	1	2	3	4	Total
Kent State	7	14	0	7	28
• Iowa State	21	7	10	10	48

- Date: September 6
- Location: Jack Trice Stadium, Ames, IA
- Game start: 6:00 p.m. CST
- Game attendance: 49,805

=== Iowa ===
Iowa State Cyclones at Iowa Hawkeyes

Team	1	2	3	4	Total
Iowa State	0	0	3	2	5
• Iowa	3	0	0	14	17

- Date: September 13
- Location: Kinnick Stadium, Iowa City, IA
- Game start: 11:00 a.m. CST
- Game attendance: 70,585
- TV announcers (BTN): Thom Brennaman (play-by-play), Charles Davis (color), & Charissa Thompson (sideline)

=== UNLV ===
Iowa State Cyclones at UNLV Rebels

Team	1	2	3	4	OT	Total
Iowa State	0	0	14	14	3	31
• UNLV	14	7	7	0	6	34

- Date: September 20
- Location: Sam Boyd Stadium, Whitney, NV
- Game start: 8:00 p.m. CST
- Game attendance: 25,567
- TV announcers (Mtn): Rich Cellini (play-by-play), Jon Berger (color), & Molly Sullivan (sideline)

=== Kansas ===
#16 Kansas Jayhawks at Iowa State Cyclones

Team	1	2	3	4	Total
• #16 Kansas	0	0	21	14	35
Iowa State	14	6	0	13	33

- Date: October 4
- Location: Jack Trice Stadium, Ames, IA
- Game start: 11:30 a.m. CST
- Game attendance: 47,847
- TV announcers (Versus): Ron Thulin (play-by-play) & Dale Hellestrae (color)

=== Baylor ===
Iowa State Cyclones at Baylor Bears

Team	1	2	3	4	Total
Iowa State	0	3	0	7	10
• Baylor	7	14	10	7	38

- Date: October 11
- Location: Floyd Casey Stadium, Waco, TX
- Game start: 6:00 p.m. CST
- Game attendance: 30,528
- TV announcers (FCS): Dan McLaughlin (play-by-play) & Rich Baldinger (color)

=== Nebraska ===
Nebraska Cornhuskers at Iowa State Cyclones

Team	1	2	3	4	Total
• Nebraska	7	14	0	14	35
Iowa State	0	0	7	0	7

- Date: October 18
- Location: Jack Trice Stadium, Ames, IA
- Game start: 11:30 a.m. CST
- Game attendance: 48,794
- Game weather: 55°, Sunny
- TV announcers (Versus): Ron Thulin (play-by-play), Glenn Parker (color), & Lindsay Soto (sideline)

=== Texas A&M ===
Texas A&M Aggies at Iowa State Cyclones

Team	1	2	3	4	Total
• Texas A&M	7	21	7	14	49
Iowa State	7	10	3	15	35

- Date: October 25
- Location: Jack Trice Stadium, Ames, IA
- Game start: 6:00 p.m. CST
- Game attendance: 45,495
- TV announcers (FCS): Dan McLaughlin (play-by-play) & Rich Baldinger (color)

=== #10 Oklahoma State ===
Iowa State Cyclones at #10 Oklahoma State Cowboys

Team	1	2	3	4	Total
Iowa State	7	3	0	7	17
• #10 Oklahoma State	14	14	24	7	59

- Date: November 1
- Location: Boone Pickens Stadium, Stillwater, OK
- Game start: 2:30 p.m. CST
- Game attendance: 46,718
- TV announcers (ABC): Ron Franklin (Play-by-play), Ed Cunningham (Color), & Jack Arute (Sideline)

=== Colorado ===
Iowa State Cyclones at Colorado Buffaloes

Team	1	2	3	4	Total
Iowa State	3	7	7	7	24
• Colorado	0	0	13	15	28

- Date: November 8
- Location: Folsom Field, Boulder, CO
- Game start: 12:30 p.m. CST
- Game attendance: 46,440
- TV announcers (Versus): Ron Thulin (play-by-play), Kelly Stouffer (color), & Lewis Johnson (sideline)

=== #11 Missouri ===
#11 Missouri Tigers at Iowa State Cyclones

Team	1	2	3	4	Total
• #11 Missouri	7	24	7	14	52
Iowa State	0	7	6	7	20

- Date: November 15
- Location: Jack Trice Stadium, Ames, IA
- Game start: 5:30 p.m. CST
- Game attendance: 46,013
- TV announcers (FSN): Joel Meyers (play-by-play), Gary Reasons (color), & Emily Jones (sideline)

=== Kansas State ===
Iowa State Cyclones at Kansas State Wildcats

Team	1	2	3	4	Total
Iowa State	7	10	0	13	30
• Kansas State	7	21	7	3	38

- Date: November 29
- Location: Bill Snyder Stadium, Manhattan, KS
- Game start: 2:30 p.m. CST
- Game attendance: 41,266
- TV announcers (FCS): Kevin Eschenfelder (play-by-play) & Rich Baldinger (color)

== Personnel ==
=== Coaching staff ===
Gene Chizik: head coach Robert McFarland: offensive coordinator Wayne Bolt: defensive coordinator Scott Fountain (TE/RC)

=== Roster ===
#	Player	Pos.
#1	Linder, Judah	DB
#2	Johnson, Sedrick	WR
#2	Smith, James	DB
#3	Bass, Jamicah	RB
#4	Arnaud, Austen	QB
#4	Sandvig, Zac	DB
#5	Sumrall, R.J.	WR
#6	Scales, Jason	RB
#7	Banks, Kennard	DB
#7	Bates, Phillip	QB
#8	Brown, Chris	DB
#8	Bueker, Brett	QB
#9	Messiah, Euseph	WR
#10	Bell, Cameron	LB
#10	Range, Lonzie	WR
#11	Singleton, Chris	DB
#11	Tiller, Jerome	QB
#12	Bell, Allen	DB
#13	Brandtner, Mike	P
#14	Bibbs, Michael	LB
#15	Jones, Houston	WR
#15	Land, Dustin	DB
#16	Kuehl, Daniel	PK
#16	Raven, Josh	LB
#17	McDowell, Devin	DB
#17	Zitek, Joel	WR
#18	Franklin, Wallace	WR
#19	Matthews, A.J.	DB
#20	Hunley, Brandon	DB

#	Player	Pos.
#20	Powell, Chad	P
#21	Mahoney, Grant	PK
#22	Harris, Jason	RB
#23	Johnson, Leonard	DB
#23	Schwartz, Jeremiah	RB
#24	Schmidgall, Derec	LB
#25	Frere, Nick	DL
#25	Guyer, Zach	PK
#26	Mansfield, Taylor	FB
#26	Moser, Seth	LB
#27	Johnson, Steve	DB
#27	Romey, Michael	PK
#29	Ekwelundu, Brian	FB
#29	Parker, Rashawn	DL
#31	Rumple, Justin	LB
#32	Benton, Ter'ran	DB
#32	Burke, Hunter	WR
#33	Robinson, Alexander	RB
#34	Harklau, Nick	DB
#34	Williams, Johnny	RB
#35	Cicciarelli, Joe	DB
#35	Ewald, Vince	TE
#36	Mulcahy, Patrick	WR
#36	Walker, Kyle	DB
#37	O'Connell, Michael	DB
#37	Zimmerman, Dakota	DS
#38	Campbell, Chris	WR
#38	Maggitt, Roosevelt	DL
#39	Thompson Jr., Rickey	RB

#	Player	Pos.
#40	Tucker, Zac	DS
#41	Ferguson, Ernest	LB
#42	Weymiller, Frank	LB
#43	Garrin, Fred	LB
#44	Hamlin, Kevin	LB
#45	Blaes, Joe	TE
#47	Taylor, Kurtis	DL
#48	Smith, Sean	OL
#49	Wonders, David	DS
#51	Haughton, Scott	OL
#52	Knapp, Mike	OL
#53	Vencil, Evan	OL
#54	Smith, Jesse	LB
#55	Lyle, Christopher	DE
#56	Weir, Chris	DL
#58	Hicks, Hayworth	OL
#59	Kaufman, Preston	LB
#60	Johnson, Brandon	OL
#61	Slobidsky, Nick	OL
#62	Frere, Nate	DL
#63	Lamaak, Ben	OL
#65	Steinbach, Patrick	OL
#66	Slifka, Kyle	DL
#67	Hulbert, Matt	OL
#68	Bergan, Tadd	OL
#70	Davis, Drew	OL
#71	Baysinger, Trey	OL
#72	Osemele, Kelechi	OL
#73	Stephens, Reggie	OL

#	Player	Pos.
#74	Vanstrom, Joe	OL
#75	Dedrick, Doug	OL
#77	Alvarez, Alex	OL
#78	Klerekoper, Joseph	OL
#79	Burris, Brayden	OL
#80	Darks, Darius	WR
#80	Tuetken, Todd	WR
#81	Carlson, Jason	WR
#81	Tate, Michael	DL
#82	Hamilton, Marquis	WR
#83	Ferguson, Travis	DE
#83	Williams, Jake	WR
#84	Catlett, Derrick	TE
#85	Johnson, Bailey	DL
#85	Lillie, Justin	WR
#86	Hammerschmidt, Kurt	TE
#87	Sandvig, Alex	WR
#88	Franklin, Collin	TE
#89	Mitchell, Andrew	WR
#90	Laing, Cleyon	DE
#91	Neal, Patrick	TE
#92	Black, Jerrod	DL
#93	Bykowski, Carter	TE
#94	McDonough, Jake	DE
#95	Zegers, Spenser	DL
#96	Alburtis, Austin	DL
#97	Ruempolhamer, Stephen	DL
#99	Hurtig, Chase	DL
