= 2008 Missouri Tigers football team =

American college football season

2008 Missouri Tigers football

Big 12 North Division co-champion Alamo Bowl champion

Big 12 Championship, L 21–62 vs. Oklahoma

Alamo Bowl, W 30–23 ^{OT} vs. Northwestern
- Conference: Big 12 Conference
- North Division

Ranking
- Coaches: No. 16
- AP: No. 19
- Record: 10–4 (5–3 Big 12)
- Head coach: Gary Pinkel (8th season)
- Offensive coordinator: Dave Christensen (8th season)
- Offensive scheme: Spread
- Defensive coordinator: Matt Eberflus (8th season)
- Base defense: 4–3
- Captains: Chase Daniel; Ziggy Hood; William Moore; Tommy Saunders
- Home stadium: Faurot Field (Capacity: 68,349)

2008 Big 12 Conference football standings
	Conf.			Overall
Team	W		L	W		L
North Division
No. 19 Missouri xy	5	–	3	10	–	4
Nebraska x	5	–	3	9	–	4
Kansas	4	–	4	8	–	5
Colorado	2	–	6	5	–	7
Kansas State	2	–	6	5	–	7
Iowa State	0	–	8	2	–	10
South Division
No. 5 Oklahoma xy$	7	–	1	12	–	2
No. 4 Texas x%	7	–	1	12	–	1
No. 12 Texas Tech x	7	–	1	11	–	2
No. 16 Oklahoma State	5	–	3	9	–	4
Baylor	2	–	6	4	–	8
Texas A&M	2	–	6	4	–	8
Championship: Oklahoma 62, Missouri 21
$ – BCS representative as conference champion; % – BCS at-large representative; x – Division champion/co-champions; y – Championship game participant; Rankings from AP Poll

The 2008 Missouri Tigers football team represented the University of Missouri in the 2008 NCAA Division I FBS football season. The team was coached by Gary Pinkel, who returned in his eighth season with Mizzou, and played their home games at Faurot Field at Memorial Stadium.

Quarterback Chase Daniel returned for his final year of eligibility and led the Tigers to a second appearance in the Big 12 Championship Game.

== Recruits ==
Key Losses:

- SS Cornelius "Pig" Brown
- WR William Franklin
- OT Tyler Luellen
- TE Martin Rucker
- C Adam Spieker
- RB Tony Temple

Five junior Tigers will return for the 2008 season after turning down the NFL Draft, including QB Chase Daniel, TE Chase Coffman, SS William Moore, Delaware Stryker Sulak and DT Ziggy Hood. The Tigers will have 16 returning starters, 10 on defense and six on offense.

Redshirt freshman DE John Stull was removed from the team on January 11, 2008, after being arrested on drug charges.

22 Recruits list.

College recruiting
Name	Hometown	School	Height	Weight	40^{‡}	Commit date
Jimmy Burge; DT	Houston, Texas	Stratford HS	6 ft 2 in (1.88 m)	275 lb (125 kg)	5.10	Jun 19, 2007
Jimmy Burge; DT	Recruit ratings: Scout: Rivals: (71)					
Taylor Davis; OT	Plano, Texas	Prestonwood Christian	6 ft 4 in (1.93 m)	261 lb (118 kg)	5.66	Aug 3, 2007
Taylor Davis; OT	Recruit ratings: Scout: Rivals: (70)					
Will Ebner; MLB	Friendswood, Texas	Friendswood HS	6 ft 0.5 in (1.84 m)	225 lb (102 kg)	4.61	Dec 17, 2007
Will Ebner; MLB	Recruit ratings: Scout: Rivals: (40)					
Kip Edwards; CB	Arlington, Texas	Bowie HS	6 ft 1 in (1.85 m)	180 lb (82 kg)	4.53	Oct 27, 2007
Kip Edwards; CB	Recruit ratings: Scout: Rivals: (40)					
Michael Egnew; WR	Plainview, Texas	Plainview HS	6 ft 5 in (1.96 m)	200 lb (91 kg)	N/A	Jun 10, 2007
Michael Egnew; WR	Recruit ratings: Scout: Rivals: (40)					
Blaine Gabbert; QB	Ballwin, Missouri	Parkway West HS	6 ft 5 in (1.96 m)	230 lb (100 kg)	4.60	Nov 10, 2007
Blaine Gabbert; QB	Recruit ratings: Scout: Rivals: (82)					
Zaviar Gooden; S	Pflugerville, Texas	Pflugerville HS	6 ft 1 in (1.85 m)	205 lb (93 kg)	4.50	Jan 22, 2008
Zaviar Gooden; S	Recruit ratings: Scout: Rivals: (40)					
Dan Hoch; OT	Harlan, Iowa	Harlan Community HS	6 ft 7 in (2.01 m)	315 lb (143 kg)	5.21	Jan 8, 2008
Dan Hoch; OT	Recruit ratings: Scout: Rivals: (76)					
Kenji Jackson; S	Mansfield, Texas	Mansfield HS	6 ft 1 in (1.85 m)	190 lb (86 kg)	N/A	Dec 18, 2007
Kenji Jackson; S	Recruit ratings: Scout: Rivals: (79)					
Daniel Jackson; OT	Gilmer, Texas	Gilmer HS	6 ft 4 in (1.93 m)	270 lb (120 kg)	N/A	Sep 10, 2007
Daniel Jackson; OT	Recruit ratings: Scout: Rivals: (74)					
Andrew Jones; TE	Smithville, Missouri	Smithville HS	6 ft 4.5 in (1.94 m)	234 lb (106 kg)	4.78	Mar 5, 2007
Andrew Jones; TE	Recruit ratings: Scout: Rivals: (79)					
Wes Kemp; WR	St. Louis, Missouri	DeSmet Jesuit HS	6 ft 4 in (1.93 m)	223 lb (101 kg)	4.60	Jan 7, 2008
Wes Kemp; WR	Recruit ratings: Scout: Rivals: (73)					
Brad Madison; DE	Bethany, Missouri	South Harrison HS	6 ft 5 in (1.96 m)	235 lb (107 kg)	N/A	Mar 12, 2007
Brad Madison; DE	Recruit ratings: Scout: Rivals: (75)					
Marcus Malbrough; DE	Beaumont, Texas	West Brook Sr. HS	6 ft 5 in (1.96 m)	230 lb (100 kg)	N/A	Jan 28, 2008
Marcus Malbrough; DE	Recruit ratings: Scout: Rivals: (40)					
Gahn McGaffie; RB	Galena Park, Texas	Galena Park HS	5 ft 10 in (1.78 m)	165 lb (75 kg)	N/A	Jun 15, 2007
Gahn McGaffie; RB	Recruit ratings: Scout: Rivals: (79)					
Travis Ruth; DT	Jefferson City, Missouri	Jefferson City HS	6 ft 2 in (1.88 m)	280 lb (130 kg)	N/A	Feb 7, 2007
Travis Ruth; DT	Recruit ratings: Scout: Rivals: (40)					
Aldon Smith; DE	Raytown, Missouri	Raytown HS	6 ft 6 in (1.98 m)	230 lb (100 kg)	N/A	Oct 7, 2007
Aldon Smith; DE	Recruit ratings: Scout: Rivals: (65)					
Jacquies Smith; DE	Dallas, Texas	South Oak Cliff HS	6 ft 4 in (1.93 m)	225 lb (102 kg)	N/A	Jan 24, 2008
Jacquies Smith; DE	Recruit ratings: Scout: Rivals: (75)					
Robert Steeples; CB	St. Louis, Missouri	DeSmet Jesuit HS	6 ft 1 in (1.85 m)	185 lb (84 kg)	4.53	Jun 16, 2007
Robert Steeples; CB	Recruit ratings: Scout: Rivals: (77)					
Drew Temple; RB	Kansas City, Missouri	Rockhurst HS	5 ft 9 in (1.75 m)	185 lb (84 kg)	N/A	Jul 20, 2007
Drew Temple; RB	Recruit ratings: Scout: Rivals: (69)					
George White; MLB	Cincinnati, Ohio	Harmony Community School	6 ft 2 in (1.88 m)	252 lb (114 kg)	N/A	Dec 18, 2007
George White; MLB	Recruit ratings: Scout: Rivals: (75)					
Rolandis Woodland; WR	Cincinnati, Ohio	Harmony Community School	6 ft 4 in (1.93 m)	205 lb (93 kg)	N/A	Feb 7, 2007
Rolandis Woodland; WR	Recruit ratings: Scout: Rivals: (40)					
Overall recruit ranking: Scout: 31 Rivals: 25
‡ Refers to 40-yard dash; Note: In many cases, Scout, Rivals, 247Sports, On3, and ESPN may conflict in their listings of height, weight and 40 time.; In these cases, the average was taken. ESPN grades are on a 100-point scale.; Sources: "Missouri 2008 Football Commitments". Rivals.; "2008 Missouri Commits". Scout.; "2008 Player Commitments – Missouri". ESPN.; "Scout.com Team Recruiting Rankings". Scout.; "2008 Team Ranking". Rivals.com.

Following their Cotton Bowl Classic victory, Mizzou landed a number of previously committed recruits from the state of Missouri. QB Blaine Gabbert from Ballwin, Missouri is the No. 1 rated prep player in the state of Missouri, and No. 1 rated pro-style quarterback in his recruiting class. and the Tigers landed him after he had previously committed to Nebraska. According to Rivals rankings, the Tigers also landed WR Wes Kemp (#5), TE Andrew Jones (#3), DE Alden Smith (#6) and RB Drew Temple (#11), brother of former Tigers player Tony Temple all from in-state high schools.

From out of state, the Tigers landed OT Dan Hoch, who like Gabbert previously committed to Nebraska.

== Schedule ==
Date	Time	Opponent	Rank	Site	TV	Result	Attendance
August 30	7:30 p.m.	vs. No. 20 Illinois*	No. 6	Edward Jones Dome; St. Louis, MO (rivalry)	ESPN	W 52–42	66,441
September 6	6:00 p.m.	Southeast Missouri State*	No. 6	Faurot Field; Columbia, Missouri	FSN PPV	W 52–3	62,305
September 13	11:30 a.m.	Nevada*	No. 6	Faurot Field; Columbia, MO	FSN	W 69–17	54,202
September 20	1:00 p.m.	Buffalo*	No. 5	Faurot Field; Columbia, MO		W 42–21	65,556
October 4	8:00 p.m.	at Nebraska	No. 4	Memorial Stadium; Lincoln, NE (rivalry)	ESPN	W 52–17	85,372
October 11	7:00 p.m.	No. 17 Oklahoma State	No. 3	Faurot Field; Columbia, MO	ESPN2	L 23–28	68,349
October 18	7:00 p.m.	at No. 1 Texas	No. 11	Darrell K Royal–Texas Memorial Stadium; Austin, TX (College GameDay)	ABC	L 31–56	98,383
October 25	5:30 p.m.	Colorado^{†}	No. 16	Faurot Field; Columbia, MO	FSN	W 58–0	68,349
November 1	2:00 p.m.	at Baylor	No. 14	Floyd Casey Stadium; Waco, TX		W 31–28	35,142
November 8	6:00 p.m.	Kansas State	No. 13	Faurot Field; Columbia, MO (Senior Night)	FSN	W 41–24	68,349
November 15	5:30 p.m.	at Iowa State	No. 12	Jack Trice Stadium; Ames, IA (rivalry)	FSN	W 52–20	46,013
November 29	11:30 a.m.	vs. Kansas	No. 12	Arrowhead Stadium; Kansas City, MO (Border War)	FSN	L 37–40	79,123
December 6	7:00 p.m.	vs. No. 4 Oklahoma	No. 19	Arrowhead Stadium; Kansas City, MO (Big 12 Championship Game) (rivalry)	ABC	L 21–62	71,004
December 29	7:00 p.m.	vs. No. 22 Northwestern*	No. 25	Alamodome; San Antonio, TX (Alamo Bowl)	ESPN	W 30–23 ^{OT}	55,986
*Non-conference game; ^{†}Homecoming; Rankings from AP Poll released prior to the game; All times are in Central time

== Game summaries ==
=== Illinois ===
	1	2	3	4	Total
#20/19 Illinois	6	7	15	14	42
#6/7 Missouri	7	24	14	7	52

In a close contest where Missouri held a big lead for most of the game, Illinois cuts it to within 10 near the end but gets no closer.

=== Southeast Missouri State ===
	1	2	3	4	Total
Southeast Missouri State	0	0	0	3	3
#6/7 Missouri	21	21	3	7	52

Missouri takes 42–0 lead over their FCS competition in their best defensive performance of the year, the first half showcased their offensive abilities. During the second half Missouri's backups played the entire second half.

=== Nevada ===
	1	2	3	4	Total
Nevada	7	10	0	0	17
#6/6 Missouri	17	21	21	10	69

Derrick Washington, Jeremy Maclin, and Jeff Wolfert scored for Missouri, and Colin Kaepernick rushed for a 1-yard touchdown for Nevada in the first quarter.

Chase Daniel passed to Jared Perry for 27 yards for a 2nd-quarter touchdown. Brett Jaekle kicked a field goal for Nevada, followed by Washington's 2-yard touchdown for Missouri. Maclin caught a pass (14 yards) from Daniel for Missouri, followed by a Kaepernick pass (42 yards) to Marko Mitchell for a Nevada touchdown.

Third quarter was all Missouri. Daniel passed to Maclin for a 49-yard touchdown, Tommy Saunders passed to Chase Coffman for a 32-yard touchdown and then Chase Paton rushed for a 3-yard touchdown. Jeff Wolfert kicked a 24-yard field goal for Missouri.

=== Buffalo ===
	1	2	3	4	Total
Buffalo	7	7	7	0	21
#5/5 Missouri	10	10	13	9	42

Missouri looked a bit flat at times against Buffalo but still won in commanding fashion.

=== At Nebraska ===
	1	2	3	4	Total
#4/3 Missouri	14	17	21	0	52
Nebraska	7	3	0	7	17

Chase Daniel threw three touchdown passes, Derrick Washington ran for 139 yards and scored three times, as Missouri mopped up Nebraska for their first road win against the Cornhuskers in 30 years (1978). The Tigers never had to punt all game.

The 35-point defeat was the Huskers' most lopsided home loss in 53 years.

=== Oklahoma State ===
	1	2	3	4	Total
#17/17 Oklahoma State	7	0	14	7	28
#3/2 Missouri	3	7	7	6	23

Oklahoma State handed Missouri their first loss as well as forced their first three and outs all year, giving teams a blueprint on how to slow down the Tigers' "video game offense" which looked unstoppable up to that point.

=== At Texas ===
	1	2	3	4	Total
#11/12 Missouri	0	3	14	14	31
#1/1 Texas	14	21	7	14	56

Sportscasters touted the 2005 contest with the Missouri Tigers as a showcase between two of the best dual-threat quarterbacks playing in college football, pitting Missouri quarterback Brad Smith against Vince Young of Texas. The two players combined for 582 yards total offense. Both Young and Smith led their respective team in rushing yards. Young had 108 rushing yards while Smith had 57. Young had 236 passing yards compared to Smith's 181. Texas won the game 51–20 to extend its series lead over Missouri to 15–5. The two teams did not face each other in 2006 or 2007.

Like the 2005 game, the 2008 matchup was billed as a battle between two great quarterbacks, Colt McCoy of Texas and Chase Daniel of Missouri having both been mentioned as possible Heisman Trophy candidates. Texas was playing their first home game as a number one ranked team since 1977. Missouri won their first five games of 2008 and had moved into third place in the nation before they were upset at home by the Oklahoma State Cowboys and fell to eleventh place. The Tigers came into the game with a 0–10 record against number-one ranked teams, and they had not won a football game in Austin since 1896.

To help ensure that the Longhorns did not dwell on the emotional victory over the Sooners one week earlier, the UT coaching staff called the team together and buried the TX/OU game ball in the UT practice field on the Monday before the game. The morning of the game the betting line on the morning of the game was Texas by 4 1/2 points; the over/under was 65. The temperature was 72 °F (22 °C) at kickoff, with clear skies. ESPN College GameDay was in Austin for the game, which set a new attendance record (UT, state of Texas, Big12 Conference) of 98,383.

Missouri won the coin toss and elected to receive the kickoff. They returned the ball to their 40 yard-line. On the first play from scrimmage, Missouri tried a reverse, but Texas dropped them for a loss and Missouri went three-and-out. Missouri had gone without a three-and-out for the whole season until having two during their loss the previous week against Oklahoma State. The Missouri punt rolled to the Texas 5-yard line. Colt McCoy led the Longhorns 95-yards for a touchdown.

Texas had the ball 5-times in the first half and scored a touchdown each time, taking a 35–0 lead. Missouri scored a field goal at the end of the first half to make the score 35–3. Texas was forced to punt on their first possession of the second half and Missouri scored a touchdown to narrow the lead to 35–10. Texas rebounded with a touchdown and Missouri was never able to cut the lead to less than 25 points. The final score was Texas-56, Missouri-31.

McCoy completed the game with 337 yards on 29-of-32 passing with two touchdowns, rushed for two more and at one point completed a school-record 17 passes in a row. His completion ratio of 79% coming into the game improved as he completed 91% of his passes in this game. His four touchdowns put him in first place for the most career touchdowns scored at Texas (82), passing Vince Young (81).

ESPN's recap of the game said, "And when McCoy dribbled the ball on the ground only to pick it up and throw a strike that kept the last drive of the half alive, he created the 'Did you just see that?' moment of the season so far. With one half of near-perfect football, Texas buried not only the remnants of the Sooners and the Tigers, but any doubt about who deserves to be No. 1. For now."

=== Colorado ===
Colorado at #16/16 Missouri

Team	1	2	3	4	Total
Colorado	0	0	0	0	0
• Missouri	21	13	14	10	58

- Date: Saturday, October 25
- Location: Faurot Field, Columbia, Missouri
- Game start: 6:40 p.m. EST
- Source: ESPN

Scoring summary
1	13:51	MIZZ	Derrick Washington 3-yard run (Jeff Wolfert kick)	MIZZ 7-0
1	10:48	MIZZ	Chase Coffman 1-yard pass from Chase Daniel (Jeff Wolfert kick)	MIZZ 14-0
1	3:20	MIZZ	Jeremy Maclin 3-yard pass from Chase Daniel (Jeff Wolfert kick)	MIZZ 21-0
2	8:10	MIZZ	Tommy Saunders 10-yard pass from Chase Daniel (Jeff Wolfert kick)	MIZZ 28-0
2	1:42	MIZZ	Jeff Wolfert 23-yard field goal	MIZZ 31-0
2	0:00	MIZZ	Jeff Wolfert 44-yard field goal	MIZZ 34-0
3	6:01	MIZZ	Danario Alexander 4-yard pass from Chase Daniel (Jeff Wolfert kick)	MIZZ 41-0
3	1:08	MIZZ	Jeremy Maclin 30-yard pass from Chase Daniel (Jeff Wolfert kick)	MIZZ 48-0
4	10:10	MIZZ	Jeff Wolfert 46-yard field goal	MIZZ 51-0
4	4:45	MIZZ	De'Vion Moore 55-yard run (Jeff Wolfert kick)	MIZZ 58-0

The Tigers won their 600th game since their inception in 1890, in an overwhelming 58–0 shutout of the Buffaloes in the Tigers' Homecoming game at Faurot Field rolling up 491 total offensive yards. Chase Daniel passed for 302 yards, and the runners ran for another 189 yards. Daniel was 31-for-37 throwing five touchdowns, intercepted once. Jeremy Maclin had 11 pass receptions for 134 yards with two touchdowns. The defense was outstanding, holding Colorado to a mere 41 net yards rushing and 158 passing for only 199 total offensive yards.

=== At Baylor ===
	1	2	3	4	Total
#14/14 Missouri	14	7	0	10	31
Baylor	0	7	14	7	28

Missouri barely scraped by Baylor that season.

=== Kansas State ===
	1	2	3	4	Total
Kansas State	0	3	7	14	24
#13/13 Missouri	7	17	3	14	41

Getting back on track, Missouri routed Kansas State coasting on a commanding 24–3 halftime lead.

=== At Iowa State ===
	1	2	3	4	Total
#12/11 Missouri	7	24	7	14	52
Iowa State	0	7	6	7	20

Iowa State put up very little resistance against the much better Missouri Tigers who played their backups for most of the second half.

=== Kansas (Border Showdown in Kansas City, Missouri) ===
	1	2	3	4	Total
Kansas	3	16	7	14	40
#12/11 Missouri	0	10	13	14	37

On November 30, offensive coordinator Dave Christensen accepted the job as head coach for the Wyoming Cowboys in 2009.

Kansas also got their revenge for having their perfect season ruined the previous year by handing the Tigers their third loss and all but guaranteeing they wouldn't play in a BCS bowl game unless they got a win over Oklahoma.

=== Oklahoma (Dr. Pepper Big 12 Championship in Kansas City, Missouri) ===
	1	2	3	4	Total
#19/17 Missouri	0	7	7	7	21
#2/4 Oklahoma	10	28	3	21	62

QB Chase Daniel became the Missouri career total offense yardage leader with 13,256. He entered the game with 12,988 yards and had 268 total yards (255 passing, 13 rushing) in the game. He moved ahead of Brad Smith (13,088) and had 13,256 at halftime. Senior CB Tru Vaughns made his first career start. PK Jeff Wolfert improved his career PAT mark to a perfect 182 of 182. TE Chase Coffman recorded his 30th career touchdown reception. He was already Missouri's all-time touchdown reception leader. Former walk-on WR Tommy Saunders moved into sixth place on the MU career receptions list. He finished the game with 144 to pass current Kansas City Chiefs' Will Franklin.

Jeremy Maclin leads all of major-college football in all-purpose yards per game with 203.54 (2,646 yds. in 13 G), over 20 yards more than second-place Jahvid Best (California).
He has 1,221 receiving, 987 kickoff return, 250 rushing, and 188 punt returns yardage.

On December 11, TE Chase Coffman won the prestigious John Mackey Tight End Award as the nation's top tight end.

Through 13 games in 2008, MU's offense ranks 4th in the nation in passing (340.38 ypg), 6th in total offense (497.46 ypg), 6th in scoring (43.15 ppg) and 8th in pass efficiency (162.69 rating).

On December 12, Pinkel said the new offensive coordinator will be present quarterbacks' coach and recruiting coordinator, David Yost.

=== Northwestern (16th Valero Alamo Bowl in San Antonio, Texas) ===
	1	2	3	4	OT	Total
#25/23 Missouri	0	10	10	3	7	30
#22/20 Northwestern	7	3	13	0	0	23

== Roster ==
2008 Missouri Tigers football roster (as of 9/3/08 MUTIGERS.com, and Rivals.com)
Wide receivers: 2 LaRoderick Thomas – Sophomore; 3 Gahn McGaffie – Freshman; 4 Jared Perry – Junior; 5 Rolandis Woodland – Freshman; 6 Sanford Gooden - (redshirt) Sophomore; 7 Earl Goldsmith – Senior; 8 Wes Kemp – Freshman; 9 Jeremy Maclin – (redshirt) Sophomore; 16 Brandon Gerau – Freshman; 28 Adam Casey – (redshirt) Senior; 29 Jerrell Jackson – Freshman; 36 Tyron Reece – Junior; 80 Terry Dennis – Freshman; 81 Danario Alexander – Junior; 84 Tommy Saunders – (redshirt) Senior; 88 Forrest Shock – (redshirt) Sophomore; 89 Blake May – (redshirt) Senior; Offensive line: 53 Travis Ruth – Freshman; 55 Daniel Jenkins – Freshman; 57 Brad Madison – Freshman; 58 Brendan Donaldson – Freshman; 61 Colin Brown – (redshirt) Senior; 62 Tim Barnes – (redshirt) Sophomore; 63 Ryan Schleusner – (redshirt) Junior; 65 Mike Prince – (redshirt) Sophomore; 66 Austin Wuebbels – Freshman; 67 J. T. Beasley – Freshman; 68 Dain Wise – (redshirt) Junior; 69 Kevin Mansco – Sophomore; 70 Lance Honeycutt – Freshman; 71 Jayson Palmgren – Freshman; 72 Elvis Fisher – Freshman; 73 Thomas Hellm – Sophomore; 75 John Gourley – Freshman; 76 Ryan Madison – (redshirt) Senior; 77 Dan Hoch – Freshman; 78 Kurtis Gregory – (redshirt) Junior; 79 Taylor Davis – Freshman; Tight ends: 17 Marvin Norman – Freshman; 43 Jon Gissinger – (redshirt) Junior; 45 Chase Coffman – Senior; 48 Caleb Medley – Freshman; 82 Michael Egnew – Freshman; 86 Beau Brinkley – Freshman; 87 Andrew Jones – Freshman; 93 Andy Loyd – (redshirt) Sophomore	Quarterbacks: 10 Chase Daniel – Senior; 11 Jimmy Costello – Freshman; 11 Blaine Gabbert – Freshman; 14 Chase Patton – (redshirt) Senior; Running (Tail) backs: 1 Jimmy Jackson – (redshirt) Senior; 17 Drew Temple – (redshirt) Freshman; 24 Derrick Washington – Sophomore; 26 Ryan Evans – Freshman; 26 De'Vion Moore – Freshman; 46 Shawn Scott – Junior; Defensive line: 2 Brian Coulter – Junior; 38 Stryker Sulak – (redshirt) Senior; 39 Tyler Crane – Sophomore; 48 Tommy Chavis – Senior; 59 Zach Milligan – (redshirt) Junior; 64 Joe Schumacher – Senior; 85 Aldon Smith – Freshman; 90 Dominique Hamilton – Freshman; 91 Jimmy Burge – Freshman; 92 Andy Maples – Junior; 93 Terrell Resonno – Freshman; 94 Ziggy Hood – Senior; 95 Chris Earnhardt – Freshman; 96 Jaron Baston – (redshirt) Junior; 97 Marcus Malbrough – Freshman; 98 Bart Coslet – (redshirt) Junior; 99 Jacquies Smith – Freshman; Linebackers: 5 Van Alexander – (redshirt) Senior; 6 Andrew Gachkar – Sophomore; 12 Sean Weatherspoon – Junior; 18 Steve Redmond – (redshirt) Senior; 25 Aaron O'Neal – (redshirt) Senior †; 30 Caleb Freeman – Freshman; 32 Will Ebner – Freshman; 33 Luke Lambert – Sophomore; 34 Brock Christopher – Senior; 35 Jeff Gettys – Junior; 45 Marlon Galbreath – (redshirt) Junior; 52 George White – Freshman; 54 Jared Culver – Freshman	Safety: 1 William Moore (redshirt) Senior; 8 Justin Garrett – Senior; 10 Gilbert Moye – Freshman; 14 Fred Trotman – Freshman; 24 Mack Breed – (redshirt) Senior; Strong Safety: 7 Munir Prince – Junior; Free Safety: 15 Del Howard – Junior; Defensive backs: 4 Hardy Ricks – (redshirt) Junior; 9 Kip Edwards – Freshman; 11 Tremane Vaughns – Senior; 13 Kenji Jackson – Freshman; 19 Carl Gettis – Sophomore; 20 Kevin Rutland – (redshirt) Sophomore; 21 Castine Bridges – (redshirt) Senior; 22 Robert Steeples – Freshman; 28 Evan Scott – Freshman; 31 Trey Hobson – Sophomore; 35 Matt Davis – (redshirt) Junior; 40 Zaviar Gooden – Freshman; Punters: 36 Jake Harry – Junior; Kickers: 91 Tanner Mills – Junior; 95 Grant Ressel – Freshman; 97 Trey Barrow – Freshman; 99 Jeff Wolfert – (redshirt) Senior
† Starter at position † LB Aaron O'Neal died on July 12, 2005, at 19, yet remains on the Tigers' roster for the remainder of his eligibility Player Bio: Aaron O'Neal - MISSOURI OFFICIAL ATHLETIC SITE MISSOURI OFFICIAL ATHLETIC SITE - Football

== Coaching staff ==
Name	Position	Years at MU	Alma mater (Year)
Gary Pinkel	Head coach	8	Kent State (1975)
Dave Christensen	Assistant head coach Offensive coordinator Quarterbacks; Offensive line	8	Western Washington (1985)
Matt Eberflus	Associate head coach Defensive coordinator Safeties	8	Toledo (1993)
Cornell Ford	Cornerbacks	8	Toledo (1991)
Andy Hill	Wide receivers	13	University of Missouri (1985)
Brian Jones	Running backs	8	Connecticut (1981)
Craig Kuligowski	Defensive line	8	Toledo (1991)
Dave Steckel	Linebackers	8	Kutztown (1982)
Bruce Walker	Tight ends Assistant offensive line	8	Central Washington (1983)
David Yost	Quarterbacks; Recruiting coordinator	8	Kent State (1992)
Barry Odom	Assistant AD for football operations	6	University of Missouri (1999)
Nick Otterbacher	Director of football recruiting	5	Toledo (2002)

Coaching staff from: "Missouri Tigers - 2008 Roster". CSTV.com. Archived from the original on January 1, 2008.

== Rankings ==
Ranking movements Legend: ██ Increase in ranking ██ Decrease in ranking ( ) = First-place votes
	Week																
Poll	Pre	1	2	3	4	5	6	7	8	9	10	11	12	13	14	15	Final
AP	6	6 (1)	6 (1)	5	6	4 (1)	3 (1)	11	16	14	14	12	12	12	19	25	19
Coaches	7	7	6	5	5	3	2	12	16	14	13	11	11	11	17	23	16
Harris	Not released					4 (1)	4	11	16	14	13	11	11	11	18	24	Not released
BCS	Not released								15	14	14	12	13	13	20	21	Not released

== Statistics ==
Statistics from: "Missouri Tigers – Cumulative Season Statistics". CSTV.com. December 31, 2008. Archived from the original on February 11, 2009.

=== Team ===
(to December 29, 2008)

	MU	Opp
SCORING	591	381
Points per Game	42.2	27.2
FIRST DOWNS	358	327
Rushing	100	110
Passing	235	199
Penalty	23	18
RUSHING YARDAGE	2,153	1,748
Gained	2,407	2,219
Lost	-254	-471
Attempts	417	510
Avg per Rush	5.2	3.4
Avg. per game	153.8	124.9
TDs Rushing	28	19
PASSING YARDAGE	4,625	4,013
Comp-Att-Int	404-565-18	374-583-14
Avg per Pass	8.2	6.9
Avg per Catch	11.4	10.7
Avg. per game	330.4	286.6
TDs Passing	41	29

	MU	Opp
TOTAL OFFENSE	6,778	5,761
Total plays	982	1,093
Avg. per play	6.9	5.3
Avg. per game	484.1	411.5
Fumbles-Lost	13-8	19-8
Penalties–yards	58-524	98-827
Avg. per game	37.4	59.1
Punts–yards	34-1,397	72-2,788
Avg per Punt	41.1	38.7
Net punt avg	37.7	32.9
Time of Possession/Game	26:08	33:31
3rd down conversions	87/163 (53%)	106/230 (46%)
4th down conversions	6/14 (43%)	14/27 (52%)
Sacks By–yards	33-254	16-94
Misc. Yards	14	0
Touchdowns Scored	76	50
Field goals–attempts-Long	20-27 (74%)	10-14 (71%)
On-Side Kicks	0-0	1-1
Red-Zone Scores	58-65 (89%)	36-50 (72%)
Red-Zone TDs	46-65 (71%)	29-50 (58%)
PAT–attempts	73-73 (100%)	47-49 (96%)
ATTENDANCE	387,120	264,910
Games / Avg. per game	6 / 64,520	4 / 66,228
Neutral Site		4 / 68,138

==== Scores by quarter ====
(through December 29, 2008)

	1	2	3	4	OT	Total
Missouri	121	191	147	125	7	591
Opponents	68	112	93	108	0	381

=== Offense ===
==== Rushing ====
(to December 29, 2008)

Name	GP-GS	Att	Gain	Loss	Net	Avg	TD	Long	Avg/G
Derrick Washington	14	177	1,078	42	1,036	5.9	17	59	74.0
Jeremy Maclin	14	40	306	13	293	7.3	2	56	20.9
Chase Daniel	14	69	384	103	281	4.1	1	48	20.1
Jimmy Jackson	14	59	275	28	247	4.2	6	37	17.6
De'Vion Moore	13	41	251	20	231	5.6	1	55	17.8
Blaine Gabbert	5	6	37	15	22	3.7	0	30	4.4
Shawn Scott	3	4	23	1	22	5.5	0	8	7.3
Tommy Saunders	14	3	14	0	14	4.7	0	8	1.0
Jerrell Jackson	13	2	11	1	10	5.0	0	11	0.8
Chase Patton	8	5	19	10	9	1.8	1	11	1.1
Danario Alexander	12	2	6	0	6	3.0	0	3	0.5
Tyrone Reece	2	3	3	5	-2	-0.7	0	3	-1.0
TEAM	11	4	0	8	-8	-2.0	0	0	-0.7
Jared Perry	14	2	0	8	-8	-4.0	0	0	-0.6
TOTAL	14	417	2,407	254	2,153	5.2	28	59	153.8
Opponents	14	510	2,219	471	1,748	3.4	19	93	124.9

==== Passing ====
(to December 29, 2008)

Name (G)	Effic	Cmp-Att-Int	Pct	Yds	TD	Lng	Avg/G
Chase Daniel (14)	159.44	385-528-18	72.9	4,335	39	80	309.6
Chase Patton (8)	176.47	12-18-0	66.7	196	1	48	24.5
Blaine Gabbert (5)	66.25	5-13-0	38.5	43	0	14	8.6
Tommy Saunders (14)	479.20	2-2-0	100.0	51	1	32	5.1
Chase Coffman (12)	0.00	0-1-0	0.0	0	0	0	0.0
Danario Alexander (12)	0.00	0-1-0	0.0	0	0	0	0.0
TEAM (11)	0.00	0-2-0	0.0	0	0	0	0.0
TOTAL (14)	157.84	404-565-18	71.5	4,625	41	80	330.4
Opponents (14)	133.58	374-583-14	64.2	4,013	29	65	286.6

==== Receiving ====
(to December 29, 2008)

Name	GP	No.	Yds	Avg	TD	Long	Avg/G
Jeremy Maclin	14	102	1,260	12.4	13	80	90.0
Chase Coffman	12	90	987	11.0	10	48	82.2
Tommy Saunders	14	72	833	11.6	7	69	59.5
Jared Perry	14	41	567	13.8	4	38	40.5
Derrick Washington	14	29	277	9.6	2	28	19.8
Danario Alexander	12	26	329	12.7	5	39	27.4
Andrew Jones	13	20	146	7.3	0	15	11.2
Jerrell Jackson	13	9	98	10.9	0	15	7.5
Earl Goldsmith	13	5	58	11.6	0	17	4.5
Michael Egnew	13	4	22	5.5	0	7	1.7
Jimmy Jackson	14	3	26	8.7	0	13	1.9
Wes Kemp	7	1	15	15.0	0	15	2.1
Jon Gissinger	14	1	10	10.0	0	10	0.7
Colin Brown	14	1	-3	-3.0	0	0	-0.2
TOTAL	14	404	4,625	11.4	41	80	330.4
Opponents	14	374	4,013	10.7	29	65	286.6

=== Field Goals / PAT ===
(to December 29, 2008)

Name	FG-FGA	Pct	01-19	20-29	30-39	40-49	50-99	Lng	Blkd	PAT	Pts.
Jeff Wolfert	20-27	74.1	1-1	5-5	6-7	7-9	1-5	51	2	73-73	133

=== Special teams ===
(to December 29, 2008)

Name	Punting								Kickoffs				
Name	No.	Yds	Avg	Long	TB	FC	I20	Blkd	No.	Yds	Avg	TB	OB
Jeff Wolfert	7	297	42.4	54	1	0	3	0	103	6,550	63.6	15	1
Jake Harry	26	1,057	40.7	55	3	5	10	0					
Grant Ressel	1	43	43.0	43	0	1	0	0					
Tanner Mills									3	203	67.7	0	0
TOTAL	34	1,397	41.1	55	4	6	13	0	106	6,753	63.7	15	1
Opponents	72	2,788	38.7	69	6	20	23	1	70	3,903	55.8	4	1

Name	Punt returns					Kick returns				
Name	No.	Yds	Avg	TD	Long	No.	Yds	Avg	TD	Long
Jeremy Maclin	23	270	11.7	1	75	42	1,010	24.0	1	99
Tommy Saunders	2	24	12.0	0	15					
Will Ebner	2	6	3.0	0	0					
Jimmy Jackson						10	119	11.9	0	22
Tru Vaughns						3	67	22.3	0	24
Jon Gissinger						3	26	8.7	0	12
Earl Goldsmith						2	22	11.0	0	15
Jeff Gettys						1	1	1.0	0	1
TOTAL	27	300	11.1	1	75	61	1,245	20.4	1	99
Opponents	11	35	3.2	0	11	88	2,018	22.9	1	97

=== Interceptions ===
(to December 29, 2008)

Name	No.	Yds	Avg	TD	Long
Sean Weatherspoon	3	100	33.3	2	65
Brock Christopher	3	39	13.0	1	22
Kenji Jackson	2	34	17.0	0	25
Jaron Baston	1	5	5.0	0	5
Castine Bridges	1	7	7.0	0	7
Kevin Rutland	1	12	12.0	0	12
Jeff Gettys	1	27	27.0	1	27
William Moore	1	17	17.0	1	17
Carl Gettis	1	27	27.0	0	27
TOTAL	14	268	19.1	5	65
Opponents	18	158	8.8	1	39

=== Fumble Returns ===
(to December 29, 2008)

Name	No.	Yds	Avg	TD	Long
Jaron Baston	1	18	18.0	0	18
TOTAL	1	18	18.0	0	18
Opponents	1	23	23.0	0	23

=== Defense ===
(to December 29, 2008)

Name	GP	Tackles				Sacks	Pass defense			Fumbles		Blkd Kick	Saf
Name	GP	Solo	Ast	Total	TFL-Yds	No.-Yds	Int-Yds.	BrUp	QBH	Rcv-Yds	FF	Blkd Kick	Saf
Sean Weatherspoon	14	76	79	155	18.5-75	5.0-46	3-100	7	6	-	2	-	-
Brock Christopher	14	51	54	105	7.5-20	1.0-6	3-39	6	3	1-0	-	-	-
Justin Garrett	14	51	38	89	1.5-3	-	-	6	3	-	-	-	-
William Moore	12	55	31	86	6.5-19	1.0-10	1-17	6	1	-	3	-	-
Carl Gettis	14	52	26	78	4.0-8	-	1-27	4	-	1-0	-	-	-
Castine Bridges	12	49	20	69	4.5-8	0.5-2	1-7	7	-	-	-	-	-
Kenji Jackson	13	40	22	62	-	-	2-34	1	-	-	1	-	-
Ziggy Hood	14	31	31	62	7.0-42	5.0-37	-	2	12	2-0	-	1	-
Luke Lambert	14	30	28	58	3.5-7	1.0-2	-	1	-	1-0	1	-	-
Stryker Sulak	14	29	26	55	15.5-106	10.5-94	-	6	6	-	6	1	-
Tru Vaughns	14	26	23	49	2.5-5	1.0-4	-	3	-	-	-	-	-
Jaron Baston	14	17	32	49	8.0-22	1.0-8	1-5	1	1	2-18	-	-	-
Jacquies Smith	14	22	24	46	3.0-6	1.0-3	-	2	2	-	-	-	-
Tommy Chavis	13	21	23	44	6.0-31	3.0-20	-	2	6	-	2	-	-
Del Howard	13	22	19	41	-	-	-	1	-	-	-	-	-
Hardy Ricks	14	26	13	39	1.5-6	-	-	-	1	-	-	-	-
Brian Coulter	12	13	16	29	6.5-44	3.0-22	-	2	1	-	2	-	-
Andrew Gachkar	14	13	15	28	1.0-2	-	-	1	-	-	-	-	-
Kevin Rutland	14	16	9	25	-	-	1-12	5	-	1-0	-	-	-
Will Ebner	14	15	6	21	3.0-20	-	-	-	1	-	-	1	-
Dominique Hamilton	13	8	10	18	0.5-0	-	-	1	-	-	1	-	-
Chris Earnhardt	7	7	10	17	1.0-4	-	-	-	2	-	-	-	-
Trey Hobson	12	10	6	16	1.0-1	-	-	1	-	-	-	-	-
Terrell Resonno	14	7	6	13	1.0-2	-	-	-	1	-	-	-	-
TEAM	11	4	7	11	-	-	-	1	-	-	-	-	1
Van Alexander	8	2	5	7	-	-	-	-	-	-	-	-	-
Jeff Gettys	14	5	1	6	-	-	1-27	-	-	-	-	-	-
Others (17)	14	11	13	24	-	-	-	-	-	-	-	-	-
TOTAL	14	709	593	1,302	103-431	33- 254	14-268	66	46	8-18	18	3	1
Opponents	14	510	526	1,036	77-250	16- 94	18-158	38	16	8-23	9	2	1
