= 2008 Oklahoma State Cowboys football team =

American college football season

2008 Oklahoma State Cowboys football

Holiday Bowl, L 31–42 vs. Oregon
- Conference: Big 12 Conference
- South

Ranking
- Coaches: No. 18
- AP: No. 16
- Record: 9–4 (5–3 Big 12)
- Head coach: Mike Gundy (4th season)
- Offensive coordinator: Gunter Brewer (1st season)
- Co-offensive coordinator: Trooper Taylor (1st season)
- Offensive scheme: Spread option
- Defensive coordinator: Tim Beckman (2nd season)
- Base defense: 4–3
- Home stadium: Boone Pickens Stadium

Uniform

2008 Big 12 Conference football standings
	Conf.			Overall
Team	W		L	W		L
North Division
No. 19 Missouri xy	5	–	3	10	–	4
Nebraska x	5	–	3	9	–	4
Kansas	4	–	4	8	–	5
Colorado	2	–	6	5	–	7
Kansas State	2	–	6	5	–	7
Iowa State	0	–	8	2	–	10
South Division
No. 5 Oklahoma xy$	7	–	1	12	–	2
No. 4 Texas x%	7	–	1	12	–	1
No. 12 Texas Tech x	7	–	1	11	–	2
No. 16 Oklahoma State	5	–	3	9	–	4
Baylor	2	–	6	4	–	8
Texas A&M	2	–	6	4	–	8
Championship: Oklahoma 62, Missouri 21
$ – BCS representative as conference champion; % – BCS at-large representative; x – Division champion/co-champions; y – Championship game participant; Rankings from AP Poll

The 2008 Oklahoma State Cowboys football team represented Oklahoma State University during the 2008 NCAA Division I FBS football season.

== Schedule ==
Date	Time	Opponent	Rank	Site	TV	Result	Attendance	Source
August 30	2:30 p.m.	at Washington State*		Qwest Field; Seattle, WA	FSN	W 39–13	50,830	
September 6	6:05 p.m.	Houston*		Boone Pickens Stadium; Stillwater, OK		W 56–37	45,001	
September 13	12:05 p.m.	Missouri State*		Boone Pickens Stadium; Stillwater, OK	FCS	W 57–13	43,388	
September 27	6:05 p.m.	Troy*		Boone Pickens Stadium; Stillwater, OK		W 55–24	52,463	
October 4	6:05 p.m.	Texas A&M	No. 21	Boone Pickens Stadium; Stillwater, OK		W 56–28	51,147	
October 11	7:00 p.m.	at No. 3 Missouri	No. 17	Faurot Field; Columbia, MO	ESPN2	W 28–23	68,349	
October 18	2:00 p.m.	Baylor^{†}	No. 8	Boone Pickens Stadium; Stillwater, OK		W 34–6	50,080	
October 25	2:30 p.m.	at No. 1 Texas	No. 7	Darrell K Royal–Texas Memorial Stadium; Austin, TX	ABC	L 24–28	98,518	
November 1	2:30 p.m.	Iowa State	No. 9	Boone Pickens Stadium; Stillwater, OK	ABC	W 59–17	46,718	
November 8	7:00 p.m.	at No. 2 Texas Tech	No. 8	Jones AT&T Stadium; Lubbock, TX	ABC	L 20–56	55,663	
November 15	7:00 p.m.	at Colorado	No. 11	Folsom Field; Boulder, CO	ABC	W 30–17	46,092	
November 29	7:00 p.m.	No. 3 Oklahoma	No. 11	Boone Pickens Stadium; Stillwater, OK (Bedlam Series, College GameDay)	ABC	L 41–61	49,031	
December 30	7:00 p.m.	vs. No. 15 Oregon*	No. 13	Qualcomm Stadium; San Diego, CA (Holiday Bowl)	ESPN	L 31–42	59,108	
*Non-conference game; ^{†}Homecoming; Rankings from AP Poll released prior to the game; All times are in Central time

== Game summaries ==
=== Washington State ===
Oklahoma State vs. Washington State Washington State

Team	1	2	3	4	Total
• Oklahoma State	3	12	10	14	39
Washington State	0	0	6	7	13

- Date: August 30, 2008
- Location: Qwest Field, Seattle, WA
- Game start: 2:30 p.m. CST
- Game attendance: 50,830
- TV announcers: Brian Davis, Tony Boselli, Dain Blanton

=== Houston ===
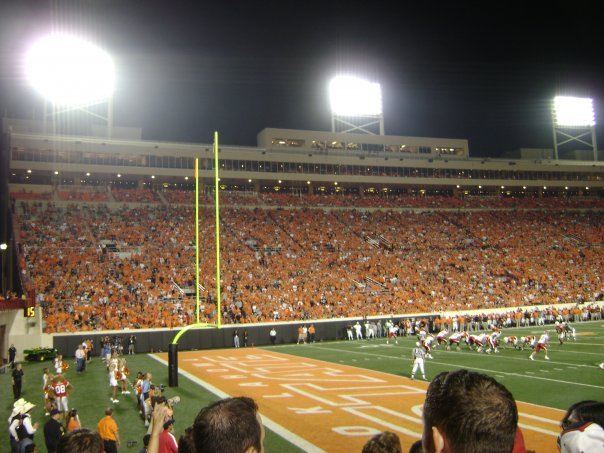
The Cowboys face off against the Houston Cougars at Boone Pickens Stadium on September 8, 2008

Oklahoma State vs. Houston Houston

Team	1	2	3	4	Total
Houston	7	9	7	14	37
• Oklahoma State	7	7	28	14	56

- Date: September 6, 2008
- Location: Boone Pickens Stadium, Stillwater, Oklahoma
- Game start: 6:05 p.m. CST
- Game attendance: 45,001

=== Missouri State ===
Oklahoma State vs. Missouri State Missouri State

Team	1	2	3	4	Total
Missouri State	3	3	7	0	13
• Oklahoma State	22	14	21	0	57

- Date: September 13, 2008
- Location: Boone Pickens Stadium, Stillwater, Oklahoma
- Game start: 12:05 CST
- Game attendance: 43,338
- TV announcers: Kevin Eschenfelder, Richard Baldinger

=== Troy ===
Oklahoma State vs. Trojans Troy

Team	1	2	3	4	Total
Troy	0	10	7	7	24
• Oklahoma State	14	21	10	10	55

- Date: September 27, 2008
- Location: Boone Pickens Stadium, Stillwater, Oklahoma
- Game start: 6:05 p.m. CST
- Game attendance: 52,463 (school record)

=== Texas A&M ===
#21 Oklahoma State vs. Texas A&M Texas A&M

Team	1	2	3	4	Total
Texas A&M	7	0	7	14	28
• No. 21 Oklahoma State	21	7	14	14	56

- Date: October 4, 2008
- Location: Boone Pickens Stadium, Stillwater, Oklahoma
- Game start: 6:05 p.m. CST
- Game attendance: 51,147

=== Missouri ===
#17 Oklahoma State vs. Missouri #3 Missouri

Team	1	2	3	4	Total
• No. 17 Oklahoma State	7	0	14	7	28
No. 3 Missouri	3	7	7	6	23

- Date: October 11, 2008
- Location: Faurot Field at Memorial Stadium, Columbia, Missouri
- Game start: 7:00 CST
- Game attendance: 68,349
- TV announcers: Mark Jones, Bob Davie, Erin Andrews

=== Baylor ===
#8 Oklahoma State vs. Baylor Baylor

Team	1	2	3	4	Total
Baylor	6	0	0	0	6
• No. 8 Oklahoma State	7	21	6	0	34

- Date: October 18, 2008
- Location: Boone Pickens Stadium, Stillwater, Oklahoma
- Game start: 2:00 CST
- Game attendance: 50,080

=== Texas ===
#7 Oklahoma State vs. Texas #1 Texas

Team	1	2	3	4	Total
No. 7 Oklahoma State	0	14	7	3	24
• No. 1 Texas	7	14	7	0	28

- Date: October 25, 2008
- Location: Darrel K. Royal-Texas Memorial Stadium, Austin, Texas
- Game start: 2:30 p.m. CST
- Game attendance: 98,518
- TV announcers: Brad Nessler, Bob Griese, Paul Maguire, Stacey Dales

=== Iowa State ===
#9 Oklahoma State vs. Iowa State Iowa State

Team	1	2	3	4	Total
Iowa State	7	3	0	7	17
• No. 9 Oklahoma State	14	14	24	7	59

- Date: November 1, 2008
- Location: Boone Pickens Stadium, Stillwater, Oklahoma
- Game start: 2:30 pm CST
- Game attendance: 46,718
- TV announcers: Ron Franklin, Ed Cunningham, Jack Arute

=== Texas Tech ===
#8 Oklahoma State vs. Texas Tech #2 Texas Tech

Team	1	2	3	4	Total
No. 8 Oklahoma State	7	7	6	0	20
• No. 2 Texas Tech	14	14	14	14	56

- Date: November 8, 2008
- Location: Jones AT&T Stadium, Lubbock, Texas
- Game start: 7:00 p.m. CST
- Game attendance: 55,663
- TV announcers: Brent Musburger, Kirk Herbstreit, Lisa Salters

=== Colorado ===
#11 Oklahoma State vs. Colorado Colorado

Team	1	2	3	4	Total
• No. 11 Oklahoma State	6	7	14	3	30
Colorado	0	3	7	7	17

- Date: November 15, 2008
- Location: Folsom Field, Boulder, Colorado
- Game start: 7:00 p.m. CST
- Game attendance: 46,092
- TV announcers: Ron Franklin, Ed Cunningham, Jack Arute

=== Oklahoma ===
#11 Oklahoma State vs. Oklahoma #3 Oklahoma

Team	1	2	3	4	Total
No. 3 Oklahoma	7	14	7	7	35
• No. 11 Oklahoma State	21	10	13	15	59

- Date: November 29, 2008
- Location: Boone Pickens Stadium, Stillwater, Oklahoma
- Game start: 7:00 CST
- Game attendance: 49,031
- TV announcers: Brent Musburger, Kirk Herbstreit, Lisa Salters

=== 2008 Holiday Bowl ===
#13 Oklahoma State vs. Oregon #15 Oregon

Team	1	2	3	4	Total
No. 13 Oklahoma State	17	0	7	7	31
• No. 15 Oregon	7	0	21	14	42

- Date: December 30, 2008
- Location: Qualcomm Stadium, San Diego, California
- Game start: 7:00 p.m. CST
- Game attendance: 59,108
- TV announcers: Chris Fowler, Jesse Palmer, Craig James, Erin Andrews/Joe Tessitore, Rod Gilmore, Dave Ryan

== Rankings ==
Ranking movements Legend: ██ Increase in ranking ██ Decrease in ranking — = Not ranked RV = Received votes
	Week																
Poll	Pre	1	2	3	4	5	6	7	8	9	10	11	12	13	14	15	Final
AP	—	RV	RV	RV	RV	21	17	8	7	9	8	11	11	11	14	13	16
Coaches	RV	RV	RV	RV	RV	22	17	10	8	10	8	13	12	12	15	14	18
Harris	Not released					23	17	10	8	9	8	13	13	12	14	13	Not released
BCS	Not released								6	9	9	13	12	12	14	13	Not released

== Statistics ==
=== Team ===
	Team	Opp
Scoring	499	323
Points per game	41.6	26.9
First downs		
Rushing		
Passing		
Penalty		
Total offense		
Avg per play		
Avg per game		
Fumbles-Lost		
Penalties-Yards		
Avg per game		

	Team	Opp
Punts-Yards		
Avg per punt		
Time of possession/Game		
3rd down conversions		
4th down conversions		
Touchdowns scored		
Field goals-Attempts-Long		
PAT-Attempts		
Attendance	337,828	319,452
Games/Avg per Game	7/48,261	5/63,890

==== Scores by quarter ====
	1	2	3	4	Total
Cowboys	128	134	174	94	530
Opponents	68	77	106	114	365

=== Offense ===
==== Rushing ====
Name	GP	Att	Gain	Loss	Net	Avg	TD	Long	Avg/G
Kendall Hunter	13	241	1544	0	1544	6.4	16	68	118.8 ypg
Keith Toston	13	102	686	0	686	6.7	9	56	52.8 ypg

==== Passing ====
Name	GP-GS	Effic	Cmp-Att-Int	Pct	Yds	TD	Lng	Avg/G
Zac Robinson	13-13	166.86	204-314-10	65	3065	25	95	235.8 ypg
Alex Cate	2-0	174.08	4-5-0	66.7	56	0	29	28 ypg

==== Receiving ====
Name	GP	No.	Yds	Avg	TD	Long	Avg/G
Dez Bryant	12	87	1481	17	19	80	123.4 ypg
Kendall Hunter	13	24	198	9	1	31	15.2 ypg

=== Defense ===
Name	GP	Tackles				Sacks	Pass defense			Fumbles		Blkd Kick	Saf
Name	GP	Solo	Ast	Total	TFL-Yds	No-Yds	Int-Yds	BrUp	QBH	Rcv-Yds	FF	Blkd Kick	Saf
Total													
Opponents													

=== Special teams ===
Name	Punting									Kickoffs				
Name	No.	Yds	Avg	Long	TB	FC	I20	50+	Blkd	No.	Yds	Avg	TB	OB
Total														

Name	Punt returns					Kick returns				
Name	No.	Yds	Avg	TD	Long	No.	Yds	Avg	TD	Long
Total										

== Awards ==
- Matt Fodge won the 2008 Ray Guy Award
- First Team All-American: Kendall Hunter, Dez Bryant(consensus), Perrish Cox
- All-Big 12: Dez Bryant (1st team), Kendall Hunter (1st), Russell Okung (1st), Matt Fodge (2nd), Andre Sexton (2nd), Jacob Lacey (2nd)
- Big 12 Special Teams Player of the Year: Dez Bryant

== 2008 team players in the NFL ==
The following players were drafted into professional football following the season.

Player	Position	Round	Pick	Franchise
Brandon Pettigrew	Tight end	1	20	Detroit Lions

The following Cowboys were signed as undrafted free agents:

- Jacob Lacey was signed by the Indianapolis Colts.
- Ricky Price was signed by the Kansas City Chiefs.
