= 2008 Baylor Bears football team =

American college football season

2008 Baylor Bears football
- Conference: Big 12 Conference
- South Division
- Record: 4–8 (2–6 Big 12)
- Head coach: Art Briles (1st season)
- Co-offensive coordinators: Randy Clements (1st season); Philip Montgomery (1st season)
- Offensive scheme: Veer and shoot
- Defensive coordinator: Brian Norwood (1st season)
- Base defense: 4–3
- Captain: Game captains
- Home stadium: Floyd Casey Stadium

2008 Big 12 Conference football standings
	Conf.			Overall
Team	W		L	W		L
North Division
No. 19 Missouri xy	5	–	3	10	–	4
Nebraska x	5	–	3	9	–	4
Kansas	4	–	4	8	–	5
Colorado	2	–	6	5	–	7
Kansas State	2	–	6	5	–	7
Iowa State	0	–	8	2	–	10
South Division
No. 5 Oklahoma xy$	7	–	1	12	–	2
No. 4 Texas x%	7	–	1	12	–	1
No. 12 Texas Tech x	7	–	1	11	–	2
No. 16 Oklahoma State	5	–	3	9	–	4
Baylor	2	–	6	4	–	8
Texas A&M	2	–	6	4	–	8
Championship: Oklahoma 62, Missouri 21
$ – BCS representative as conference champion; % – BCS at-large representative; x – Division champion/co-champions; y – Championship game participant; Rankings from AP Poll

The 2008 Baylor Bears football team represented Baylor University in the 2008 NCAA Division I FBS football season. The team was led by head coach Art Briles in his first year in the position. They played their home games at Floyd Casey Stadium in Waco, Texas.

== Preseason ==
Two Baylor players, linebacker Joe Pawelek and defensive back Jordan Lake, made the preseason All-Big 12 team. Pawelek made at least 86 tackles in each of the previous two seasons, while Lake posted 120 tackles, two interceptions, forced two fumbles, and recovered two in 2007. Lake was Baylor's only all-Big 12 postseason selection in 2007.

The Bears returned 15 starters, including 9 on offense, and 6 on defense.

In their preseason countdown, Rivals.com ranked the Bears' 2008 squad 92nd out of all 120 Division I FBS teams. The official Big 12 media preseason poll picked the Bears to finish last in the Big 12 South.

== Coaching staff ==
- Art Briles — Head Coach
- Randy Clements — Co-Offensive Coordinator (Line)
- Philip Montgomery — Co-Offensive Coordinator (QBs & RBs)
- Brian Norwood — Defensive Coordinator
- Chris Achuff — Assistant Coach (Defensive tackles)
- Dino Babers — Assistant Coach (WR)/Recruiting Coordinator
- Kendal Briles — Assistant Coach (Receivers)
- Larry Hoefer — Assistant Coach (Linebackers)
- Kaz Kazadi — Head Strength Coach
- Kim McCloud — Assistant Coach (Cornerbacks)
- Theo Young — Assistant Coach (Defensive ends)

== Schedule ==
Date	Time	Opponent	Site	TV	Result	Attendance
August 30	7:00 p.m.	No. 23 Wake Forest*	Floyd Casey Stadium; Waco, Texas	FSN	L 13–41	30,633
September 6	6:00 p.m.	Northwestern State*	Floyd Casey Stadium; Waco, Texas		W 51–6	36,258
September 12	7:30 p.m.	Washington State*	Floyd Casey Stadium; Waco, Texas		W 45–17	25,595
September 19	11:00 p.m.	at Connecticut*	Rentschler Field; East Hartford, Connecticut	ESPN2	L 28–31	38,870
October 4	11:30 a.m.	No. 1 Oklahoma	Floyd Casey Stadium; Waco, Texas	FSN	L 17–49	37,145
October 11	6:00 p.m.	Iowa State	Floyd Casey Stadium; Waco, Texas	FCS	W 38–10	30,528
October 18	2:00 p.m.	at No. 10 Oklahoma State	Boone Pickens Stadium; Stillwater, Oklahoma		L 6–34	50,080
October 25	11:30 a.m.	at Nebraska	Memorial Stadium; Lincoln, Nebraska	Versus	L 20–32	85,104
November 1	3:00 p.m.	No. 14 Missouri^{†}	Floyd Casey Stadium; Waco, Texas		L 28–31	35,142
November 8	11:00 a.m.	at No. 7 Texas	Darrell K Royal–Texas Memorial Stadium; Austin, Texas (rivalry)	FSN	L 21–45	97,715
November 15	3:05 p.m.	Texas A&M	Floyd Casey Stadium; Waco, Texas (Battle of the Brazos)		W 41–21	43,549
November 29	2:30 p.m.	at No. 7 Texas Tech	Jones AT&T Stadium; Lubbock, Texas (rivalry)	Versus	L 28–35	53,470
*Non-conference game; ^{†}Homecoming; Rankings from Coaches' Poll released prior to the game; All times are in Central time

== Game summaries ==
=== Washington State ===
Team	1	2	3	4	Total
Washington State	7	7	0	3	17
• Baylor	14	14	7	10	45

- Date: September 12
- Location: Floyd Casey Stadium, Waco, Texas
- Game start: 7:30 p.m. CDT
- TV announcers (Fox College Sports Central/FSN Southwest): John Morris, J.J. Joe

Scoring summary
1	11:27	Washington St	Chantz Staden 1-yard run (Nico Grasu kick)	Washington St 7-0
1	7:53	Baylor	Robert Griffin III 1-yard run (Ben Parks kick)	Tie 7-7
1	6:50	Baylor	Ernest Smith 27-yard pass from Robert Griffin III (Ben Parks kick)	Baylor 14-7
2	8:00	Washington St	Kevin Lopina 8-yard run (Nico Grasu kick)	Tie 14-14
2	7:32	Baylor	Jeremy Sanders 13-yard run (Ben Parks kick)	Baylor 21-14
2	5:12	Baylor	Jay Finley 46-yard run (Ben Parks kick)	Baylor 28-14
3	8:47	Baylor	Robert Griffin III 58-yard run (Ben Parks kick)	Baylor 35-14
4	14:54	Baylor	Kendall Wright 10-yard run (Ben Parks kick)	Baylor 42-14
4	10:42	Washington St	Nico Grasu 31-yard field goal	Baylor 42-17
4	6:21	Baylor	Ben Parks 23-yard field goal	Baylor 45-17

== Postseason ==
Three Baylor players—Jason Smith, Jordan Lake, and Joe Pawelek—made the All-Big 12 first team. Derek Epperson and Dan Gay received honorable mention, while Robert Griffin III was named Offensive Freshman of the Year. Griffin became Baylor's second Big 12 individual award winner, joining Daniel Sepulveda, who won Big 12 Special Teams Player of the Year in 2006.
