= 2008 Colorado Buffaloes football team =

American college football season

2008 Colorado Buffaloes football
- Conference: Big 12 Conference
- North
- Record: 5–7 (2–6 Big 12)
- Head coach: Dan Hawkins (3rd season)
- Offensive coordinator: Mark Helfrich (3rd season)
- Offensive scheme: Multiple
- Defensive coordinator: Ron Collins (3rd season)
- Base defense: 4–3 Cover 2
- Home stadium: Folsom Field

Uniform

2008 Big 12 Conference football standings
	Conf.			Overall
Team	W		L	W		L
North Division
No. 19 Missouri xy	5	–	3	10	–	4
Nebraska x	5	–	3	9	–	4
Kansas	4	–	4	8	–	5
Colorado	2	–	6	5	–	7
Kansas State	2	–	6	5	–	7
Iowa State	0	–	8	2	–	10
South Division
No. 5 Oklahoma xy$	7	–	1	12	–	2
No. 4 Texas x%	7	–	1	12	–	1
No. 12 Texas Tech x	7	–	1	11	–	2
No. 16 Oklahoma State	5	–	3	9	–	4
Baylor	2	–	6	4	–	8
Texas A&M	2	–	6	4	–	8
Championship: Oklahoma 62, Missouri 21
$ – BCS representative as conference champion; % – BCS at-large representative; x – Division champion/co-champions; y – Championship game participant; Rankings from AP Poll

The 2008 Colorado Buffaloes football team represented the University of Colorado at Boulder in the 2008 NCAA Division I FBS football season. The team was coached by Dan Hawkins and played their home games in Folsom Field.

== Schedule ==
Date	Time	Opponent	Site	TV	Result	Attendance	Source
August 31	5:30 pm	vs. Colorado State*	Invesco Field at Mile High; Denver, CO (Rocky Mountain Showdown)	FSN	W 38–17	69,619	
September 6	1:30 pm	Eastern Washington*	Folsom Field; Boulder, CO		W 31–24	46,417	
September 18	6:30 pm	No. 21 West Virginia*	Folsom Field; Boulder, CO	ESPN	W 17–14 ^{OT}	51,883	
September 27	1:30 pm	Florida State*	Jacksonville Municipal Stadium; Jacksonville, FL (River City Showdown)	ABC, ESPN	L 21–39	46,716	
October 4	5:00 pm	No. 5 Texas^{†}	Folsom Field; Boulder, CO	FSN	L 14–38	53,927	
October 11	10:30 am	at No. 16 Kansas	Memorial Stadium; Lawrence, KS	ESPN2	L 14–30	49,566	
October 18	5:00 pm	Kansas State	Folsom Field; Boulder, CO (rivalry)	FSN	W 14–13	52,099	
October 25	5:30 pm	at No. 16 Missouri	Faurot Field; Columbia, MO	FSN	L 0–58	68,349	
November 1	12:00 pm	at Texas A&M	Kyle Field; College Station, TX		L 17–24	78,121	
November 8	12:30 pm	Iowa State	Folsom Field; Boulder, CO	Versus	W 28–24	46,440	
November 15	6:00 pm	No. 11 Oklahoma State	Folsom Field; Boulder, CO	ABC	L 17–30	46,092	
November 28	1:30 pm	at Nebraska	Memorial Stadium; Lincoln, NE (rivalry)	ABC	L 31–40	85,319	
*Non-conference game; ^{†}Homecoming; Rankings from AP Poll released prior to the game; All times are in Mountain time

== Preseason ==
Riar Geer was suspended from all football-related activities after being arrested on suspicion of second-degree assault and harassment on March 15, 2008. This was less than 24 hours after Lynn Katoa was arrested March 14, 2008 on suspicion for assault at a party on February 16, 2008. This now makes four football players that have had charges brought against them this year. On January 19, 2008, Kai Maiava was ticketed with underage possession and consumption of alcohol and Nate Vaiomounga was charged the same night for criminal mischief under $500. Vaiomounga was also charged February 16, 2008 with underage possession and consumption of alcohol for a separate incident. On April 13, 2008, Jake Duren was arrested for first-degree criminal trespass and kicked off the team 4 hours later. Durin was found bloody and passed out after police followed a blood trail from a broken car window to him in the Smiley Court family residence hall where he did not live.

=== Spring practice ===
The Spring game was April 19, 2008. On the day before, Colorado was one of twenty schools competing in a Gridiron Bash where the Counting Crows will perform. The event was canceled weeks before hand due to NCAA rules on student athlete benefits. Former Colorado head coach Bill McCartney issued a challenge to Buffalo fans and students to fill Folsom Field for the spring game during a luncheon about CU football recruiting. Filling the stadium would make a statement of support from the community that should help with recruiting. Filling the stadium with 50,000 or more fans would be a huge contrast to past season that have estimated the attendance at the spring game at 6,000 or less. Actual attendance was 17,800, a record for spring game.

==== Awards ====
- George Hypolite
  - Lombardi Award watchlist
  - Lott Trophy watchlist
  - Outland Trophy watchlist

== Game summaries ==
=== Colorado State ===
	1	2	3	4	Total
Buffaloes	0	21	10	7	38
Rams	0	14	3	0	17

The 2008 Qwest Rocky Mountain Showdown was played at Invesco Field at Mile High in Denver.

External link: https://web.archive.org/web/20070827084821/http://www.qwestrockymountainshowdown.com/

=== Eastern Washington ===
	1	2	3	4	Total
Eagles	7	14	0	3	24
Buffaloes	0	7	7	17	31

=== West Virginia ===
	1	2	3	4	OT	Total
Mountaineers	7	0	7	0	0	14
Buffaloes	14	0	0	0	3	17

=== Florida State ===
	1	2	3	4	Total
Buffaloes	7	0	0	14	21
Seminoles	7	12	6	14	39

=== Texas ===
	1	2	3	4	Total
#5 Texas	14	7	14	3	38
Colorado	0	0	7	7	14

The morning of the game, sports books favored Texas by 13 points. The weather forecast called for a game-time temperature of 64 °F (18 °C) and a 30% chance of rain, with isolated thunderstorms.

The Longhorns won 38–14.

=== Kansas ===
	1	2	3	4	Total
Buffaloes	7	0	7	0	14
Jayhawks	0	9	7	14	30

Heading into the game against Colorado, Kansas was ranked #15 in the Coaches Poll. This made the 17th consecutive week that Kansas was ranked in the Top 25 (dating back to 2007), a school record. Before the start of the game Kansas Coach Mark Mangino asked the KU student section to refrain from an expletive kickoff chant that has become a student tradition. Despite Mangino's plea, the student section yelled the chant louder than ever. Colorado scored first with an 11-yard Cody Hawkins touchdown pass. Colorado got the ball back soon thereafter, but Hawkins threw an interception inside the red zone and the Kansas defense prevented another Colorado score. Kansas first got on the board with a Jake Sharp touchdown run in the 2nd Quarter. On Colorado's next possession, Hawkins was sacked for a 17-yard loss and a safety to give Kansas its first lead. Once again Kansas came out and played much better in the second half. In the second half Todd Reesing passed for his only touchdown to Dezmond Briscoe and Sharp rushed for two more touchdowns. Sharp's first start of the season was successful as he rushed for 118 yards on 31 carries and for 3 touchdowns. Sharp's performance was by far the best of any Kansas running back through the first 6 games of the season. Reesing had his most accurate game of the season, completing 27 of 34 passes for 256 yards and 1 touchdown. Wide receiver Kerry Meier had 9 receptions for 94 yards. A few hours after the Kansas win, the only other undefeated North team in Big 12 play, Missouri, lost to Oklahoma State. Kansas stood atop the Big 12 North with a record of 2–0.

=== Kansas State ===
	1	2	3	4	Total
Wildcats	6	0	7	0	13
Buffaloes	0	14	0	0	14

Going into the game, K-State had beaten Colorado two years in a row, including a win in Boulder in 2006. Colorado was favored by 3½. Colorado leads the all-time series 43-19-1.

The Colorado Buffaloes found an answer to their quarterback troubles, turning to freshman Tyler Hansen, who sparked them to a 14-13 win.

Cody Hawkins, the son of Buffs coach Dan Hawkins, was benched and switched offensive series with Tyler Hansen.

Although Hawkins mostly handed off to Rodney Stewart (29 carries for 141 yards), he also hit J.R. Smith for 22 yards on third-and-15 from his own 29 on the drive.

His fourth-and-4 pass to Smith, however, fell incomplete and Kansas State took over at its own 31 with 59 seconds remaining.

Josh Freeman's fourth-down desperation heave to Brandon Banks at the Buffs’ 20-yard line was broken up by free safety Ryan Walters on the last play of the game.

Hansen finished a modest 7-of-14 for 71 yards with one touchdown and one interception, but he also ran 19 times for 86 yards, bringing a dimension that Hawkins doesn’t have. Hawkins was 6-of-11 for 35 yards.

Trailing 6-0 and in need of a spark to break out of their monthlong slump, Hansen entered the game and promptly fumbled his first snap out of bounds. But on third-and-12 from his 28, Hansen gained 13 yards on a draw play and suddenly the Buffs, who snapped a three-game skid, had the momentum.

He drove them to the Kansas State 4, where Hawkins re-entered and handed off to Stewart, who ran into the end zone to give Colorado a 7-6 lead.

The next time Hansen drove the Buffs downfield, Hawkins stayed on the sideline and Hansen hit Scotty McKnight with a 21-yard touchdown pass down the left sideline for a 14-6 lead.

Brooks Rossman kicked field goals of 37 and 53 yards but was wide right from 47 yards and wide left from 42 in the first half.

The Wildcats pulled to 14-13 when Freeman scored untouched on 17-yard keeper early in the third quarter.

Colorado had a chance to pad its slim lead but Aric Goodman's 47-yard field goal try sailed wide right at the last moment. Goodman's 48-yard attempt in the first half was blocked by Ian Campbell, Kansas State's seventh block in seven games, best in the nation.

=== Missouri ===
	1	2	3	4	Total
Buffaloes	0	0	0	0	0
#16 Tigers	21	13	14	10	58

The Tigers won their 600th game since their inception in 1890, in an overwhelming 58-0 shutout of the Buffaloes in the Tigers' Homecoming game at Faurot Field rolling up 491 total offensive yards. Chase Daniel passed for 302 yards, and the runners ran for another 189 yards. Daniel was 31-for-37 throwing five touchdowns, intercepted once. Jeremy Maclin had 11 pass receptions for 134 yards with two touchdowns. The defense was outstanding, holding Colorado to a mere 41 net yards rushing and 158 passing for only 199 total offensive yards.

=== Texas A&M ===
	1	2	3	4	Total
Buffaloes	7	3	0	7	17
Aggies	0	3	21	0	24

Coming into the game, the Aggies had held a 2–5 overall record against the Colorado Buffaloes. Of the three games that were played at Kyle Field, the Aggies had only won the 2004 contest. In the preseason, the Buffaloes acquired Darrell Scott, who was ranked the best running back in the 2008 recruiting class by Rivals.com. In their previous game, the Buffaloes suffered a 58–0 shutout at the hands of No. 16 Missouri. Both teams bought an even matchup to the field, with Colorado fielding an offense that had scored 19 points per game, whereas A&M's scoring defense had allowed 35 points per game. The Aggie defense had given up a total of 1,584 in their past three games against Iowa State, Texas Tech, and Kansas State. A&M was favored to win by 3.5 points.

=== Iowa State ===
	1	2	3	4	Total
Cyclones	3	7	7	7	24
Buffaloes	0	0	13	15	28

Highlights: Colorado trailed 24-13 with 10 minutes left in the game. The final play the Colorado defense stopped Iowa State running back Alexander Robinson with a 2-yard loss on CU's 1-yard line. Cody Hawkins replaced QB Tyler Hansen in the second half. Hawkins threw for 226 yards. Kicker Aric Goodman missed two field goals and had a blocked kick.

=== Oklahoma State ===
	1	2	3	4	Total
Cowboys	6	7	14	3	30
Buffaloes	0	3	7	7	17

=== Nebraska ===
	1	2	3	4	Total
Buffaloes	14	10	7	0	31
Cornhuskers	14	10	3	13	40

=== Coaching staff ===
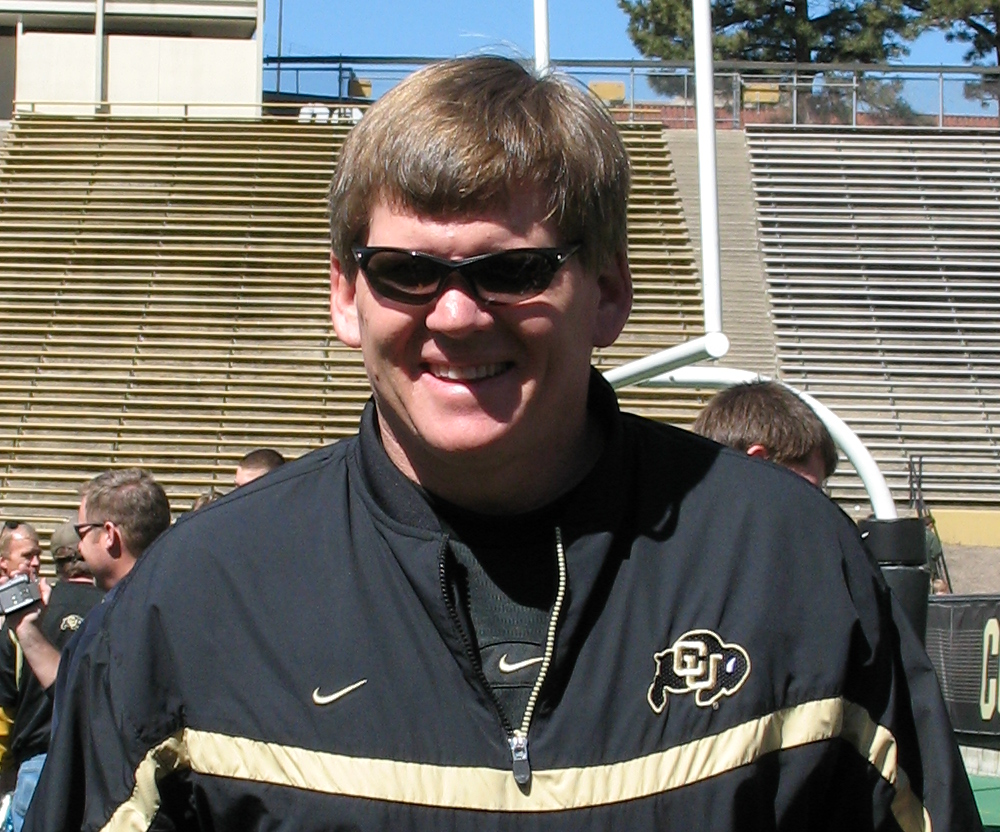
Dan Hawkins

Name	Position	Years at CU	Alma mater (year)
Dan Hawkins	Head coach	2	University of California, Davis (1984)
Brian Cabral	Linebackers; Associate head coach	19	University of Colorado at Boulder (1978)
Ron Collins	Defensive coordinator	2	Washington State University (1987)
Mark Helfrich	Offensive coordinator Quarterbacks	2	Southern Oregon University (1996)
Jeff Grimes	Offensive line	1	University of Texas at El Paso (1991)
Eric Kiesau	Passing Game Coordinator; Receivers	2	Portland State University (1996)
Romeo Bandison	Defensive line	2	University of Oregon (1994)
Greg Brown	Secondary	5 (1991–93)	University of Texas at El Paso (1980)
Darian Hagan	Running backs	3	University of Colorado at Boulder (1991)
Kent Riddle	Tight ends Special teams	2	Oregon State University (1991)
Mark Nolan	Recruiting coordinator	2	Willamette University (1995)
Jashon Sykes	Recruiting coordinator	2	University of Colorado at Boulder (2002)

=== Roster ===
Kai Maiava, who was a freshman All-Big 12 offensive linemen in 2007, and switched to the fullback position in the offseason, decided to leave the team after the 2008 spring semester. His reasons did not include the position switch, but for family issues. He transferred to UCLA.

=== Recruiting ===
National Signing Day was on February 6, 2008 and Colorado signed high school athletes from around the country.

Key recruit was five-star running back Darrell Scott of Ventura, California. Scott is the highest rated recruit heading to Colorado since Marcus Houston of Denver came to Boulder as part of the 2000 class.

College recruiting
Name	Hometown	School	Height	Weight	40^{‡}	Commit date
Chance Blackmon; WR	Tatum, Texas	Tatum HS	6 ft 3 in (1.91 m)	180 lb (82 kg)	4.54	
Chance Blackmon; WR	Recruit ratings: Scout: Rivals: (74)					
Curtis Cunningham; DT	Littleton, Colorado	Columbine HS	6 ft 2 in (1.88 m)	263 lb (119 kg)	4.9	
Curtis Cunningham; DT	Recruit ratings: Scout: Rivals: (76)					
Ryan Dannewitz; OL	San Jacinto, California	San Jacinto Senior HS	6 ft 6 in (1.98 m)	270 lb (120 kg)	5.5	
Ryan Dannewitz; OL	Recruit ratings: Scout: Rivals: (40)					
Ryan Deehan; TE	Poway, California	Poway HS	6 ft 4 in (1.93 m)	229 lb (104 kg)	4.77	
Ryan Deehan; TE	Recruit ratings: Scout: Rivals: (78)					
Vince Ewing; DB	Carlsbad, California	Carlsbad HS	6 ft 1 in (1.85 m)	195 lb (88 kg)	4.68	
Vince Ewing; DB	Recruit ratings: Scout: Rivals: (68)					
Bryce Givens; OL	Denver, Colorado	Mullen HS	6 ft 6 in (1.98 m)	261 lb (118 kg)	5.15	
Bryce Givens; OL	Recruit ratings: Scout: Rivals: (78)					
Tyler Hansen; QB	Temecula, California	Chaparral HS	6 ft 1 in (1.85 m)	190 lb (86 kg)	4.68	
Tyler Hansen; QB	Recruit ratings: Scout: Rivals: (40)					
Stephen Hicks; DB	Whitehouse, Texas	Whitehouse	5 ft 11 in (1.80 m)	180 lb (82 kg)	4.47	
Stephen Hicks; DB	Recruit ratings: Scout: Rivals: (40)					
Lynn Katoa; LB	Salt Lake City, Utah	Cottonwood HS	6 ft 2 in (1.88 m)	220 lb (100 kg)	4.6	
Lynn Katoa; LB	Recruit ratings: Scout: Rivals: (80)					
Patrick Mahnke; DB	Highlands Ranch, Colorado	Mountain Vista HS	6 ft 2 in (1.88 m)	187 lb (85 kg)	4.61	
Patrick Mahnke; DB	Recruit ratings: Scout: Rivals: (73)					
Jon Major; LB	Parker, Colorado	Ponderosa HS	6 ft 4 in (1.93 m)	228 lb (103 kg)	4.54	
Jon Major; LB	Recruit ratings: Scout: Rivals: (81)					
Shaun Mohler; LB	Costa Mesa, California	Orange Coast College	6 ft 3 in (1.91 m)	225 lb (102 kg)	4.6	
Shaun Mohler; LB	Recruit ratings: Scout: Rivals: (JC)					
Will Pericak; LB	Boulder, Colorado	Boulder HS	6 ft 4 in (1.93 m)	244 lb (111 kg)	4.84	
Will Pericak; LB	Recruit ratings: Scout: Rivals: (68)					
Darrell Scott; RB	Ventura, California	St. Bonaventure HS	6 ft 0 in (1.83 m)	204 lb (93 kg)	4.4	
Darrell Scott; RB	Recruit ratings: Scout: Rivals: (89)					
Rodney Stewart; RB	Columbus, Ohio	Brookhaven HS	5 ft 7 in (1.70 m)	173 lb (78 kg)	4.4	
Rodney Stewart; RB	Recruit ratings: Scout: Rivals: (40)					
Max Tuioti-Mariner; OL	Corona, California	Corona Senior HS	6 ft 4 in (1.93 m)	295 lb (134 kg)	5	
Max Tuioti-Mariner; OL	Recruit ratings: Scout: Rivals: (80)					
Paul Vigo; ATH	New Brunswick, New Jersey	New Brunswick HS	6 ft 1 in (1.85 m)	188 lb (85 kg)	4.5	
Paul Vigo; ATH	Recruit ratings: Scout: Rivals: (66)					
Ryan Wallace; TE	Bowling Green, Kentucky		6 ft 4 in (1.93 m)	223 lb (101 kg)	4.8	
Ryan Wallace; TE	Recruit ratings: Scout: Rivals: (74)					
Overall recruit ranking:
‡ Refers to 40-yard dash; Note: In many cases, Scout, Rivals, 247Sports, On3, and ESPN may conflict in their listings of height, weight and 40 time.; In these cases, the average was taken. ESPN grades are on a 100-point scale.; Sources: "Colorado 2008 Football Commitments". Rivals.; "2008 Colorado Recruits". Scout.; "2008 Colorado". ESPN.; "Scout.com Team Recruiting Rankings". Scout.; "2008 Team Ranking". Rivals.com.

== Statistics ==
=== Team ===
	Team	Opp
Scoring	242	351
Points per game		
First downs	226	249
Rushing	100	116
Passing	112	116
Penalty	14	17
Total offense (yards)	3,822	4,579
Avg per play	4.53	5.48
Avg per game	318.5	381.6
Fumbles lost	33-10	16-8
Penalties – yards	65-516	67-592
Avg per game		

	Team	Opp
Punts – yards	64-2,535	58-2,433
Avg per Punt	39.6	42.0
Time of possession/game	28:57	31:03
3rd down conversions	68-161	66-168
4th down conversions	18-25	6-15
Touchdowns scored		
Field goals – attempts – long		
PAT – attempts		
Attendance	296,858	328,071
Games/Avg per game	6/49,476	5/64,614

==== Scores by quarter ====
	1	2	3	4	Total
Colorado	49	58	55	77	239
Opponents	85	96	103	67	351

=== Offense ===
==== Rushing ====
Name	GP-GS	Att	Gain	Loss	Net	Avg	TD	Long	Avg/G
Rodney Stewart	9	132	669	47	622	4.71	2	22	69.1
Darrell Scott	11	87	364	21	343	3.94	1	42	31.2
Tyler Hansen	5	63	322	61	261	4.14	0	24	52.2
Demetrius Sumler	12	63	266	15	251	3.98	4	36	20.9
Josh Smith	12	12	60	28	32	2.67	0	24	2.7
Kevin Moyd	12	7	34	4	30	3.33	0	21	2.5
Jason Espinoza	2	1	5	0	5	5.00	0	5	2.5
Cody Crawford	12	1	2	0	2	2.00	0	2	0.2
Scotty McKnight	12	2	5	3	2	1.00	0	5	0.2
Patrick Williams	12	2	2	0	2	1.00	0	1	0.2
Matt Ballenger	2	7	16	23	-7	-3.50	0	11	-3.5
Cody Hawkins	12	57	150	173	-23	-0.04	3	19	-1.9
TEAM	-	5	0	26	-26	-	-	-1	-
Total									
Opponents									

==== Passing ====
Name	GP-GS	Effic	Att-Cmp-Int	Pct	Yds	TD	Lng	Avg/G
Cody Hawkins	12		320-183-10	57.2	1892	17	68	
Tyler Hansen	5		65- 34- 4	52.3	280	1	29	
Matt Ballenger	2		12- 8- 0	66.7	118	1	28	
Scotty McKnight	12		3- 1- 0	33.3	38	0	28	
TEAM	-		4- 0- 0	0.0	0	-	-	
Total								
Opponents								

==== Receiving ====
Name	GP-GS	No.	Yds	Avg	TD	Long	Avg/G
Scotty McKnight	12	46	519	11.3	5	37	43.3
Josh Smith	12	29	387	13.3	3	44	32.3
Patrick Williams	12	30	322	10.7	2	36	26.8
Cody Crawford	12	31	269	8.7	2	19	22.4
Riar Geer	10	13	183	14.1	2	68	18.3
Demetrius Sumler	12	18	167	9.3	0	40	13.9
Patrick Devenny	12	14	116	8.3	2	14	9.7
Darrell Scott	11	9	105	11.7	0	38	9.5
Jake Behrens	12	12	75	6.3	2	13	6.3
Ryan Deehan	12	5	61	12.2	1	25	5.1
Kendrick Celestine	2	5	46	9.2	0	35	23.0
Rodney Stewart	9	7	43	6.2	0	10	4.8
Maurice Cantrell	12	4	21	5.3	0	7	1.8
Steve Melton	8	2	15	7.5	0	8	1.9
Kevin Moyd	12	1	-1	-1.0	0	-1	-0.1
Total							
Opponents							

=== Defense ===
Name	GP	Tackles				Sacks	Pass defense		Interceptions				Fumbles		Blkd kick
Name	GP	Solo	Ast	Total	TFL-yds	No-yds	BrUp	QBH	No.-yds	Avg	TD	Long	Rcv-yds	FF	Blkd kick
Total															

=== Special teams ===
Name	Punting								Kickoffs				
Name	No.	Yds	Avg	Long	TB	FC	I20	Blkd	No.	Yds	Avg	TB	OB
Total													

Name	Punt returns					Kick returns				
Name	No.	Yds	Avg	TD	Long	No.	Yds	Avg	TD	Long
Total										
