= William Moore (American football) =

American football player (born 1985)

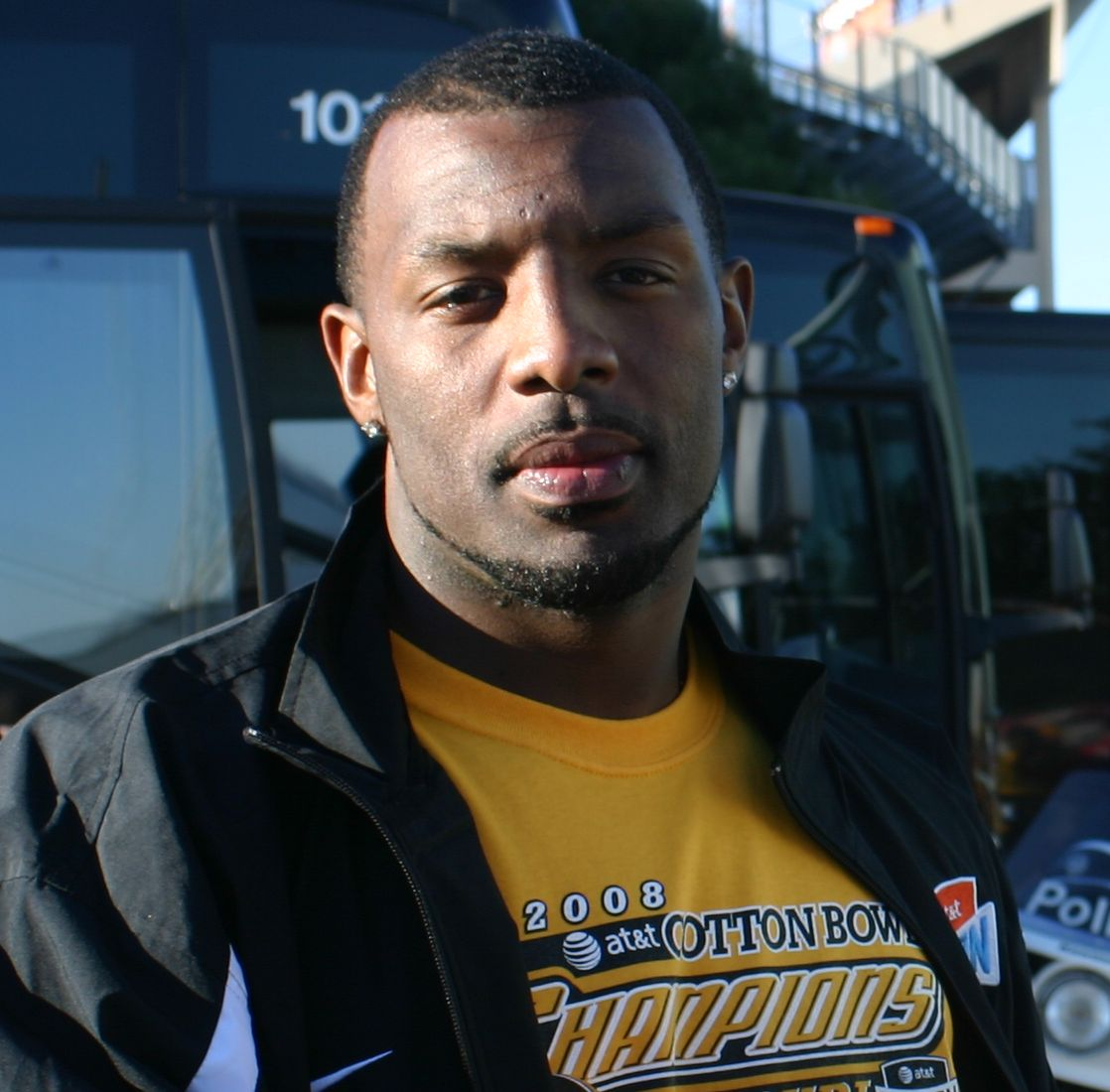
- Moore in 2009

No. 25
- Position: Safety

Personal information
- Born: May 18, 1985 (age 41); Hayti, Missouri, U.S.
- Listed height: 6 ft 0 in (1.83 m)
- Listed weight: 221 lb (100 kg)

Career information
- High school: Hayti
- College: Missouri (2004–2008)
- NFL draft: 2009: 2nd round, 55th overall pick

Career history
- Atlanta Falcons (2009–2015)

Awards and highlights
- Pro Bowl (2012); First-team All-American (2007); 2× First-team All-Big 12 (2007, 2008)

Career NFL statistics
- Total tackles: 365
- Sacks: 3.5
- Forced fumbles: 11
- Fumble recoveries: 4
- Interceptions: 16
- Stats at Pro Football Reference

William Moore (born May 18, 1985) is an American former professional football player who spent his entire seven-year career as a safety with the Atlanta Falcons of the National Football League (NFL). He played college football for the Missouri Tigers. He was chosen by the Falcons in the second round of the 2009 NFL draft.

== Early life ==
While at Hayti High School Moore was a standout wide receiver and cornerback earning all-state honors on both sides of the ball. While at Hayti he helped them win three consecutive conference championships from 2001 to 2003. He finished his high school career with a school record 74 receptions for 1,768 yards and 34 touchdowns.

== College career ==
Moore chose to play college football at the University of Missouri over schools such as Oklahoma, Purdue, Mississippi, Arkansas and Illinois, among others. After being redshirted as a freshman in 2004, he played in nine games in 2005, starting two of them, finishing the season with 30 tackles and one interception. As a sophomore in 2006 he played in all 13 games, with four starts. He finished the season with 51 tackles and an interception. As a junior in 2007 Moore recorded 117 tackles and set a school record with eight interceptions, returning one for a touchdown. His play earned him All-American and All-Big 12 first-team honors. As a senior in 2008, he battled through numerous injuries which cost him to miss two full games and parts of two others. Despite the injuries he finished the season with 85 tackles and an interception.

Moore finished his college career with 284 tackles, 11 interceptions, three sacks, and a school record four interception return touchdowns.

== Professional career ==
Pre-draft measurables
Height	Weight	Arm length	Hand span	40-yard dash	10-yard split	20-yard split	20-yard shuttle	Three-cone drill	Vertical jump	Broad jump	Bench press
6 ft 0 1/8 in (1.83 m)	221 lb (100 kg)	32 1/4 in (0.82 m)	9 1/8 in (0.23 m)	4.49 s	1.48 s	2.60 s	4.26 s	6.81 s	37.5 in (0.95 m)	10 ft 6 in (3.20 m)	16 reps
All values from NFL Combine/Pro Day

Moore was drafted by the Atlanta Falcons in the second round of the 2009 NFL draft. He wore the number 25 to honor his Missouri teammate Aaron O'Neal, who died during a voluntary workout in the summer of 2005.

Moore played only two games in his rookie season, however in his 2010 season, he played 16 games, recording 82 total tackles, 5 interceptions, and one forced fumble. He was the fifth-leading tackler for the Atlanta Falcons in 2010, and was tied with Brent Grimes as the leader in interceptions, with five each. Moore also played with a former Missouri Tigers teammate, Sean Weatherspoon. Moore was named to the 2013 Pro Bowl as a replacement for Donte Whitner. On March 9, 2013, Moore signed a five-year, $32 million contract to stay with the Falcons. On February 8, 2016, Moore was released by the Falcons even with two years left on his contract.

== NFL career statistics ==
Year	Team	GP	Tackles				Fumbles			Interceptions					
Year	Team	GP	Cmb	Solo	Ast	Sck	FF	FR	Yds	Int	Yds	Avg	Lng	TD	PD
2009	ATL	2	2	1	1	0.0	23	0	0	0	0	0.0	0	0	0
2010	ATL	16	72	59	13	0.0	1	1	0	5	200	40.0	34	0	8
2011	ATL	12	54	40	14	0.5	2	0	0	2	56	28.0	29	0	9
2012	ATL	12	75	59	16	1.0	2	1	0	4	51	12.8	33	0	8
2013	ATL	16	86	67	19	2.0	3	2	0	3	36	12.0	19	0	7
2014	ATL	7	25	13	12	0.0	2	0	0	0	0	0.0	0	0	0
2015	ATL	11	51	38	13	0.0	1	0	0	2	14	7.0	11	0	4
Career		76	364	276	88	3.5	11	4	0	16	274	17.1	34	0	36

== 2023 arrest ==
Moore was arrested for an incident that occurred April 23, 2023. He is accused of firing into a vehicle at Alexander Park in Lawrenceville, Ga. The victim’s two young children were inside the car. He was arrested on April 26 and charged with two counts of aggravated assault, two counts of child cruelty and criminal damage to property among other charges.
