= 2008 Big 12 Championship Game =

2008 Dr Pepper Big 12 Championship Game
- Conference Championship
- 2008 Big 12 Championship logo.
Missouri Tigers	Oklahoma Sooners
(9–3)	(11–1)
21	62
Head coach: Gary Pinkel	Head coach: Bob Stoops
AP / Coaches / BCS; 19 / 17 / 20	AP / Coaches / BCS; 4 / 2 / 2
	1	2	3	4	Total
Missouri	0	7	7	7	21
Oklahoma	10	28	3	21	62
- Date: December 6, 2008
- Season: 2008
- Stadium: Arrowhead Stadium
- Location: Kansas City, Missouri
- MVP: QB Sam Bradford
- Favorite: Oklahoma by 17
- Referee: Randy Christal
- Attendance: 71,004

United States TV coverage
- Network: ABC
- Announcers: Brent Musburger and Kirk Herbstreit

The 2008 Dr Pepper Big 12 Championship Game was held on December 6, 2008, at Arrowhead Stadium in Kansas City, Missouri, and pitted two of the divisional winners from the Big 12 Conference: the Missouri Tigers, winner of the North division against the Oklahoma Sooners, co-champion of the South division. Kickoff was scheduled for 8 p.m. EST/5pm PST and was televised by ABC as part of its Saturday Night Football package.

Per Big 12 policy, the Big 12 South Champion was declared the home team because the game took place in a home state of a Big 12 North team. Entering the game, designated "home" teams were 8–4 in Big 12 Championship Games.

== Selection process ==
2008 Big 12 Conference football standings
	Conf.			Overall
Team	W		L	W		L
North Division
No. 19 Missouri xy	5	–	3	10	–	4
Nebraska x	5	–	3	9	–	4
Kansas	4	–	4	8	–	5
Colorado	2	–	6	5	–	7
Kansas State	2	–	6	5	–	7
Iowa State	0	–	8	2	–	10
South Division
No. 5 Oklahoma xy$	7	–	1	12	–	2
No. 4 Texas x%	7	–	1	12	–	1
No. 12 Texas Tech x	7	–	1	11	–	2
No. 16 Oklahoma State	5	–	3	9	–	4
Baylor	2	–	6	4	–	8
Texas A&M	2	–	6	4	–	8
Championship: Oklahoma 62, Missouri 21
$ – BCS representative as conference champion; % – BCS at-large representative; x – Division champion/co-champions; y – Championship game participant; Rankings from AP Poll

The Big 12 Championship Game matched up the winners of the North and South divisions of the Big 12 Conference. The game was first played in 1996, when the conference was formed from the previous Big 8 plus four teams from the disbanded Southwest Conference. The championship game was somewhat modeled on the SEC format, which was the first conference in college football to have a conference championship game.

Seven Division I FBS conferences currently have championship games—the AAC, ACC, Big Ten, C-USA, MAC, Pac-12, and SEC. However, the Big 12 title game ended after the 2010 edition. A major conference realignment that started in 2010 and carried over into 2011 saw the Big 12 drop to 10 members, below the 12 required by NCAA rules for a conference championship game. The same realignment saw the Big Ten and former Pac-10 expand to 12 teams each; both conferences held their first championship games in 2011. The Big 12 Championship Game has since returned in the 2017 season, with the top two teams playing in the game.

== Regular season ==
The Big 12 South representative in the game was the Oklahoma Sooners. This was the 114th year of season play for the Sooners who were led by head coach Bob Stoops, a two-time Walter Camp Coach of the Year award winner. The team was led on offense by quarterback Sam Bradford. The Sooners played their homes games at Gaylord Family Oklahoma Memorial Stadium in Norman, Oklahoma. The team finished their regular season 11-1 (7-1, Big 12), with the only loss coming to the Texas Longhorns. (see "South Division 3-way-tie controversy" section below) They entered the game ranked No. 2 in the BCS and Coaches poll, and No. 4 in the AP poll.

The Big 12 North representative in the championship game was the Missouri Tigers. The team was coached by Gary Pinkel, who returned in his eighth season with Mizzou. The Tigers played their home games at Faurot Field at Memorial Stadium. Quarterback Chase Daniel returned for his final year of eligibility and led the Tigers to a second appearance in the Big 12 Championship Game. The Tigers ended the regular season with a record of 9-3 (5-3, Big 12), with losses coming to Oklahoma State, Texas, and Kansas. They entered the game ranked No. 20 in the BCS, No. 17 in the Coaches poll, and No. 19 in the AP poll.

=== South Division 3-way-tie controversy ===
Oklahoma, Texas, Texas Tech all finished the season with identical 7–1 conference records, creating a three-way tie for the South division championship. Under Big 12 tiebreaker rules, ties are normally broken by head-to-head matchups, but this case was unique as Texas beat Oklahoma 45–35, Oklahoma beat Texas Tech 65–21, and Texas Tech beat Texas 39–33, which made breaking the three-way tie impossible using head-to-head results. Because the first four tie-breakers did not dictate a winner, Big 12 rules dictated that the fifth tie-breaker was that the team with the highest BCS Ranking, based on the standings released on November 30 of that year, would represent the South Division. This in turn meant that coaches, journalists and computer rankings, which are the components of the BCS ranking formula, decided the South Division representative. Texas Tech, Texas, and Oklahoma were all presented Big 12 South Champion trophies from the Big 12. During the final week of the Big 12 regular season, Oklahoma defeated a tough Oklahoma State, and Texas defeated a much softer Texas A&M delivering a sufficiently higher computer rating to Oklahoma.
