= Stryker Sulak =

American football player (born 1986)

No. 96, 47
- Position: Linebacker

Personal information
- Born: June 17, 1986 (age 40); Rockdale, Texas, U.S.
- Listed height: 6 ft 5 in (1.96 m)
- Listed weight: 251 lb (114 kg)

Career information
- High school: Rockdale (TX)
- College: Missouri
- NFL draft: 2009: 6th round, 199th overall pick

Career history
- Green Bay Packers (2009)*
- * Offseason or practice squad member only

Awards and highlights
- First-team All-Big 12 (2007); Second-team All-Big 12 (2008)

Stryker Sulak (born June 17, 1986) is an American former football linebacker with the Green Bay Packers. He was selected by the Oakland Raiders in the sixth round of the 2009 NFL draft but was waived before he signed a contract. He played college football at Missouri.

== Early life ==
Sulak was a standout defensive end at Rockdale High School, Texas, who was a First-team All-State selection in 2003 by the Texas Sports Writers Association after leading his team with 83 tackles and returning an interception 78 yards for a touchdown and also caught one touchdown and a 2-point conversion playing the tight end spot. He was his team's 5th-leading tackler as a junior in 2002, with 70 total tackles. He earned First-team All-District as well as his team's defensive MVP award that year, He also competed in baseball, basketball and track at Rockdale, and was a regional qualifier in the high jump in 2002.

== College career ==
At the University of Missouri, in 2008, Sulak played 14 games and made 55 tackles (29 solo) with 15.5 for losses. He also had 10.5 sacks, forced six fumbles (to bring his career total to 14) and broke up six passes. He was Second-team All-Big 12 and played in the 2009 East-West Shrine Game. In 2007, as a junior, Sulak was First-Team All-Big 12 after recording 60 tackles and a team-best 11 tackles for loss and 6 sacks and also forcing four fumbles. In 2006, he played in 12 games, starting 4 and had 46 total tackles, including 4.0 tackles for loss and 1 QB sack, as well as 1 forced fumble, 2 recovered fumbles, 5 QB pressures and 5 passes broken up. In 2005, he was named First-team Freshman All-Big 12 performer by the Sporting News after taking over as the starter at one end spot for the final 7 games of the season. He made 38 total tackles on the year, including 6.5 tackles for loss and 4 sacks and 3 forced fumbles. In 2004, he redshirted.

== Professional career ==
=== Oakland Raiders ===
The Oakland Raiders drafted Sulak in the sixth round of the 2009 NFL draft. Before he was signed to a contract, his rights were waived on July 13, making him only the third drafted rookie cut before signing a contract. No official reason was given for the Raiders' decision to waive their rights to Sulak.

=== Green Bay Packers ===
Sulak signed with the Green Bay Packers on August 13, 2009. With the signing, he was moved to outside linebacker. He was waived on August 30.
