= Big 12 Championship Game =

College football game held by the Big 12 Conference

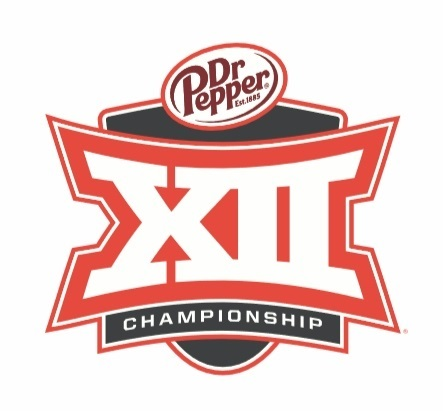
- Sport: Football
- Conference: Big 12 Conference
- Current stadium: AT&T Stadium
- Current location: Arlington, Texas
- Played: 1996–2010; 2017–2026
- Last contest: 2025
- Current champion: Texas Tech Red Raiders
- Most championships: Oklahoma Sooners (11)
- TV partner(s): ABC (1996–2010, 2018–present); Fox (2017)
- Official website: Big12Sports.com – Football

Sponsors
- Dr Pepper (1996–2010, 2018–2024); AT&T (2017); Edward Jones (2025)

Host stadiums
- Trans World Dome (1996, 1998); Alamodome (1997, 1999, 2007); Arrowhead Stadium (2000, 2003, 2004, 2006, 2008); Texas Stadium (2001); Reliant Stadium (2002, 2005); AT&T Stadium (2009–2010, 2017–2026)

Host locations
- St. Louis, Missouri (1996, 1998); San Antonio (1997, 1999, 2007); Kansas City, Missouri (2000, 2003, 2004, 2006, 2008); Irving, Texas (2001); Houston, Texas (2002, 2005); Arlington, Texas (2009, 2010, 2017–2026)

Big 12 Conference Members
Location of Big 12 members:
1 Arizona
2 Arizona State
3 Baylor
4 BYU
5 Cincinnati
6 Colorado
7 Houston
8 Iowa State
9 Kansas
10 Kansas State
11 Oklahoma State
12 Texas Tech
13 TCU
14 UCF
15 Utah
16 West Virginia

The Big 12 Championship Game is a college football game held by the Big 12 Conference between the best and the second-best Big 12 team. The game was played each year since the conference's formation in 1996 until 2010 and returned during the 2017 season. From 1996 to 2010, the championship game pitted the Big 12 North Division champion against the South Division champion in a game held after the regular season was completed. From 2017 onward, the game features the two teams with the best conference records.

In the first eight Big 12 championship games, from 1996 to 2003, the divisions split four games each, with the north champion winning in every odd-numbered year and the south champion winning in every even-numbered year. However, the North division champion did not win after No. 13 Kansas State's 35–7 upset victory over No. 1 Oklahoma in 2003.

The game will be discontinued for the second time after the 2026 edition following the College Football Playoff's expansion to 24 teams beginning in 2027. The Big 12 was previously under contract to play the game at AT&T Stadium in Arlington, Texas until 2030.

== History ==
The first championship game was played after the 1996 regular season, the first year of play for the Big 12 (which was created from the merger of the Big Eight Conference and four teams from the Southwest Conference). Like the SEC Championship Game (which has been played since 1992), the game matched the winners of the conference's two six-team divisions. The championship game was held at several sites within the Big 12 states, with Arrowhead Stadium in Kansas City, Missouri, hosting more often than any other venue.

The 2008 Big 12 Championship Game was notable for the controversy over choosing the South Division representative. The Oklahoma Sooners, Texas Longhorns, and Texas Tech Red Raiders all finished with identical records and had each recorded a win and loss among one another. The Sooners earned a berth to the title game because they had the highest Bowl Championship Series ranking of the three at the time of selection. Oklahoma defeated the Missouri Tigers and earned a berth in the 2009 BCS National Championship Game.

From 2009 through 2013, the game was scheduled to be played at Cowboys Stadium, now known as AT&T Stadium, in Arlington, Texas. During June 2010, however, Nebraska and Colorado announced that they would leave the Big 12 for other conferences (the Big Ten Conference and the Pac-12 Conference, respectively) in 2011. Because NCAA rules at the time required that a conference have 12 members in order to stage a football championship game that was exempt from NCAA limits on regular-season games, the conference dropped the championship game following the 2010 season. During this time, Oklahoma and Texas had expressed that a conference title game hurt the chances of the conference to have a representative in the BCS National Championship Game, and now the College Football Playoff (CFP), which started in 2014.

In December 2014 after completing the first season with the College Football Playoff, Baylor and TCU both finished the season with an 8–1 conference record and were declared co-champions by the conference despite Baylor's head-to-head win over TCU. When the selection committee met to set the teams for the first playoff, both Baylor and TCU were overlooked in favor of teams that competed in and won their conference's championship game, leaving the Big 12 out of the playoffs. This led to criticism of how the Big 12 determined its champion.

In April 2015, legislation was developed by the ACC and the Big 12 to deregulate conference championship games. It was announced by NCAA officials as being expected to pass in time for the start of the 2016 season. The legislation passed on January 14, 2016 allowing a conference with fewer than twelve teams to stage a championship game between the top two teams, so long as they play a round-robin schedule. In late 2016, the Big 12 decided to bring back the championship game in 2017 after a seven-year-long gap of having no conference championship game.

As part of the CFP's expansion to 24 teams beginning in 2027, the game will be discontinued following its 2026 edition, alongside the football championship games of the ACC, Big Ten, and SEC. The regular season leader in the Big 12 will once again be crowned conference champion and awarded an automatic spot in the playoff beginning in 2027.

== Results ==
Below are the results from all Big 12 Championship Games played. The winning team appears in bold font, on a background of their primary team color. Rankings are from the AP Poll released prior to the game. From 1996 to 2010, the Big 12 was divided into two divisions, North and South. Following the departures of two schools in 2010, the conference discontinued the championship game in favor of a round-robin format to determine the champion. When it resumed in 2017, the top two seeds would face off in the championship game.

| Year | North Division | | South Division | | Site | Attendance | MVP |
|---|---|---|---|---|---|---|---|
| 1996 | 3 Nebraska | 27 | **Texas** | **37** | Trans World Dome • St. Louis, MO | 63,109 | RB DeAngelo Evans, Nebraska |
| 1997 | 2 **Nebraska** | **54** | 14 Texas A&M | 15 | Alamodome • San Antonio, TX | 64,824 | RB Ahman Green, Nebraska |
| 1998 | 2 Kansas State | 33 | 10 **Texas A&M** | **36** | Trans World Dome • St. Louis, MO | 60,798 | QB Branndon Stewart, Texas A&M |
| 1999 | 3 **Nebraska** | **22** | 12 Texas | 6 | Alamodome • San Antonio, TX | 65,035 | |
| 2000 | 8 Kansas State | 24 | 1 **Oklahoma** | **27** | Arrowhead Stadium • Kansas City, MO | 79,655 | QB Josh Heupel, Oklahoma |
| 2001 | 9 **Colorado** | **39** | 3 Texas | 37 | Texas Stadium • Irving, TX | 65,675 | |
| 2002 | 12 Colorado | 7 | 8 **Oklahoma** | **29** | Reliant Stadium • Houston, TX | 63,332 | RB Quentin Griffin, Oklahoma |
| 2003 | 13 **Kansas State** | **35** | 1 Oklahoma | 7 | Arrowhead Stadium • Kansas City, MO | 75,491 | QB Ell Roberson, Kansas State |
| 2004 | Colorado | 3 | 2 **Oklahoma** | **42** | Arrowhead Stadium • Kansas City, MO | 62,310 | WR Malcolm Kelly, Oklahoma |
| 2005 | Colorado | 3 | 2 **Texas** | **70** | Reliant Stadium • Houston, TX | 71,107 | QB Vince Young, Texas |
| 2006 | 19 Nebraska | 7 | 8 **Oklahoma** | **21** | Arrowhead Stadium • Kansas City, MO | 80,031 | WR Malcolm Kelly, Oklahoma |
| 2007 | 1 Missouri | 17 | 9 **Oklahoma** | **38** | Alamodome • San Antonio, TX | 62,585 | QB Sam Bradford, Oklahoma |
| 2008 | 19 Missouri | 21 | 4 **Oklahoma** | **62** | Arrowhead Stadium • Kansas City, MO | 71,004 | QB Sam Bradford, Oklahoma |
| 2009 | 21 Nebraska | 12 | 3 **Texas** | **13** | Cowboys Stadium • Arlington, TX | 76,211 | DT Ndamukong Suh, Nebraska |
| 2010 | 13 Nebraska | 20 | 10 **Oklahoma** | **23** | Cowboys Stadium • Arlington, TX | 78,802 | QB Landry Jones, Oklahoma |
2011–2016: No championship game held
| Year | #1 Seed | | #2 Seed | | Site | Attendance | MVP |
| 2017 | 2 **Oklahoma** | **41** | 10 TCU | 17 | AT&T Stadium • Arlington, TX | 64,104 | QB Baker Mayfield, Oklahoma |
| 2018 | 5 **Oklahoma** | **39** | 14 Texas | 27 | AT&T Stadium • Arlington, TX | 83,114 | QB Kyler Murray, Oklahoma |
| 2019 | 6**Oklahoma** | **30** | 7 Baylor | 23 | AT&T Stadium • Arlington, TX | 65,191 | QB Jalen Hurts, Oklahoma |
| 2020 | 8 Iowa State | 21 | 12 **Oklahoma** | **27** | AT&T Stadium • Arlington, TX | 18,720* | QB Spencer Rattler, Oklahoma |
| 2021 | 5 Oklahoma State | 16 | 9 **Baylor** | **21** | AT&T Stadium • Arlington, TX | 65,771 | QB Blake Shapen, Baylor |
| 2022 | 3 TCU | 28 | 10 **Kansas State** | **31**^{OT} | AT&T Stadium • Arlington, TX | 69,335 | RB Deuce Vaughn, Kansas State |
| 2023 | 7 **Texas** | **49** | 18 Oklahoma State | 21 | AT&T Stadium • Arlington, TX | 84,523 | QB Quinn Ewers, Texas |
| 2024 | 15 **Arizona State** | **45** | 16 Iowa State | 19 | AT&T Stadium • Arlington, TX | 55,889 | RB Cam Skattebo, Arizona State |
| 2025 | 4 **Texas Tech** | **34** | 11 BYU | 7 | AT&T Stadium • Arlington, TX | 85,519 | LB Ben Roberts, Texas Tech |
| 2026 | Utah | | | | AT&T Stadium • Arlington, TX | | |

*Limited attendance due to the COVID-19 pandemic

== Results by team ==
Eleven different teams have played in the Big 12 Championship Game, including all five former members. 29 conference championship game appearances are represented by the former members and 17 by current members. Of current members that have played at least one conference season:

=== Current members ===
| Appearances | School | Wins | Losses | PCT. | Year(s) Won | Year(s) Lost |
|---|---|---|---|---|---|---|
| 4 | Kansas State | 2 | 2 | .500 | 2003, 2022 | 1998, 2000 |
| 4 | Colorado | 1 | 3 | .250 | 2001 | 2002, 2004, 2005 |
| 2 | Baylor | 1 | 1 | .500 | 2021 | 2019 |
| 2 | TCU | 0 | 2 | .000 | | 2017, 2022 |
| 2 | Oklahoma State | 0 | 2 | .000 | | 2021, 2023 |
| 2 | Iowa State | 0 | 2 | .000 | | 2020, 2024 |
| 1 | Arizona State | 1 | 0 | 1.000 | 2024 | |
| 1 | Texas Tech | 1 | 0 | 1.000 | 2025 | |
| 1 | BYU | 0 | 1 | .000 | | 2025 |
| 1 | Utah | 0 | 0 | | | |
| 0 | Arizona | 0 | 0 | | | |
| 0 | Cincinnati | 0 | 0 | | | |
| 0 | Houston | 0 | 0 | | | |
| 0 | Kansas | 0 | 0 | | | |
| 0 | UCF | 0 | 0 | | | |
| 0 | West Virginia | 0 | 0 | | | |

- Arizona, Cincinnati, Houston, Kansas, UCF, and West Virginia have not yet appeared in a Big 12 Championship Game. Of these, Kansas joined the Big 12 in 1996, West Virginia in 2012, Cincinnati, Houston, and UCF in 2023, and Arizona and Utah in 2024.

=== Former members ===
| Appearances | School | Wins | Losses | PCT. | Year(s) Won | Year(s) Lost |
|---|---|---|---|---|---|---|
| 12 | Oklahoma | 11 | 1 | .917 | 2000, 2002, 2004, 2006, 2007, 2008, 2010, 2017, 2018, 2019, 2020 | 2003 |
| 7 | Texas | 4 | 3 | .571 | 1996, 2005, 2009, 2023 | 1999, 2001, 2018 |
| 6 | Nebraska | 2 | 4 | .333 | 1997, 1999 | 1996, 2006, 2009, 2010 |
| 2 | Texas A&M | 1 | 1 | .500 | 1998 | 1997 |
| 2 | Missouri | 0 | 2 | .000 | | 2007, 2008 |

=== Common matchups ===
Matchups that have occurred more than once:

Division era

| No. of Times | North Division | South Division | Record | Years Played |
|---|---|---|---|---|
| 3 | Nebraska | Texas | Texas, 2–1 | 1996, 1999, 2009 |
| 2 | Nebraska | Oklahoma | Oklahoma, 2–0 | 2006, 2010 |
| 2 | Missouri | Oklahoma | Oklahoma, 2–0 | 2007, 2008 |
| 2 | Colorado | Oklahoma | Oklahoma, 2–0 | 2004, 2005 |
| 2 | Kansas State | Oklahoma | Tied, 1–1 | 2003, 2000 |
| 2 | Colorado | Texas | Tied, 1–1 | 2005, 2001 |

=== Rematches ===
The Big 12 Championship game has featured a rematch of a regular-season game a total of thirteen times (1999, 2000, 2001, 2002, 2005, 2007, 2017, 2018, 2019, 2020, 2021, 2022, 2025). The team which won the regular-season game is 7-6 in the rematches, winning in 2000, 2002, 2005, 2007, 2017, 2019, and 2025 but losing in 1999, 2001, 2018, 2020, 2021, and 2022.

== Game records ==
| Team | Record, Team vs. Opponent | Year |
|---|---|---|
| Most points scored (one team) | 70, Texas vs. Colorado | 2005 |
| Most points scored (losing team) | 37, Texas vs. Colorado | 2001 |
| Fewest points scored (winning team) | 13, Texas vs. Nebraska | 2009 |
| Fewest points scored | 3, Colorado vs. Oklahoma; Colorado vs. Texas | 2004; 2005 |
| Most points scored (both teams) | 83, Oklahoma (62) vs. Missouri (21) | 2008 |
| Fewest points scored (both teams) | 25, Texas (13) vs. Nebraska (12) | 2009 |
| Most points scored in a half | 42, Texas (1st half) vs. Colorado | 2005 |
| Most points scored in a half (both teams) | 49, Oklahoma State vs. Texas (1st half) | 2023 |
| Largest margin of victory | 67, Texas (70) vs. Colorado (3) | 2005 |
| Smallest margin of victory | 1, Texas (13) vs. Nebraska (12) | 2009 |
| Total yards | 662, Texas (464 passing, 198 rushing) vs. Oklahoma St | 2023 |
| Rushing yards | 335, Nebraska vs. Texas A&M | 1997 |
| Passing yards | 464, Texas vs. Oklahoma State | 2023 |
| First downs | 39, Oklahoma vs. Missouri | 2008 |
| Fewest yards allowed | 46, Oklahoma vs. Colorado (50 passing, -4 rushing) | 2004 |
| Fewest rushing yards allowed | −4, Oklahoma vs. Colorado | 2004 |
| Fewest passing yards allowed | 39, Texas vs. Nebraska | 2009 |
| Individual | Record, Player, Team vs. Opponent | Year |
| Total offense | 458, Quinn Ewers, Texas vs. Oklahoma State | 2023 |
| Touchdowns responsible for | 4, shared by: Ell Roberson, Kansas State vs. Oklahoma; Baker Mayfield, Oklahoma vs. TCU; Quinn Ewers, Oklahoma State vs. Texas; Sam Leavitt, Arizona State vs. Iowa State | 2003; 2017; 2023; 2024 |
| Rushing yards | 235, Darren Sproles, Kansas State vs. Oklahoma | 2003 |
| Rushing touchdowns | 3, shared by seven players, most recent: Mossis Madu, Oklahoma vs. Missouri | 2008 |
| Passing yards | 452, Quinn Ewers, Oklahoma State vs. Texas | 2023 |
| Passing yards in a half | 354, Quinn Ewers, Oklahoma State vs. Texas (1st half) | 2023 |
| Passing touchdowns | 4, shared by: Ell Roberson, Kansas State vs. Oklahoma; Baker Mayfield, Oklahoma vs. TCU; Quinn Ewers, Texas vs. Oklahoma State | 2003; 2017; 2023 |
| Receiving yards | 177, Collin Johnson, Texas vs. Oklahoma | 2018 |
| Receiving touchdowns | 2, shared by nine players, most recent: Coy Eakin, Texas Tech vs. BYU | 2025 |
| Tackles | 17, shared by: Dat Nguyen, Texas A&M vs. Kansas State; Lavonte David, Nebraska vs. Oklahoma | 1998; 2010 |
| Sacks | 4.5, Ndamukong Suh, Nebraska vs. Texas | 2009 |
| Interceptions | 2, Ben Roberts, Texas Tech vs. BYU | 2025 |
| Long Plays | Record, Player, Team vs. Opponent | Year |
| Touchdown run | 66, Roy Helu, Nebraska vs. Oklahoma | 2010 |
| Touchdown pass | 81, Trestan Ebner from Jacob Zeno, Baylor vs. Oklahoma | 2019 |
| Kickoff return | 69, Roderick Sneed, Colorado vs. Oklahoma | 2003 |
| Punt return | 80, Jeremy Bloom, Colorado vs. Oklahoma | 2002 |
| Interception return | 73, Aaron Killion, Colorado vs. Texas | 2001 |
| Fumble return | 18, Caleb Kelly, Oklahoma vs. TCU | 2017 |
| Punt | 67, Shane Lechler, Texas A&M vs. Nebraska | 1997 |
| Field goal | 51, Kris Brown, Nebraska vs. Texas | 1996 |
| Miscellaneous | Record, Team vs. Team | Year |
| Game attendance | 85,519, Texas Tech vs. BYU | 2025 |

== See also ==
- List of NCAA Division I FBS conference championship games
