= 2008 Texas Longhorns football team =

American college football season

2008 Texas Longhorns football

Big 12 South Division co-champion Fiesta Bowl champion

Fiesta Bowl, W 24–21 vs. Ohio State
- Conference: Big 12 Conference
- South

Ranking
- Coaches: No. 3
- AP: No. 4
- Record: 12–1 (7–1 Big 12)
- Head coach: Mack Brown (11th season)
- Offensive coordinator: Greg Davis (11th season)
- Offensive scheme: Spread
- Defensive coordinator: Will Muschamp (1st season)
- Base defense: 4–3
- Home stadium: Darrell K Royal–Texas Memorial Stadium (Capacity: 94,113)

2008 Big 12 Conference football standings
| | Conf. | | | Overall |
| Team | W | | L | W | | L |
|---|---|---|---|---|---|---|
North Division
| No. 19 Missouri xy | 5 | – | 3 | 10 | – | 4 |
| Nebraska x | 5 | – | 3 | 9 | – | 4 |
| Kansas | 4 | – | 4 | 8 | – | 5 |
| Colorado | 2 | – | 6 | 5 | – | 7 |
| Kansas State | 2 | – | 6 | 5 | – | 7 |
| Iowa State | 0 | – | 8 | 2 | – | 10 |
South Division
| No. 5 Oklahoma xy$ | 7 | – | 1 | 12 | – | 2 |
| No. 4 Texas x% | 7 | – | 1 | 12 | – | 1 |
| No. 12 Texas Tech x | 7 | – | 1 | 11 | – | 2 |
| No. 16 Oklahoma State | 5 | – | 3 | 9 | – | 4 |
| Baylor | 2 | – | 6 | 4 | – | 8 |
| Texas A&M | 2 | – | 6 | 4 | – | 8 |
Championship: Oklahoma 62, Missouri 21
$ – BCS representative as conference champion; % – BCS at-large representative; x – Division champion/co-champions; y – Championship game participant; Rankings from AP Poll

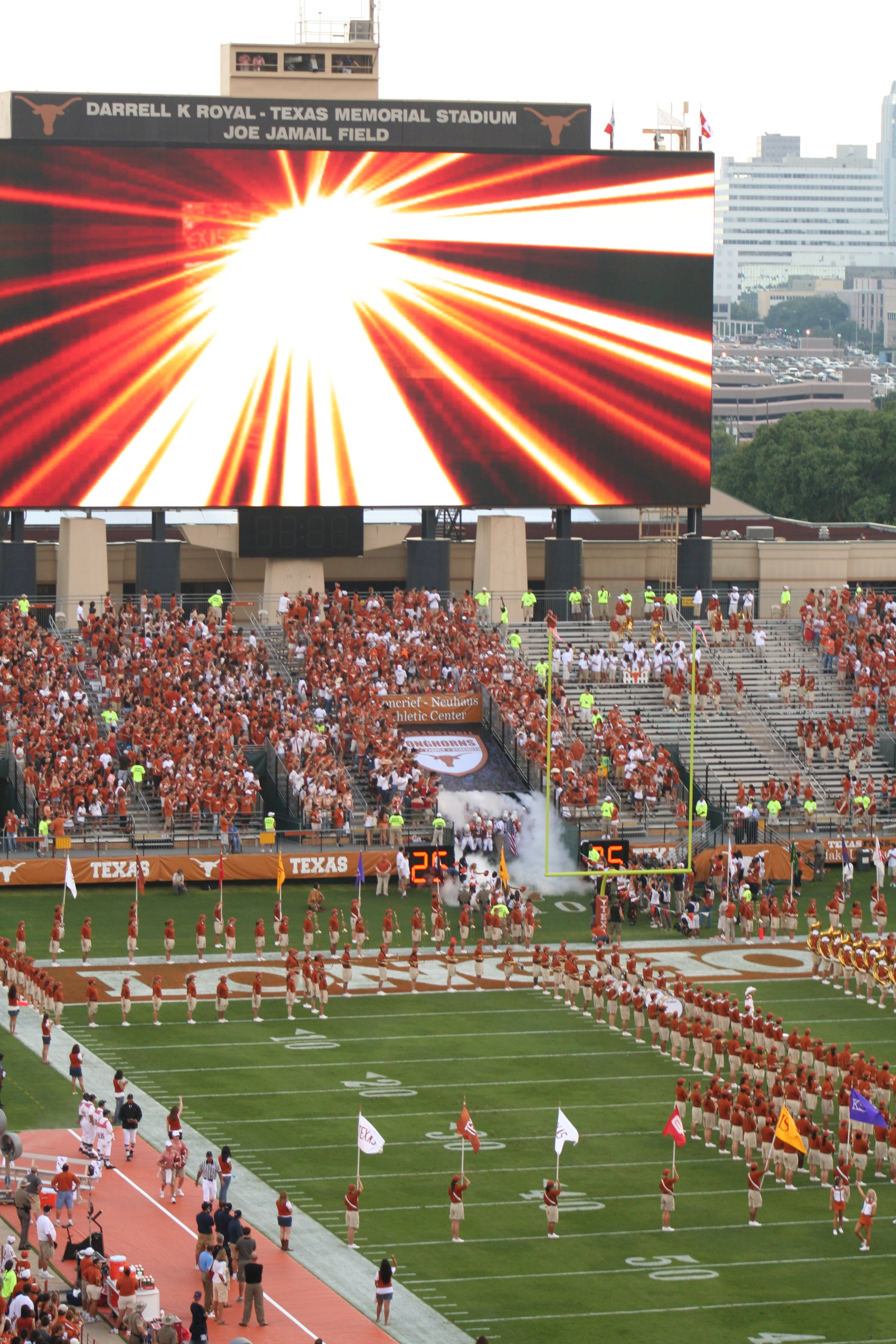
The 2008 Longhorns take the field on opening day.

The 2008 Texas Longhorns football team represented the University of Texas at Austin in the 2008 NCAA Division I FBS football season. The team was coached by Mack Brown, and played their home games in Darrell K Royal–Texas Memorial Stadium, which during 2006–2008 was undergoing renovations to improve older sections as well as to add extra seating capacity.

The team entered the season ranked 10th in the USA Today Coaches' Poll. They won their first four games to rise to number 5 in the national rankings. Texas began Big 12 Conference play on October 4, 2008 with a trip to Boulder, Colorado and a win over the Colorado Buffaloes. On October 11, 2008 they upset the number-one ranked Oklahoma Sooners at the Cotton Bowl, in Dallas, Texas, in the 103rd Red River Shootout and Texas moved into the number-one spot in the polls the next day. One week later, defending the number-one ranking in a home game for the first time since 1977, the Longhorns beat the number-eleven ranked Missouri Tigers. The following day, Texas was ranked #1 in the first Bowl Championship Series (BCS) rankings released during the 2008 season. The next week, the Longhorns beat previously undefeated Oklahoma State, who were ranked #6 in the BCS at the time.

Texas lost a close road game against Texas Tech, who were undefeated at 8–0 and ranked #5 in the BCS ranking. As a result, the Longhorns fell to #7 in the Coach's poll while the Red Raiders rose to #3. Texas fell to #4 in the BCS Standings, keeping alive the possibility they could still play for the national championship if other top teams stumble. Next, the Longhorns won a home game against Baylor and a road-game against Kansas, who were previously ranked but had fallen out of the polls since losing to Texas Tech. Oklahoma defeated Texas Tech, which returned Texas to a #2 ranking in the BCS and created a three-way tie (Texas, Texas Tech, Oklahoma) in the Big 12 South.

The final regular-season opponent for Texas was in-state rival Texas A&M, part of the Lone Star Showdown. The Longhorns won 49–9, the largest margin of victory in the rivalry in 110 years. Despite this victory, Oklahoma moved past Texas in the BCS rankings. The three-way tie was resolved by the fifth tie-breaker so Oklahoma advanced to the Big 12 Championship instead of Texas. This was controversial since Texas had beaten both Oklahoma and Missouri (the Big 12 North champion) during the regular season. Texas finished out the season with a 24-21 win over Ohio State in the 2009 Fiesta Bowl.

== Before the season ==
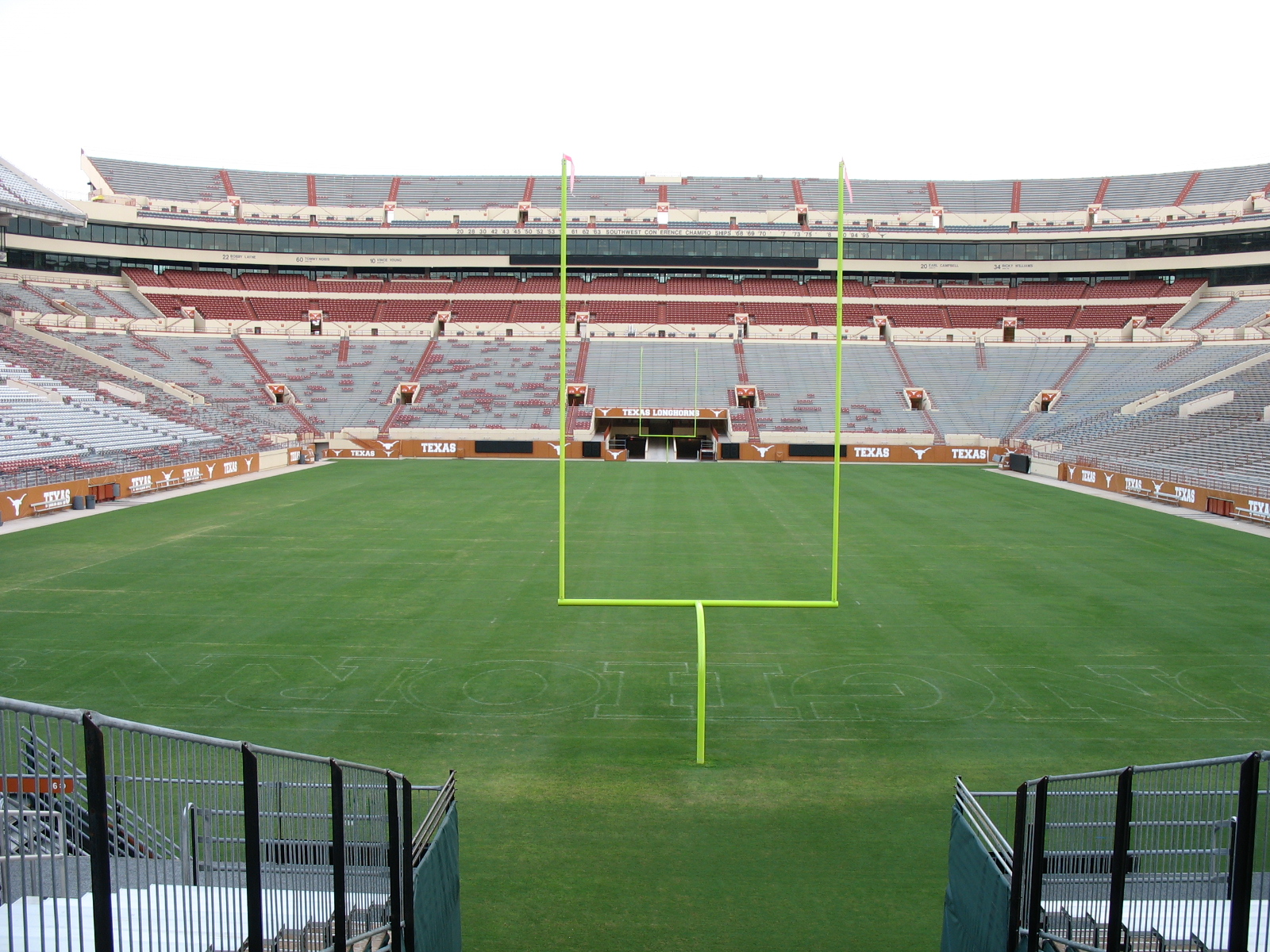
The North end zone after stadium expansion, shown during the summer prior to the 2008 season

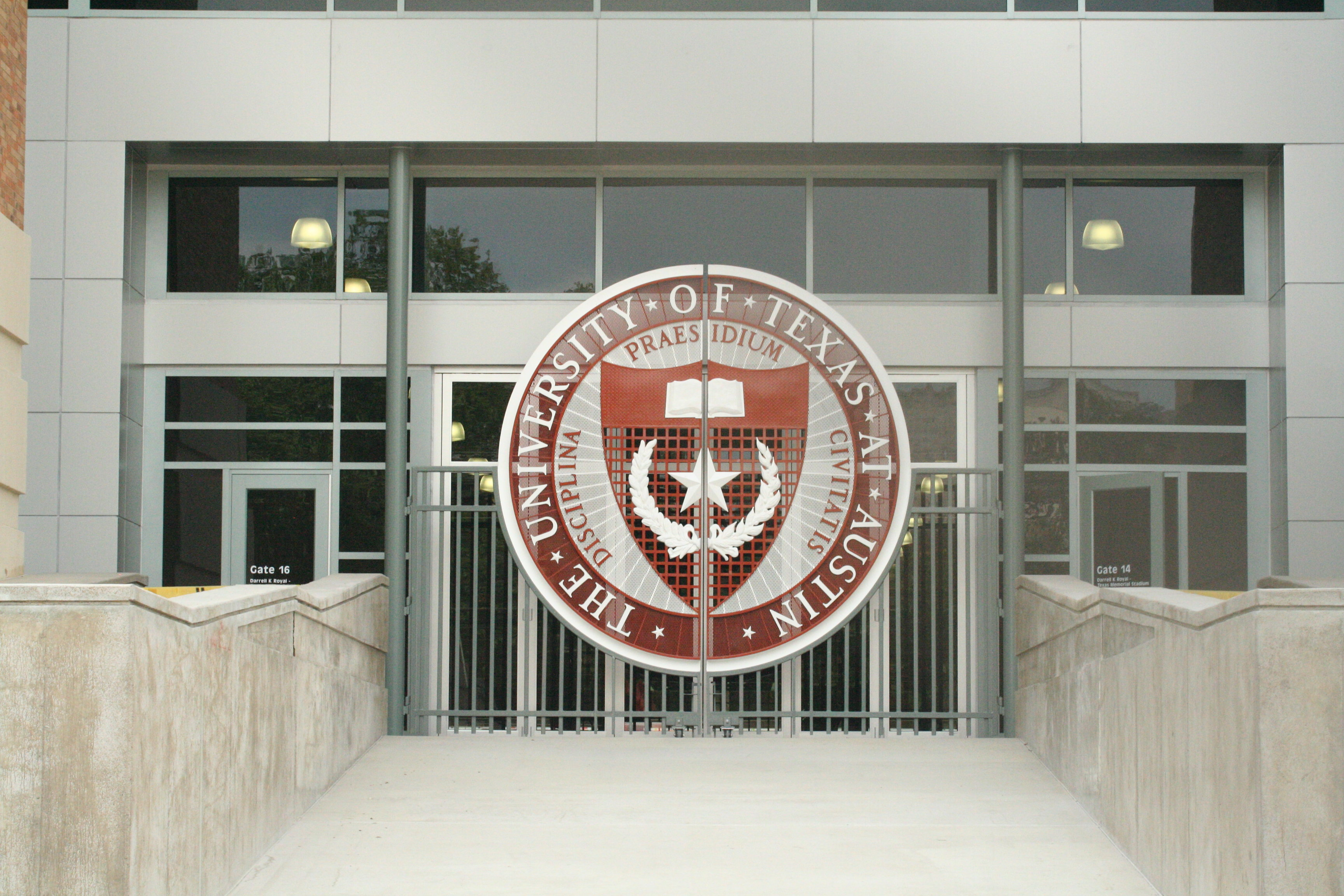
The new North end zone entry gate is shown as it appeared on the morning of the season opener against FAU.

The Longhorns have enjoyed considerable success in recent seasons. Mack Brown's Longhorns won at least 10 games in each of the previous 7 seasons (2001–2007); that is the longest active streak in the nation. The 2004 team had the first Bowl Championship Series win for any Texas team and the 2005 team won the National Championship (the fourth for the Texas football program). The 2006 team finished with 10 wins, 3 losses, including a victory in the 2006 Alamo Bowl. They received a final-ranking of 13th in the nation by both the Associated Press AP Poll and the USA Today Coaches' Poll

Texas entered the 2007 season ranked third in the all-time list of both total wins and winning percentage. The 2007 team was ranked in the Top 10 by numerous pre-season polls. For instance, a pre-season ranking by ESPN writer Mark Schlabach had the Longhorns ranked eighth; Rivals.com had them at ninth. College Football News and Real Football 365 both had Texas ranked third in the pre-season. The Longhorns came into the season ranked fourth in both the Coaches' Poll and AP Poll. Texas started out 4–0, but with sloppy playing, edging out 4 unranked teams. Texas came particularly close to being upset when the beat unranked UCF, 38–35. Texas then suffered losses to Kansas State (41–21) and Oklahoma (28–21). Texas then surged back, winning five games in a row. At 9–2, they were poised to gain a BCS bowl berth. However, a 30–38 loss to Texas A&M dashed these hopes. The Longhorns finished the season 10–3 with a victory in the 2007 Holiday Bowl. The Longhorns were ranked tenth in the final AP poll and in the USA Today Coaches' Poll.

Five Longhorns were selected in the 2008 NFL draft: Limas Sweed (53rd pick), Jamaal Charles (73rd), Jermichael Finley (91st), Tony Hills (130th), and Frank Okam (151st). In addition, Brandon Foster, Marcus Griffin, Nate Jones and Derek Lokey agreed to sign free-agent contracts with NFL teams.

Both Jamaal Charles and Jermichael Finley skipped their senior year in order to enter the NFL early. The loss of Charles was a particularly hard blow to the team. Despite skipping his senior year, Charles ranks fourth on the list of total rushing yards by a UT player, behind Ricky Williams, Cedric Benson, and Earl Campbell, with 3,328 yards. Williams and Campbell each won the Heisman Trophy in their senior seasons. With Charles' departure, quarterback Colt McCoy becomes the leading returning rusher for the Longhorns. Tight end Jermichael Finley also declared he would forgo his senior season to enter the NFL.

Texas entered the 2008 season ranked number 11 in the AP Poll and number 10 in the Coaches' Poll.

=== Facilities and equipment ===
Following the final home game of 2006, construction workers demolished the north end of Darrell K. Royal-Texas Memorial Stadium. This section was rebuilt to make the lowest seats closer to the field while adding luxury boxes and an upper-deck. The lower deck of the expansion was completed for 2007, and the upper deck and remaining renovations were ready for 2008. The modifications put the north end-zone seats thirty yards closer to the field of play. This results in several game day changes, such as Smokey the Cannon moving to the south end-zone near Bevo. Texas worked with Bluetooth SIG to deploy Bluetooth kiosks throughout the stadium. These kiosks will broadcast free game-day information to Bluetooth-enabled cell-phones in the stands.

For the second straight year in 2006–2007, Texas merchandise products were the top-selling products among clients of Collegiate Licensing Company.

=== Coaches ===
In 2007, the University of Texas Board of Regents voted unanimously to raise head coach Mack Brown's salary by $300,000. This brings his annual compensation to $2.81 million and keeps him among the five highest paid coaches in the sport. The package also includes up to $3 million in bonuses, including "$100,000 if he wins the Big 12 Championship and $450,000 if he wins this year's national championship, as well as bonuses based on the percent of players who graduate." Brown's contract is good through the 2016 season and includes buy-out clauses should another school attempt to hire Brown.

Greg Davis is the team's offensive coordinator and quarterbacks coach; As of 2008 Davis is in his eleventh season at Texas. In 2007, Duane Akina was the defensive co-coordinator along with Larry Mac Duff. Mac Duff left Texas at the end of the 2007 season and Akina was demoted to "Assistant Head Coach/Defensive Backs". The Longhorns hired Will Muschamp as defensive coordinator; he will also coach linebackers in 2008. Muschamp was previously defensive coordinator at Auburn and will make a $425,000 salary at Texas. Running backs coach Ken Rucker transferred to a newly created position with the athletic department where he will act as a liaison to high school athletic programs. On January 16, 2008 Texas replaced Rucker by hiring former Texas quarterback Major Applewhite.

On November 18, 2008, The University of Texas announced that Will Muschamp would eventually succeed Mack Brown as head football coach. They agreed in principle to increase Muschamp's salary to $900,000. There was no timetable set for Brown's departure, and both Brown and UT said they expected Brown to stay a long time. Austin American-Statesman commentator Kirk Bohls stated, "Muschamp's ascension conveys to fans and recruits that Texas values what it has now as one of the elite programs in the country and wants to maintain. This smart, bold move should bring coaching stability, sustained recruiting and possibly expanded recruiting into the Southeast and a continued framework for success."

== Schedule ==
| Date | Time | Opponent | Rank | Site | TV | Result | Attendance |
|---|---|---|---|---|---|---|---|
| August 30 | 6:00 p.m. | Florida Atlantic* | No. 11 | Darrell K Royal–Texas Memorial Stadium; Austin, TX | FSN PPV | W 52–10 | 98,053^{A} |
| September 6 | 9:15 p.m. | at UTEP* | No. 10 | Sun Bowl Stadium; El Paso, TX | ESPN2 | W 42–13 | 53,415^{B} |
| September 20 | 6:00 p.m. | Rice* | No. 7 | Darrell K Royal–Texas Memorial Stadium; Austin, TX (rivalry) | FSN | W 52–10 | 97,201 |
| September 27 | 2:30 p.m. | Arkansas^{C}* | No. 7 | Darrell K Royal–Texas Memorial Stadium; Austin, TX (rivalry) | ABC | W 52–10 | 97,833 |
| October 4 | 6:00 p.m. | at Colorado | No. 5 | Folsom Field; Boulder, CO | FSN | W 38–14 | 53,927 |
| October 11 | 11:00 a.m. | vs. No. 1 Oklahoma | No. 5 | Cotton Bowl; Dallas, TX (Red River Rivalry) (College GameDay) | ABC | W 45–35 | 92,182^{D} |
| October 18 | 7:00 p.m. | No. 11 Missouri | No. 1 | Darrell K Royal–Texas Memorial Stadium; Austin, TX (College GameDay) | ABC | W 56–31 | 98,383^{E} |
| October 25 | 2:30 p.m. | No. 7 Oklahoma State | No. 1 | Darrell K Royal–Texas Memorial Stadium; Austin, TX | ABC | W 28–24 | 98,518^{F} |
| November 1 | 7:00 p.m. | at No. 7 Texas Tech | No. 1 | Jones AT&T Stadium; Lubbock, TX (Battle for the Chancellor's Spurs) (College GameDay) | ABC | L 33–39 | 56,333^{G} |
| November 8 | 11:00 a.m. | Baylor | No. 5 | Darrell K Royal–Texas Memorial Stadium; Austin, TX (rivalry) | FSN | W 45–21 | 97,715 |
| November 15 | 11:30 a.m. | at Kansas | No. 4 | Memorial Stadium; Lawrence, KS | FSN | W 35–7 | 51,930 |
| November 27 | 7:00 p.m. | Texas A&M | No. 4 | Darrell K Royal–Texas Memorial Stadium; Austin, TX (rivalry) | ESPN | W 49–9 | 98,621^{H} |
| January 5, 2009 | 7:00 p.m. | vs. No. 10 Ohio State* | No. 3 | University of Phoenix Stadium; Glendale, AZ (Fiesta Bowl) | FOX | W 24–21 | 72,047 |
*Non-conference game; Rankings from Coaches' Poll released prior to the game; All times are in Central time

The primary source of schedule, attendance and box score information is the MackBrown-TexasFootball website.

Radio broadcast of Texas Longhorns football games is available on XM Satellite Radio channel 241.

- ^ADenotes the largest crowd to watch a football game in the state of Texas, at a Big12 Conference Stadium, or in the Southwest region.
- ^BDenotes the largest crowd ever for the Sun Bowl Stadium.
- ^COriginally scheduled for September 13, 2008, moved to September 27 due to Hurricane Ike.
- ^DDenotes the largest crowd in the history of the Red River Shootout.
- ^EDenotes the largest crowd to watch a football game in the state of Texas or at a Big12 Conference Stadium (beating record set at DKR earlier in 2008).
- ^FDenotes the largest crowd to watch a football game in the state of Texas or at a Big12 Conference Stadium (beating record set at DKR earlier in 2008).
- ^GDenotes the largest crowd ever at Jones AT&T Stadium.
- ^HDenotes the largest crowd to watch a football game in the state of Texas or at a Big12 Conference Stadium (beating record set at DKR earlier in 2008).

== Players ==
The Longhorns are led by junior Quarterback Colt McCoy, who was the starting quarterback for the Longhorns in 2006 and 2007. Rivals.com named McCoy one of the top-10 quarterbacks going into the 2007 season and he also made the Athlon Sports first-team All Big 12 McCoy has been the subject of much discussion regarding his chances of winning the 2008 Heisman Trophy. With the departure of running back Jamaal Charles for the 2008 NFL draft, McCoy became the leading returning rusher for the Longhorns.

McCoy has continued to be leading rusher in 2008; through the first 11 games of the season he rushed for a net 527 yards. The leading running backs were Vondrell McGee (347 yards), Chris Ogbonnaya (333) and Cody Johnson (234), all of whom have played in all 11 games. Despite injuries limiting him to only five games, freshman Foswhitt Whittaker rushed for 226 yards. McCoy had 3134 passing yards for a total of 3661 total yards of offense, which also led the team. The leading receivers through 11 games were Jordan Shipley (897 yards), Quan Cosby (872), Chris Ogbonnaya (458) and Lucas Hampton (428). The leading scorer was Hunter Lawrence, the place-kicker. He had made 9 of 11 field goal attempts and 52 of 52 extra points, for a total of 79 points contributed.

On defense, Roddrick Muckelroy led the team in tackles with 63 solo tackles and 39 assists. Brian Orakpo led the team in sacks, with 9 sacks for 79 yards. Ryan Palmer led the team in interceptions with 3, one of which he returned for a touchdown.

Besides Whittaker, several other Longhorns missed playing time due to sickness or injury. Cosby and Orakpo were both injured in the game vs. Texas Tech. Safety Blake Gideon suffered a head injury in the Kansas game but was expected to be healthy for the A&M game. Cornerbacks Aaron Williams missed the Kansas game with the flu and cornerback Chykie Brown missed three games due to injury. Tight end Luke Tiemann missed the season due to an ACL injury. Starting center Chris Hall missed time due to a knee sprain.

One player was suspended, and another dismissed, for off-the-field infractions. Defensive tackle Lamarr Houston was suspended for one game (vs. UTEP) for driving under the influence. Back-up center Buck Burnette was dismissed from the team for posting a racially charged message on his Facebook page after the election of Barack Obama as President of the United States. Afterwards he issued an apology saying "That lack of judgment on my part has had devastating consequences. Those that know me understand that this is not a true reflection of my character. I sincerely apologize to everyone that I have offended. I have had the opportunity to apologize to my teammates and coaches and have received support from many of them in return." Burnette's dismissal coincided with the injury to Hall, so true freshman David Snow was called upon to start at center vs. Kansas.

Jordan Shipley was a senior in 2008 but has requested an extra year of eligibility due to playing time missed due to injuries. On December 22, 2008, the NCAA granted Shipley's hardship request for a sixth season of eligibility.

=== Roster ===
| Number | Name | Height (feet-inches) | Weight (pounds) | Class | Position | Hometown city (High School) |
|---|---|---|---|---|---|---|
| 1 | Philip Payne | 6-2 | 207 | So.-SQ | WR | Garland, Texas (South Garland) |
| 1 | Keenan Robinson | 6-3 | 225 | Fr.-RS | LB | Plano, Texas (Plano East) |
| 2 | Sergio Kindle | 6-4 | 239 | Jr.-2L | LB | Dallas, Texas (Woodrow Wilson) |
| 2 | Vondrell McGee | 5-10 | 205 | So.-1L | RB | Longview, Texas (Longview) |
| 3 | Curtis Brown | 6-1 | 182 | So.-1L | CB | Gilmer, Texas (Gilmer) |
| 3 | Chris Ogbonnaya | 6-1 | 215 | Sr.-2L | RB | Missouri City, Texas (Strake Jesuit) |
| 4 | Aaron Williams | 6-1 | 175 | Fr.-HS | DB | Round Rock, Texas (McNeil) |
| 4 | Dan Buckner | 6-4 | 213 | Fr.-HS | WR | Allen, Texas (Allen) |
| 5 | Brandon Collins | 6-0 | 170 | So.-1L | WR | Brenham, Texas (Brenham) |
| 5 | Ben Wells | 6-1 | 195 | Fr.-RS | S | Beaumont, Texas (Ozen) |
| 6 | Mark Fisher* | 5-8 | 160 | Fr.-HS | DB | Carrollton, Texas (Hebron) |
| 6 | Quan Cosby | 5-11 | 200 | Sr.-3L | WR | Mart, Texas (Mart) |
| 6 | Justin Tucker | 6-1 | 175 | Fr.-HS | PK | Austin, Texas (Westlake) |
| 7 | John Chiles | 6-2 | 215 | So.-1L | QB | Dallas, Texas (Summitt) |
| 7 | Deon Beasley | 5-10 | 175 | Jr.-2L | CB | Orange, Texas (West Orange Stark) |
| 8 | Chykie Brown | 6-1 | 185 | So.-1L | CB | Houston, Texas (North Shore) |
| 8 | Jordan Shipley | 6-0 | 190 | Sr.-2L | WR | Burnet, Texas (Burnet) |
| 9 | Malcolm Williams | 6-3 | 218 | Fr.-RS | WR | Garland, Texas (Garland) |
| 11 | Jared Norton | 6-3 | 230 | Jr.-2L | LB | Rowlett, Texas (Rowlett) |
| 11 | James Kirkendoll | 5-11 | 175 | So.-1L | WR | Round Rock, Texas (Round Rock) |
| 12 | Colt McCoy | 6-3 | 210 | Jr.-2L | QB | Tuscola, Texas (Jim Ned) |
| 12 | Earl Thomas | 5-10 | 195 | Fr.-RS | S | Orange, Texas (West Orange Stark) |
| 13 | Ryan Palmer | 5-10 | 186 | Sr.-3L | CB | Arlington, Texas (Bowie) |
| 13 | Ahmard Howard | 6-4 | 248 | Fr.-RS | DE | Brenham, Texas (Brenham) |
| 14 | Rocky Hamden | 6-0 | 210 | Fr.-RS | S | Stockton, CA (Weston Ranch) |
| 14 | John Paul Floyd* | 6-1 | 175 | Fr.-HS | QB | Lubbock, Texas (Monterey) |
| 15 | Trevor Walker* | 6-2 | 195 | So.-SQ | QB | Mount Pleasant, Texas (Mount Pleasant) |
| 15 | Hunter Lawrence | 6-0 | 185 | Jr.-2L | K | Boerne, Texas (Boerne) |
| 16 | Ian Harris | 6-4 | 250 | Fr.-RS | TE | San Antonio, Texas (Churchill) |
| 16 | Ford Lakin* | 6-1 | 195 | Fr.-HS | QB | Houston, Texas (Klein Forest) |
| 17 | Trevor Gerland | 6-2 | 195 | Jr.-1L | P | Katy, Texas (Cinco Ranch) |
| 17 | Sherrod Harris | 6-3 | 215 | So.-SQ | QB | Arlington, Texas (Bowie) |
| 18 | Emmanuel Acho | 6-2 | 220 | Fr.-HS | LB | Dallas, Texas (St. Mark's) |
| 18 | Josh Marshall | 6-4 | 235 | So.-SQ | TE | Arlington, Texas (Martin) |
| 19 | Blaine Irby | 6-3 | 235 | So.-1L | TE | Camarillo, California (St. Bonaventure) |
| 19 | Ishie Oduegwu | 5-10 | 206 | Jr.-2L | S | Denton, Texas (Ryan) |
| 21 | Blake Gideon | 6-1 | 197 | Fr.-HS | S | Leander, Texas (Leander) |
| 21 | Michael Summerville* | 5-11 | 165 | Fr.-HS | K | Garland, Texas (Naaman Forest) |
| 23 | Tre' Newton | 6-0 | 193 | Fr.-HS | RB | Southlake, Texas (Carroll) |
| 23 | Christian Scott | 6-1 | 205 | Fr.-RS | S | Dallas, Texas (Skyline) |
| 24 | Clark Ford* | 5-10 | 185 | Jr.-HS | DB | Richmond, Texas (B.F. Terry) |
| 24 | Antwan Cobb | 6-0 | 215 | So.-1L | RB | Pflugerville, Texas (Pflugerville) |
| 25 | Sam Walker* | 6-0 | 175 | Fr.-HS | DB | Mount Pleasant, Texas (Mount Pleasant) |
| 25 | Jeremy Hills | 6-0 | 187 | Fr.-HS | RB | Houston, Texas (Alief Elsik) |
| 26 | D.J. Monroe | 5-9 | 165 | Fr.-HS | WR | Angleton, Texas (Angleton) |
| 27 | Martin Egwuagu* | 5-10 | 190 | Sr.-SQ | DB | Austin, Texas (LBJ) |
| 27 | Nolan Brewster | 6-2 | 210 | Fr.-HS | DB | Denver, Colo. (Mullen) |
| 28 | Foswhitt Whittaker | 5-10 | 190 | Fr.-RS | RB | Houston, Texas (Pearland) |
| 28 | Ryan Zych* | 5-10 | 175 | Fr.-RS | WR | Plano, Texas (Plano East) |
| 29 | Jorge Martinez* | 6-0 | 200 | So.-SQ | DB | Brownsville, Texas (St. Joseph Academy) |
| 30 | Chris Wieland* | 5-9 | 170 | Sr.-SQ | WR | Cedar Park, Texas (Cedar Park) |
| 30 | Ryan Roberson | 5-10 | 226 | Fr.-HS | LB | Brenham, Texas (Brenham) |
| 31 | Cody Johnson | 5-11 | 255 | Fr.-RS | RB | Waller, Texas (Waller) |
| 31 | Cody Hill* | 5-10 | 175 | Fr.-RS | DB | Lubbock, Texas (Monterey) |
| 32 | Eddie Jones | 6-3 | 255 | So.-1L | DE | Kilgore, Texas (Kilgore) |
| 32 | John Stell* | 5-11 | 170 | Fr.-RS | WR | Richmond, Texas (Strake Jesuit) |
| 33 | Lamarr Houston | 6-2 | 279 | Jr.-2L | DE | Colorado Springs, Colo. (Doherty) |
| 37 | Henry Melton | 6-3 | 260 | Sr.-3L | DE | Grapevine, Texas (Grapevine) |
| 38 | Roddrick Muckelroy | 6-2 | 235 | Jr.-2L | LB | Hallsville, Texas (Hallsville) |
| 38 | Levi Gage* | 5-10 | 187 | Sr.-SQ | RB | Caldwell, Texas (Caldwell) |
| 39 | Ryan Bailey | 6-2 | 205 | Jr.-2L | PK | Austin, Texas (Anderson) |
| 40 | Alex Spears* | 5-6 | 190 | Sr.-SQ | FB | Houston, Texas (Katy Taylor) |
| 41 | Jamison Berryhill* | 5-11 | 215 | Fr.-HS | FB | Odessa, Texas (Permian) |
| 42 | Dustin Earnest | 6-3 | 233 | So.-1L | LB | Texarkana, Texas (Texas) |
| 43 | Chris Krychev* | 6-2 | 250 | Fr.-HS | RB | Danville, California (Monte Vista) |
| 43 | Dravannti Johnson | 6-2 | 220 | Fr.-HS | LB | Nederland, Texas (Nederland) |
| 44 | Rashad Bobino | 5-11 | 230 | Sr.-3L | LB | La Marque, Texas (La Marque) |
| 45 | Nic Redwine | 6-3 | 230 | Sr.-1L | DE | Tyler, Texas (Lee) |
| 46 | Aaron Smith* | 6-2 | 220 | Fr.-RS | LB | Palestine, Texas (Palestine) |
| 46 | Drew Marcantonio* | 6-1 | 205 | Sr.-SQ | FB | Corpus Christi, Texas (Flour Bluff) |
| 47 | John Gold* | 6-3 | 210 | So.-SQ | P | Palestine, Texas (Palestine) |
| 48 | Jarrod Ochoa* | 5-10 | 230 | Jr.-SQ | LB | Abilene, Texas (Cooper) |
| 48 | Alex Zumberge* | 6-0 | 245 | Fr.-RS | DS | Houston, Texas (Houston Christian) |
| 49 | Luke Tiemann | 6-2 | 240 | Sr.-2L | FB | Pflugerville, Texas (Pflugerville) |
| 50 | Milton Sampson* | 6-2 | 235 | Fr.-HS | DE | Galveston, Texas (Ball) |
| 52 | Charlie Tanner | 6-4 | 305 | Jr.-2L | OG | Austin, Texas (Anderson) |
| 52 | Cory Michner | 6-0 | 215 | Sr.-SQ | DE | St. Louis, Mo. (Ladue) |
| 53 | Greg Smith | 6-4 | 295 | So.-1L | TE/OT | Montgomery, Texas (Montgomery) |
| 54 | Mark Buchanan | 6-6 | 295 | Fr.-HS | OL | Austin, Texas (Austin) |
| 55 | Rene Hinojosa* | 6-2 | 255 | Jr.-SQ | DT | Weslaco, Texas (Weslaco East) |
| 55 | Cedric Dockery | 6-4 | 315 | Sr.-3L | OG | Garland, Texas (Lakeview Centennial) |
| 56 | Tray Allen | 6-5 | 310 | So.-1L | OT | Grand Prairie, Texas (South Grand Prairie) |
| 57 | Andrew Carroll* | 6-3 | 300 | So.-SQ | OL | Montgomery, Texas (Montgomery) |
| 58 | William Harvey* | 5-11 | 235 | Jr.-1L | DS | Houston, Texas (Memorial) |
| 59 | Chad Kugler* | 6-2 | 220 | Sr.-SQ | LB | Richardson, Texas (Berkner) |
| 63 | Michael Huey | 6-5 | 315 | So.-1L | OG | Kilgore, Texas (Kilgore) |
| 64 | Kyle Hix | 6-7 | 320 | So.-1L | OT | Aledo, Texas (Aledo) |
| 68 | Drew Oldis* | 6-4 | 285 | So.-SQ | OG | Boerne, Texas (Boerne) |
| 71 | Chris Hall | 6-4 | 300 | Jr.-2L | OL | Irving, Texas (Irving) |
| 72 | Britt Mitchell | 6-5 | 300 | So.-1L | OG | Kilgore, Texas (Kilgore) |
| 74 | Adam Ulatoski | 6-8 | 302 | Jr.-2L | OT | Southlake, Texas (Carroll) |
| 75 | Steve Moore | 6-5 | 300 | So.-SQ | OG | Houston, Texas (Jersey Village) |
| 76 | Aundre McGaskey | 6-5 | 290 | Fr.-RS | OT | La Marque, Texas (La Marque) |
| 77 | Luke Poehlmann | 6-7 | 257 | Fr.-HS | OL | Brenham, Texas (Brenham) |
| 78 | David Snow | 6-4 | 300 | Fr.-HS | C/OG | Gilmer, Texas (Gilmer) |
| 80 | Daniel Orr* | 6-0 | 186 | Sr.-SQ | WR | Corsicana, Texas (Corsicana) |
| 81 | Sam Acho | 6-3 | 258 | So.-1L | DE | Dallas, Texas (St. Mark's) |
| 81 | C.A. Vergari* | 6-3 | 205 | Jr.-SQ | WR | Bronxville, N.Y. (Bronxville) |
| 82 | Joseph Davis* | 6-5 | 215 | Fr.-HS | WR | Somerset, Texas (Somerset) |
| 83 | Brock Fitzhenry | 5-9 | 171 | Fr.-HS | WR | Giddings, Texas (Giddings) |
| 84 | DeSean Hales | 5-11 | 175 | Fr.-HS | WR | Klein, Texas (Oak) |
| 84 | Foster Vimont* | 6-4 | 230 | Fr.-HS | TE | Ras Tanura, Saudi Arabia (Stony Brook [N.Y.]) |
| 85 | D.J. Grant | 6-3 | 210 | Fr.-HS | WR | Austin, Texas (LBJ) |
| 86 | Lucas Hampton | 6-0 | 270 | Sr.-3L | TE | Flower Mound, Texas (Flower Mound) |
| 87 | Patrick McNamara* | 6-4 | 200 | Fr.-HS | WR | Lubbock, Texas (Monterey) |
| 88 | Mac McWhorter* | 6-4 | 250 | Jr.-2L | TE | Austin, Texas (Westwood) |
| 89 | William Ruefle* | 6-2 | 243 | Sr.-TR | TE | Mesquite, Texas (North Mesquite) |
| 91 | Kheeston Randall | 6-5 | 275 | Fr.-HS | DT | Beaumont, Texas (Kelly) |
| 92 | Ben Alexander | 6-0 | 310 | Jr.-2L | DT | Anderson, South Carolina (T.L. Hanna) |
| 93 | Tyrell Higgins* | 6-3 | 255 | Fr.-RS | DT | Schertz, Texas (Clemens) |
| 94 | Michael Wilcoxon | 6-3 | 285 | Fr.-RS | DT | Aledo, Texas (Aledo) |
| 95 | Aaron Lewis | 6-4 | 270 | Sr.-3L | DE | Albuquerque, N.M. (La Cueva) |
| 96 | Jarvis Humphrey | 6-2 | 290 | Fr.-HS | DT | Cedar Hill, Texas (Cedar Hill) |
| 97 | Russell Carter | 6-3 | 240 | Fr.-RS | DE | Houston, Texas (Westbury) |
| 98 | Brian Orakpo | 6-4 | 260 | Sr.-3L | DE | Houston, Texas (Lamar) |
| 99 | Roy Miller | 6-2 | 295 | Sr.-3L | DT | Killeen, Texas (Shoemaker) |

Terms:

- Fr.=Freshman = a first year player
- So.=Sophomore = a second year player
- Jr.=Junior = a player in his third year
- Sr.=Senior = a player in his fourth year
- HS.=High School, a player just out of high school. A player can sit out a year, in which case they have a redshirt.
- 1L, 2L, 3L = number of years the player has lettered in football

An * indicates that the player is a "walk-on" (a non-scholarship player)

Source: "2008 Roster". University of Texas at Austin Department of Athletics. Archived from the original on December 3, 2008.

=== Recruiting ===
Texas signed 20 overall recruits for the 2008 recruiting class. Twelve 4-stars (DeSean Hales, Jarvis Humphrey, D.J. Monroe, Aaron Williams, Mark Buchanan, Dan Buckner, Nolan Brewster, Derrick "D.J." Grant, Jeremy Hills, Dravannti Johnson, Kheeston Randall and David Snow), seven 3-stars (Emmanuel Acho, Antoine Hicks, Tre' Newton, Luke Poehlmann, Ryan Roberson, Brock Fitzhenry and Justin Tucker) and two 2-star (Blake Gideon and Rocky Hamden) according to Rivals' recruiting service, and two 5-stars (Aaron Williams and Dan Buckner), eleven 4-stars (David Snow, Dravannti Johnson, Nolan Brewster, Jarvis Humphrey, DeSean Hales, Ryan Roberson, Derrick "D.J." Grant, Luke Poehlmann, D.J. Monroe, Jeremy Hills and Mark Buchanan), six 3-stars (Emmanuel Acho, Brock Fitzhenry, Kheeston Randall, Blake Gideon, Antoine Hicks and Tre' Newton) and one 2-star recruit (Justin Tucker), according to Scout's recruiting service. The class was ranked #14 on Rivals and #16 on Scout.

Texas originally also received a commitment from Southlake Carroll quarterback Riley Dodge, son of former Longhorns quarterback Todd Dodge, but Riley Dodge later chose to decommit and headed to North Texas to play under his father. Texas was also in the run for the nation's top running back prospect, five-star Darrell Scott of Ventura, California. Scott, however, picked the Colorado Buffaloes over the Longhorns on National Signing Day.

== Game summaries ==
=== Florida Atlantic ===
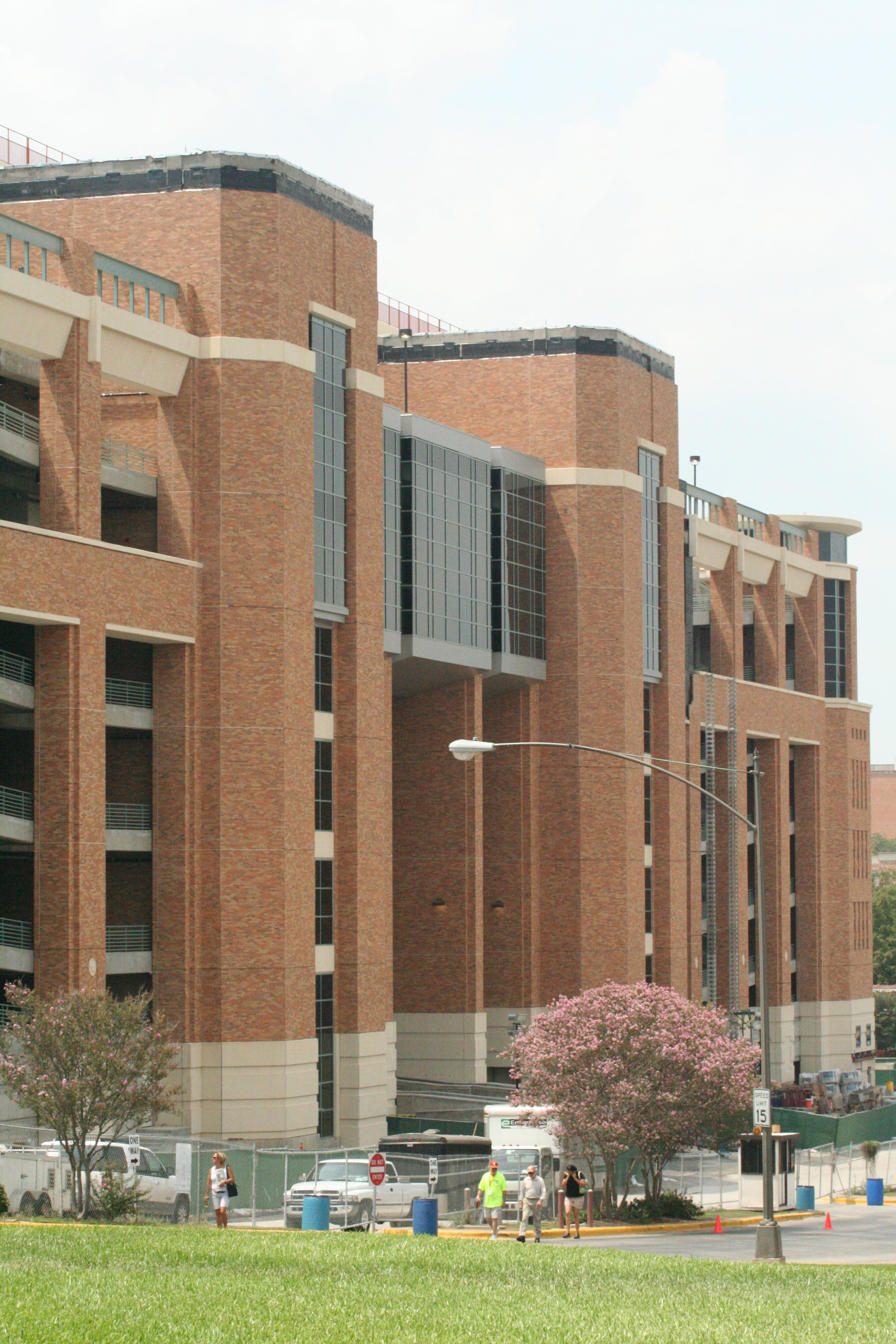
The exterior facade of the newly constructed north end zone seating as it appeared the morning of the 2008 season opener.

| | 1 | 2 | 3 | 4 | Total |
|---|---|---|---|---|---|
| Florida Atlantic | 0 | 10 | 0 | 0 | 10 |
| #10 Texas | 14 | 14 | 14 | 10 | 52 |

The 2008 game marks the first meeting between the Texas Longhorns and the Florida Atlantic Owls. Florida Atlantic first played football in 2001 and began playing football in the Sun Belt Conference in 2005. The 2007 Owls won their conference and went on to play in the 2007 New Orleans Bowl. That set a record for the shortest amount of time between a school starting college football and being invited to a bowl game. The Owls won the game 44–27.

Texas began the season with a lack of experience in some positions, such as safety. The Longhorns entered the week of the game with many questions still remaining about the starting roster. On the depth chart released to the media, eleven positions still did not have definite starters. Brown said that he might wait until 48 hours prior to kickoff to decide on key positions such as running back and fullback, and that he may decide on the punter based upon who looks best in pre-game warmups.

Texas had one player listed on the injury list. Redshirt freshman running back Fozzy Whittaker suffered a knee injury August 16, 2008 and was listed as "questionable" to be able to play. He had been competing in the off-season for a starting spot with Vondrell McGee and Chris Ogbonnaya. Whittaker is a highly anticipated player for the Longhorns due to his holding the sixth best record for a Texas high school running back.

The University of Texas retired former Texas quarterback Vince Young's jersey number 10 jersey during the pre-game ceremonies. The morning of the game, Las Vegas casinos favored Texas by 24 points. The weather forecast called for a high of 94 °F (34 °C) and a 20% chance of rain. The attendance of 98,053 set a new record for the most people to see a football game in the state of Texas.

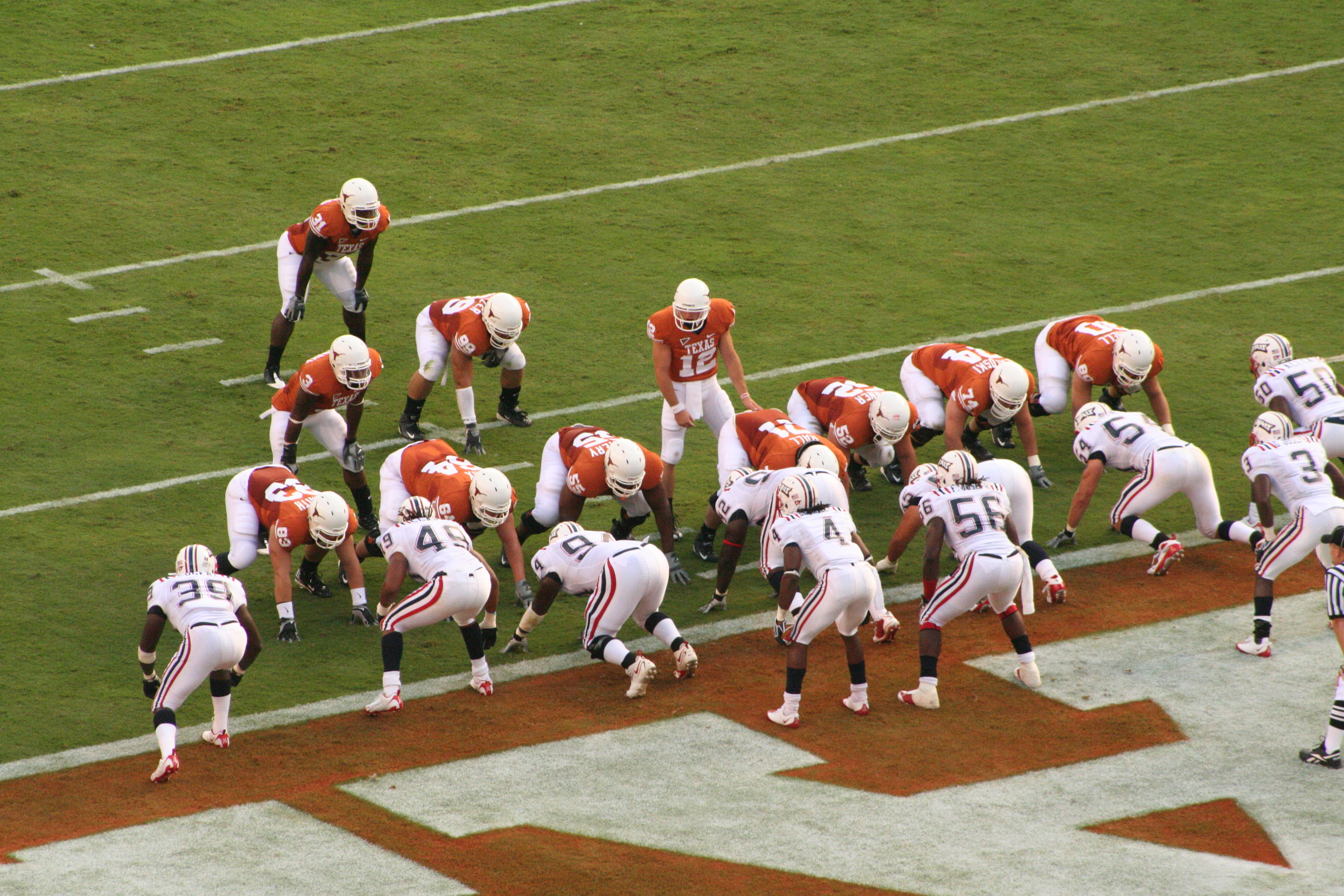
The Longhorns on offense just outside the FAU goal-line.

Texas kicked off to start the game and the kick went out of bounds for a penalty, an inauspicious beginning to the season. Due to rule changes for 2008 that gave FAU the ball on their 40-yard line. On the opening drive of the game, the Owls drove the ball 45 yards, including two completions from Rusty Smith to fullback Willie Rose and wide receiver Chris Bonner for 22 yards and 16 yards, respectively. However, inside the red zone, the drive came to a halt when the snap was botched by center David Matlock, resulting in a 21-yard fumble and turnover. The proceeding drive for the Owls also reached the red zone, but resulted in another turnover when Rusty Smith threw an interception to Texas freshman defensive back, Earl Thomas. The missed opportunities to turn successful drives into touchdowns set the tone of the game for the Owls, which would go on to turn into a blowout in favor of 10-ranked Texas.

Junior quarterback and preseason Sun Belt Conference Player of the Year, Rusty Smith threw for 253 yards and completed 15 of 31 pass attempts. Along with his interception, he threw a touchdown to tight end Rob Housler on a 20-yard hook up. Kicker Warley Leroy kicked a 31-yard field goal. Receiver Cortez Gent and tight end Jamari Grant combined for 7 completions and brought in 59 yards and 93 yards, respectively. Smith threw for more yards than McCoy, who ended with 222 yards, McCoy threw for three touchdowns and zero interceptions. McCoy also ran for a touchdown. The Owls running backs ran for 37 yards combined, while McCoy ran for 103 yards.

In the post-game press conference Schnellenberger said, "I know one thing: they are a lot tougher than we are...I was hoping I could raise the level of consciousness on my football team (so the players) could be as physical as they could become. I don't know if my remarks helped (Texas). If they did, I apologize to my team." FAU's losing-streak against ranked opponents ran to five games as the Texas Longhorns beat FAU, 52–10. The Owls are now 0–5 all-time against ranked opponents. Mack Brown improved his record for season opening games to 10–1, including nine straight years.

At approximately 3:00am the night of the game, starting defensive tackle Lamarr Houston was arrested for DWI. Brown says Houston would miss game two against UTEP, but did not say if further disciplinary action would be taken.

=== UTEP ===
| | 1 | 2 | 3 | 4 | Total |
|---|---|---|---|---|---|
| #9 Texas | 7 | 21 | 0 | 14 | 42 |
| UTEP | 6 | 7 | 0 | 0 | 13 |

This 2008 game marks the first meeting between the Longhorns and the University of Texas at El Paso Miners to occur in El Paso. Texas holds a 2–0 record against the Miners, with the most recent game occurring in 1933 when the school was known as The Texas State School of Mines and Metallurgy. Besides both being in The University of Texas System the two schools also share the same alma mater, The Eyes of Texas. While the Longhorns have the Hook 'em Horns symbol, Miners' fans make a symbol called the "Pickaxe", with pinkie and thumb extended from a closed fist. Coach Mike Price also followed the tradition of leading the team through the field carrying a large pickaxe.

The Miners opened their season with a loss to the Buffalo Bulls 42–17. Afterwards, Miners coach Mike Price said of the upcoming game against the Longhorns, "Man, I hope they're not as good as Buffalo."

The kickoff for the game was set for 8:00pm local time (Mountain Time) which is an unusually late start and which translates to 9:00pm in Austin. Sports analysts have speculated that the Miners excitement for the game, the crowd noise, the distance traveled, and time may pose a problem for Texas. They have also compared the game to Texas' 2007 road trip to Central Florida, which was a very close win for Texas. Longhorn defensive coordinator Will Muschamp said of the time slot, "Doesn't matter where we play, who we play or what time we play, Texas defense is gonna show up and play." The game was one of the most anticipated games in UTEP history and "because season-ticket packages were available for $99, some Texas fans bought them in advance to avoid the hassle of a single-game purchase. The sales pushed UTEP to nearly 24,000 season tickets, a school record."

The morning of the game, Las Vegas sports books favored Texas by 27 points. The weather forecast called for a game time temperature of 83 °F (28 °C) and mostly clear skies. The attendance was 53,415, the largest crowd ever for the Sun Bowl Stadium.

UTEP got the ball to start the game and scored a field goal. Texas was not able to secure a first down and punted back to Miners, who scored another field goal to take a 6–0 lead. On their second possession, Texas drove 80 yards for a touchdown on a McCoy pass to Quan Cosby. The extra point gave Texas a 7–6 lead which they still held at the end of the first quarter.

The Longhorns scored again ten seconds into the second quarter, as McCoy threw a 12-yard touchdown to wide receiver Dan Buckner. The Miners' Jose Martinez attempted a 65-yard field goal, but it fell short and Quan Cosby returned it 65 yards to the UTEP 35 yard-line. Texas put John Chiles in as quarterback on the next series, and fullback Cody Johnson scored his second rushing touchdown of the season to make the score 21–6. With four minutes to go in the half, McCoy threw a touchdown pass to tight end Blaine Irby to make the score 28–6 with the extra point. UTEP scored a touchdown with 18 seconds remaining in the half, making the score 28–13 at half-time.

Texas got the ball to start the second half and drove to the UTEP 14-yard line when McCoy threw an interception in the UTEP end zone; it was his first interception of the season. Neither team scored during what the Austin American-Statesman called a "sloppy" third quarter.

McCoy faked a hitch pass to Brandon Collins and instead threw downfield to Jordan Shipley to extend the lead to 35–13. On the very next play from scrimmage, Emmanuel Acho forced Tarrell Jackson to fumble and Roddrick Muckelroy retrieved the ball returned it for a touchdown, making the score 42–13. UTEP missed a field goal to end their next possession. Texas punted on their next possession, and then took over on downs when UTEP was unable to score on their last possession. The Longhorns kept the ball on the ground and ran out the clock.

=== Rice ===
| | 1 | 2 | 3 | 4 | Total |
|---|---|---|---|---|---|
| Rice | 3 | 0 | 7 | 0 | 10 |
| #7 Texas | 7 | 17 | 14 | 14 | 52 |

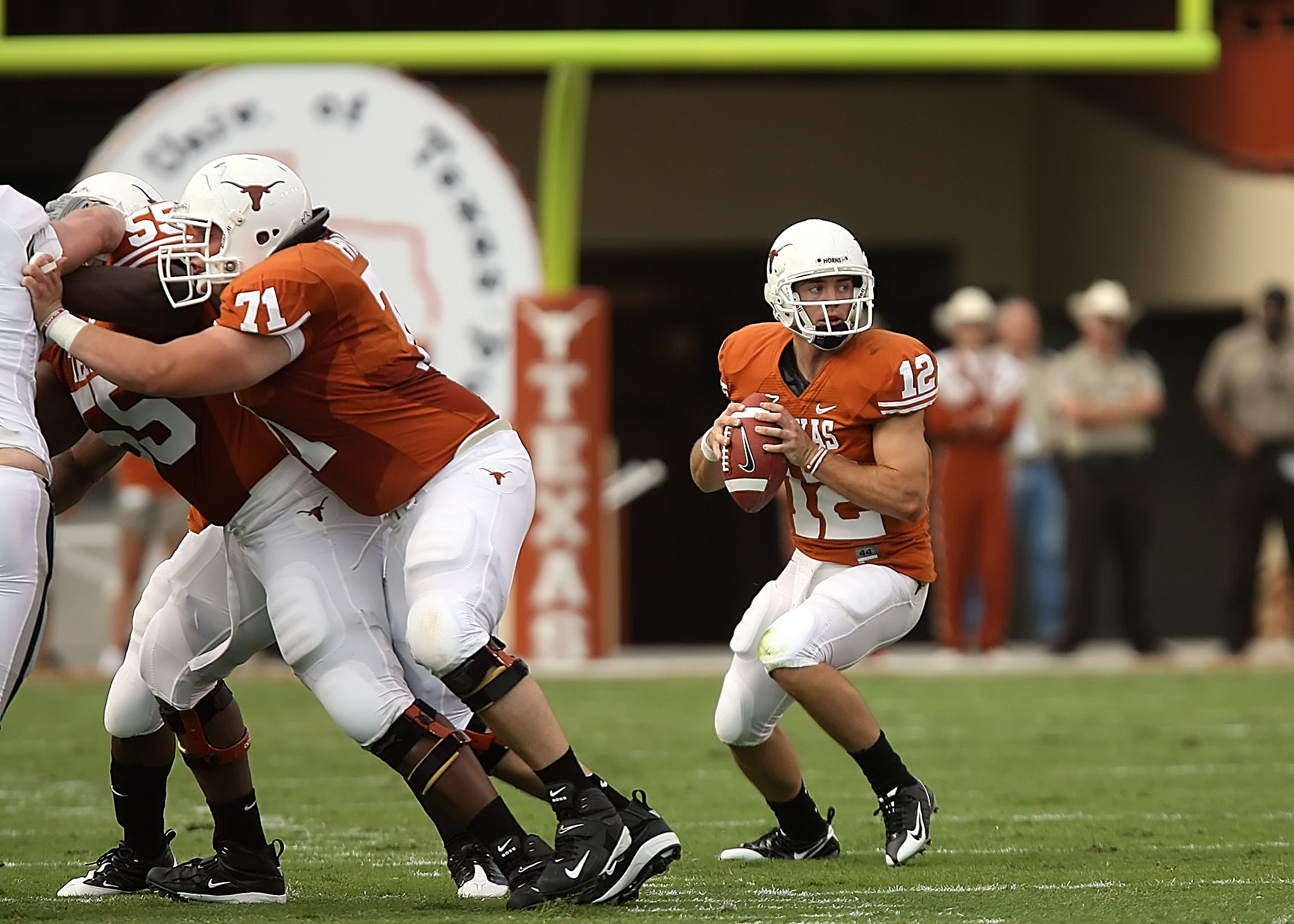
Colt McCoy (12) playing quarterback

Prior to the 2008 season, Texas and Rice had competed in football on 90 prior occasions. The series, which began in 1914, is the fourth oldest (by number of games) in Texas history. Like Arkansas, Rice once played alongside Texas in the Southwest Conference and the rivalry has continued (67 Texas wins vs 21 wins for Rice, with one tie). This was alluded to by President John F. Kennedy when he admired the challenge faced by the Rice Owls when they play Texas in Austin. Rice coach David Bailiff used this speech to motivate his team. The coach distributed wristbands bearing the letters "BIH". The letters stand for the phrase "Because it's hard". Bailiff explains that Rice plays Texas for the same reason he intends to build Rice's expectations of winning. "Because it's hard", he says, "It is hard here. But it's not impossible." Over the 47 years since Kennedy made his speech, the Owls are 2–44–1 against Texas.

In addition to continuing a traditional rivalry, playing Rice in a "home and away" series allows for Texas to play games in Houston, Texas, a city that is an important recruiting base for Rice as well as Texas, along with having a significant Texas Exes alumni population. The 2006 game was won by Texas, 52–7. Texas won the 2007 game 14–58.

The morning of the game, Las Vegas casinos favored Texas by 29 points. Texas won the game 52–10, and Colt McCoy threw 4 touchdowns to achieve a total of 62 in his career at Texas. That puts him in first place in the Texas record book, ahead of Major Applewhite (60) and Chris Simms (59).

This game was designated as the 2008 Alumni Band Day.

=== Arkansas ===
| | 1 | 2 | 3 | 4 | Total |
|---|---|---|---|---|---|
| Arkansas | 0 | 3 | 0 | 7 | 10 |
| #7 Texas | 10 | 21 | 14 | 7 | 52 |

The Arkansas Razorbacks are coached by Bobby Petrino who was introduced as the new coach on December 11, 2007. Petrino follows the ten season tenure of Houston Nutt who resigned November 26, 2007 after a year marked by off-the-field turmoil. In 1964, the Razorbacks were the only team to go through the regular season and a bowl game undefeated, and they were awarded the Football Writers Association of America National Championship. The 1969 Razorbacks, led by challenged Texas for a national championship in the Game of the Century. Texas won 15–14 to claim the national championship.

In the most recent match-up between the two programs, the 2004 Longhorns achieved a 22–20 win against an unranked Arkansas team. Texas leads the series 55–21–0. The two schools were once conference foes in the Southwest Conference

The threat of adverse weather from Hurricane Ike postponed the football game between the two programs. The game originally was scheduled to be played on September 13, 2008 and has been rescheduled for two weeks later on September 27, 2008, an open date for both teams.

The morning of the game, Las Vegas casinos favored Texas by 27 points. The temperature was 91 °F (33 °C) at kickoff, with mostly clear skies. The Longhorns won 52–10 in the most lopsided game in the Texas/Arkansas rivalry since the 1916 meeting. McCoy threw 3 touchdown passes and ran for 2 more to give him 75 in his career, third place in Longhorn history. In the fourth quarter, all the points were scored by the defensive units. Texas returned an interception 81 yards for a touchdown, and Arkansas returned a fumble 80 yards in reply.

=== Colorado ===
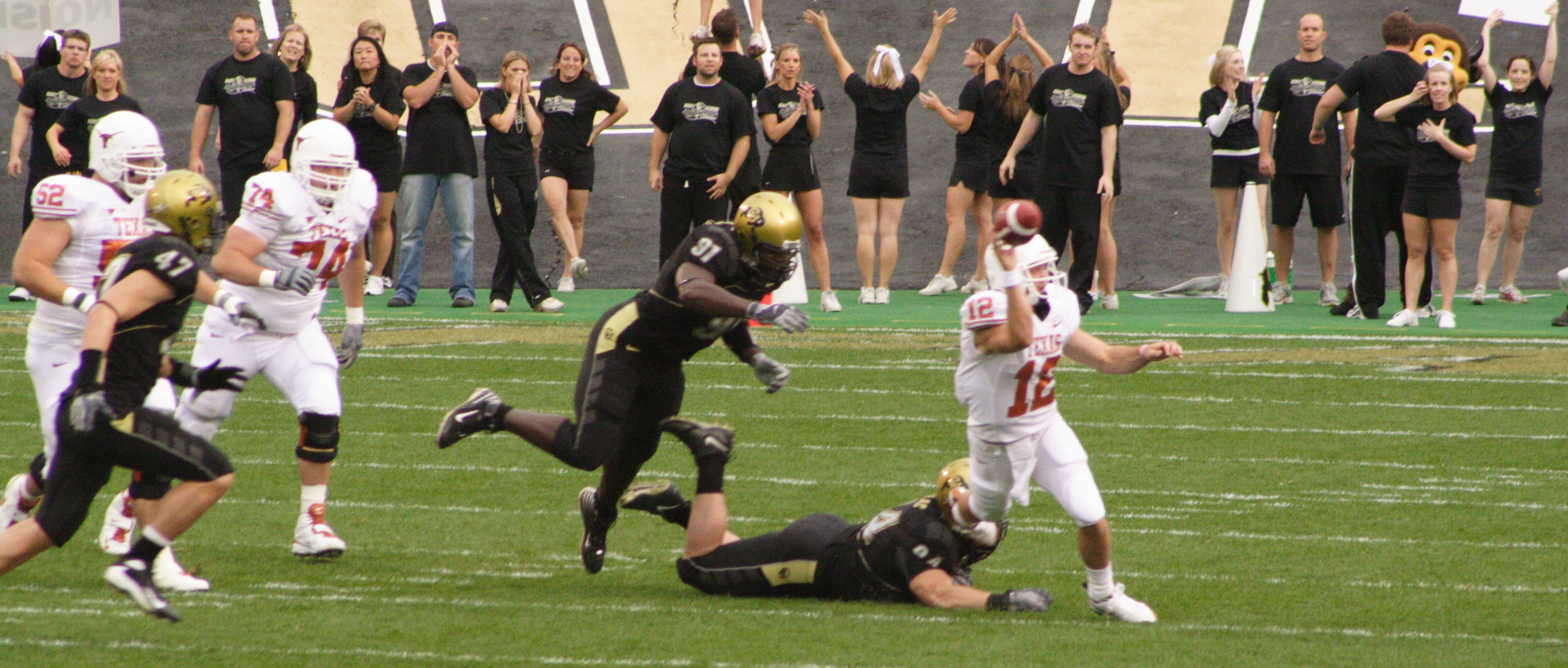
Colt McCoy throws a 65-yard touchdown pass to Chris Ogbonnaya.

| | 1 | 2 | 3 | 4 | Total |
|---|---|---|---|---|---|
| #5 Texas | 14 | 7 | 14 | 3 | 38 |
| Colorado | 0 | 0 | 7 | 7 | 14 |

Texas' most recent game against Colorado was in 2005 and they faced each other twice: once in the regular season, and once in the Big 12 Championship Game. In the first game, the Longhorns established a lead early in the game and never lost it; they led 35–10 at halftime and defeated the 2005 Colorado team by a final score of 42–17. Texas scored touchdowns on all five of their first half possessions. Vince Young had the best statistical performance of his career to date, completing 25 of 29 passing attempts for 336 yards and 2 passing touchdowns in addition to 58 yards rushing and 3 rushing touchdowns. His 86.2% completion percentage set a new single-game record for Texas, breaking his previous record of 85.7% set against Oklahoma State in 2004. After the game, Colorado Head Coach Gary Barnett said of Young's passing performance, "We can't do that in practice against air", meaning that his team would not have been able to complete 86.2% of their passes even if playing unopposed.

The championship game matched the Big 12 North Division champion against the South Division champion in a game held after the regular season has been completed. Despite losing the last two games of the regular season, Colorado retained the best record in the North Division of the Big 12 Conference. Texas won the 2005 Big12 Championship 70–3, the most lopsided score in any college football conference championship to date. Texas earned its second Big 12 football championship to make 27 conference championships total, including 25 in the Southwest Conference). The week after the game, Barnett was fired as Colorado's head coach and replaced by Dan Hawkins, the former head coach of Boise State. Entering 2008, Texas leads the series with Colorado 9–7–0.

The morning of the game, sports books favored Texas by 13 points. The weather forecast called for a game-time temperature of 64 °F (18 °C) and a 30% chance of rain, with isolated thunderstorms.

The Longhorns won 38–14. McCoy threw for two touchdowns and moved past Ricky Williams into second on Texas' all-time list for touchdowns responsible for (passing, rushing, receiving). McCoy has 77 while Williams had 76 with the Longhorns; Vince Young is in first place with 81.

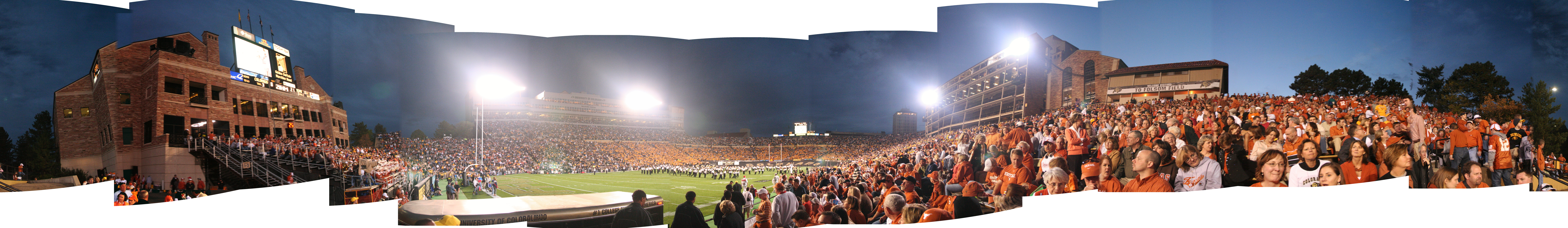
Texas at Colorado, 2008.

=== Oklahoma ===
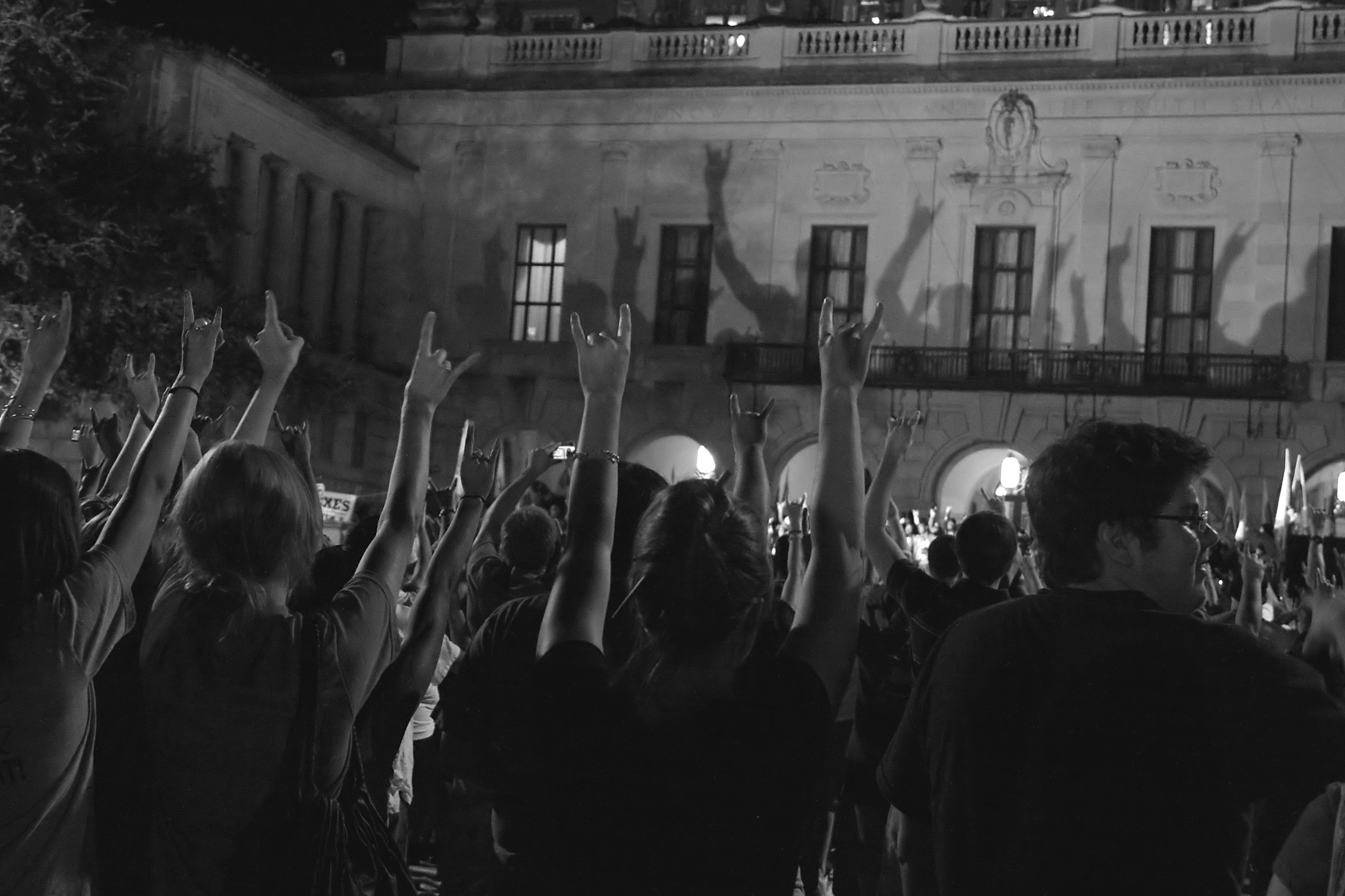
Torchlight Parade, 2007

| | 1 | 2 | 3 | 4 | Total |
|---|---|---|---|---|---|
| #5 Texas | 3 | 17 | 10 | 15 | 45 |
| #1 Oklahoma | 7 | 14 | 7 | 7 | 35 |

The game against the 2008 Oklahoma Sooners football team marked the 103rd meeting of the Red River Shootout, which has been called one of the greatest sports rivalries. It is the second longest running rivalry for the Longhorns, behind the one with Texas A&M. Since 1929 the game has been held at the Cotton Bowl in Dallas, Texas typically in mid-October with the State Fair of Texas occurring adjacent to the stadium. Prior to 2007, Texas led the series 57–39–5, including the two consecutive wins. The 2006 match-up was a 28–10 Longhorn victory.

In the week prior to facing the Oklahoma Sooners, Longhorn fans conduct their traditional Torchlight Parade and Rally. The rally first took place in 1916 prior to a game versus Texas A&M, but since 1986 it has been an annual event held exclusively during the week prior to the Texas–OU game. Another annual tradition is the running of game balls by the schools' Reserve Officer Training Corps (ROTC) programs. Each school's ROTC program uses a relay running system to run one game ball all the way from their respective campus to Dallas. Once there, they participate against each other in a football scrimmage, with the winner taking home a rivalry trophy and bragging rights.

Texas won this 103rd meeting of the Red River Shootout, 45–35. It was the highest scoring event in the history of rivalry, and it was seen by the most fans ever to attend the Red River Shootout - a record 92,182.

=== Missouri ===
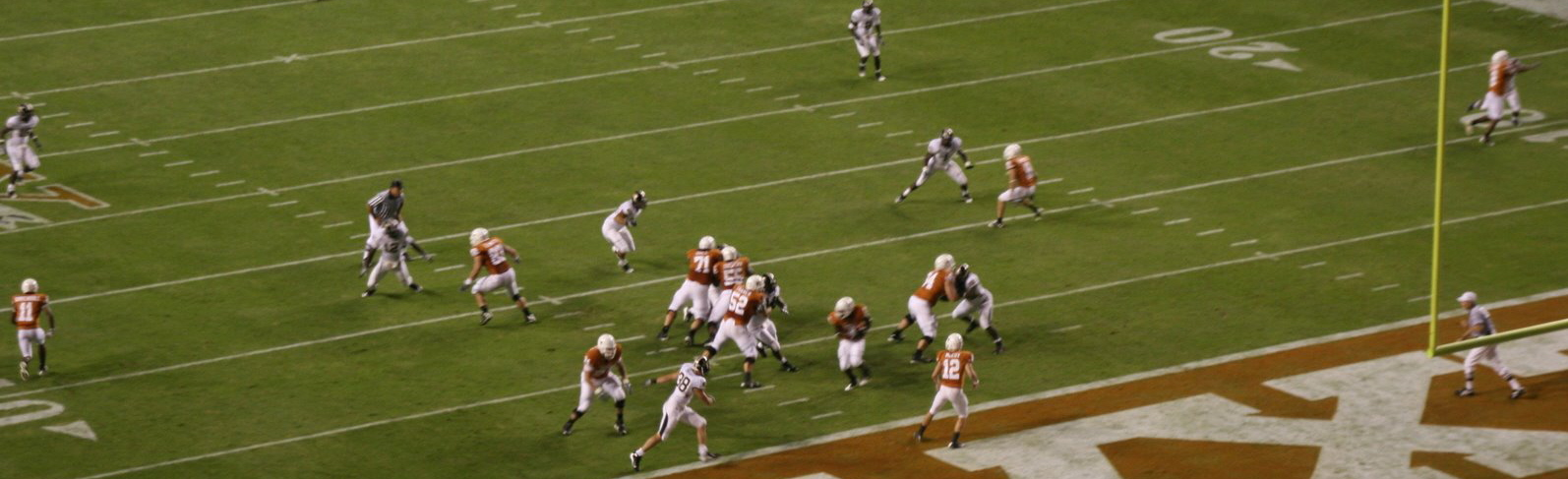
Texas' first play on offense was a shovel pass to Ogbonnaya from the Longhorn 6 yard-line. The Longhorns are shown here in a four-wide-receiver set, a formation they used to great effect against Missouri.

| | 1 | 2 | 3 | 4 | Total |
|---|---|---|---|---|---|
| #11 Missouri | 0 | 3 | 14 | 14 | 31 |
| #1 Texas | 14 | 21 | 7 | 14 | 56 |

The 2008 matchup was billed as a battle between two great quarterbacks, Colt McCoy of Texas and Chase Daniel of Missouri having both been mentioned as possible Heisman trophy candidates. Texas was playing their first home game as a number-one ranked team since 1977. Missouri won their first five games of 2008 and had moved into third place in the nation before they were upset at home by the Oklahoma State Cowboys and fell to eleventh place. The Tigers came into the game with a 0-10 record against number-one ranked teams, and they had not won a football game in Austin since 1896.

To help ensure that the Longhorns did not dwell on the emotional victory over the Sooners, the Texas coaching staff called the team together and buried the game ball in the Texas practice field on the Monday before the game. The morning of the game the betting line on the morning of the game was Texas by 4½ points; the over/under was 65. The temperature was 72 °F (22 °C) at kickoff, with clear skies. ESPN College GameDay was in Austin for the game, which set a new attendance record (University of Texas, state of Texas, Big12 Conference) of 98,383.

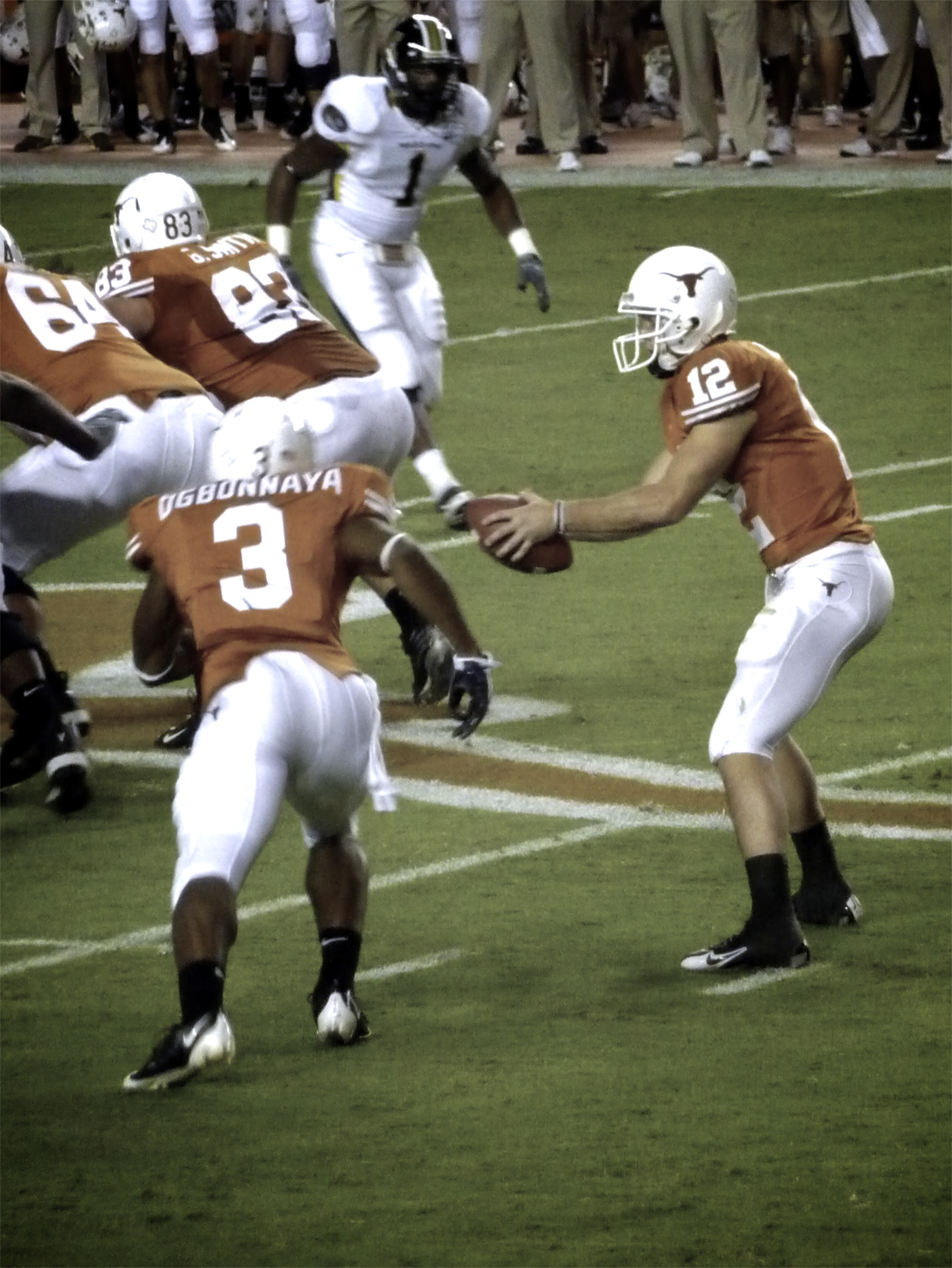
Colt McCoy runs the zone read with Chris Ogbonnaya against Missouri.

Missouri won the coin toss and elected to receive the kickoff. They returned the ball to their 40 yard-line. On the first play from scrimmage, Missouri tried a reverse, but Texas dropped them for a loss and Missouri went three-and-out. Missouri had gone without a three-and-out for the whole season until having two during their loss the previous week against Oklahoma State. The Missouri punt rolled to the Texas 6-yard line. Colt McCoy led the Longhorns 95-yards for a touchdown.

Texas had the ball 5-times in the first half and scored a touchdown each time, taking a 35-0 lead. Missouri scored a field goal at the end of the first half to make the score 35-3. Texas was forced to punt on their first possession of the second half and Missouri scored a touchdown to narrow the lead to 35-10. Texas rebounded with a touchdown and Missouri was never able to cut the lead to less than 25 points. The final score was Texas-56, Missouri-31.

McCoy completed the game with 337 yards on 29-of-32 passing with two touchdowns, rushed for two more and at one point completed a school-record 17 passes in a row. His completion ratio of 79% coming into the game improved as he completed 91% of his passes in this game. His four touchdowns put him in first place for the most career touchdowns scored at Texas (82), passing Vince Young (81). McCoy's performance helped propel him into the midst of the Heisman Trophy speculation for 2008. For example, Tim Tebow, quarterback of the Florida Gators has a vote as the 2007 winner. Tebow said after Missouri game that McCoy would have his vote at this point in the season.

ESPN's recap of the game said, "And when McCoy dribbled the ball on the ground only to pick it up and throw a strike that kept the last drive of the half alive, he created the 'Did you just see that?' moment of the season so far. With one half of near-perfect football, Texas buried not only the remnants of the Sooners and the Tigers, but any doubt about who deserves to be No. 1. For now." When the initial Bowl Championship Series (BCS) rankings were released following the game, Texas was in the #1 spot.

=== Oklahoma State ===
| | 1 | 2 | 3 | 4 | Total |
|---|---|---|---|---|---|
| #8 Oklahoma State | 0 | 14 | 7 | 3 | 24 |
| #1 Texas | 7 | 14 | 7 | 0 | 28 |

Texas has played the Oklahoma State Cowboys football (OSU) program 22 times and holds a 20–2–0 record from 1916 through 2007. Texas has a ten game active winning streak against OSU, with the Cowboys most recent victory occurring in 1997. The Longhorns have needed spectacular comebacks to win some of the games. They trailed by as many as 28 points in 2004 yet rallied to win. They erased a 19 point half-time deficit in 2005, tying the school record for a second-half comeback. In the most recent meeting OSU led by 21 points entering the fourth quarter but Texas scored 24 unanswered points to secure a 38–35 victory and set a record for the largest fourth-quarter comeback in Longhorn history.

The 2008 Cowboys have a high-scoring offense and they come into the game undefeated at 7–0, including a big win over then #3 Missouri. Oklahoma State was ranked #8 in the Coaches' Poll and #7 in the AP Poll and BCS standings. Oklahoma State is averaging 46.4 points a game and running for 283 yards a game, the fifth-best rushing attack in the nation. The Houston Chronicle reported, "For a program that's never finished higher than third in the Big 12 South, the Cowboys are tied with Texas and Texas Tech for the division lead and remain in the national title discussion as one of only nine remaining unbeatens in Division I-A. The Cowboys also represent the most balanced offense Texas will face this season."

The morning of the game, Las Vegas casinos favored Texas by 12½ points. The weather forecast called for a high of 84 °F (29 °C) and partly cloudy skies. Texas won the hard fought contest 28–24.

It was the third ranked opponent defeated by Texas in as many weeks. The last time a team beat three teams ranked in the AP top 11 was Auburn in 1983. ESPN's Beano Cook said, "What Texas is doing is unbelievable. If they go undefeated, they should go straight to the Super Bowl." When he was asked to recall a more difficult run, Cook replied, "the Marines in the South Pacific."

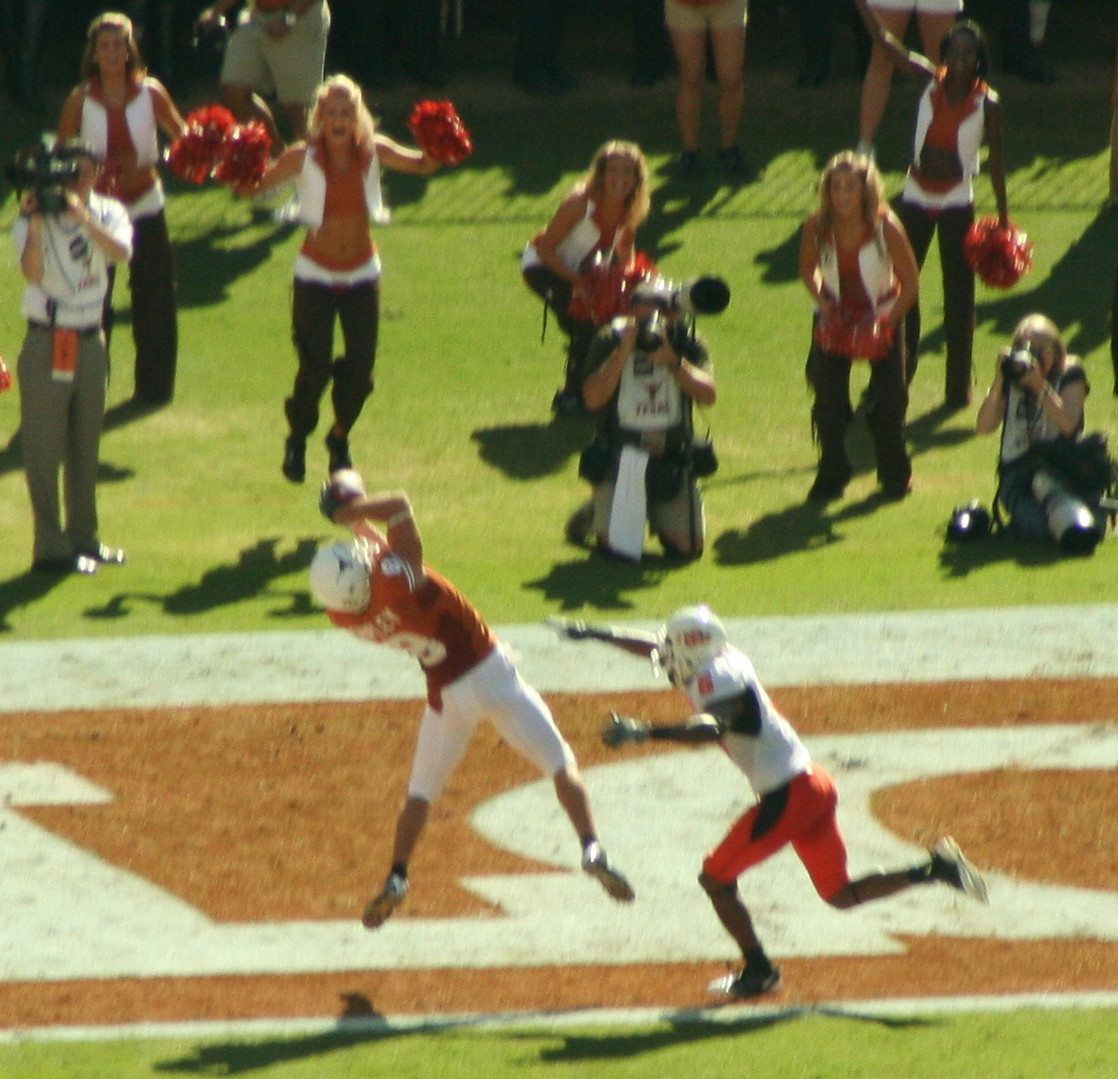
The 1st of 4 touchdowns on the day

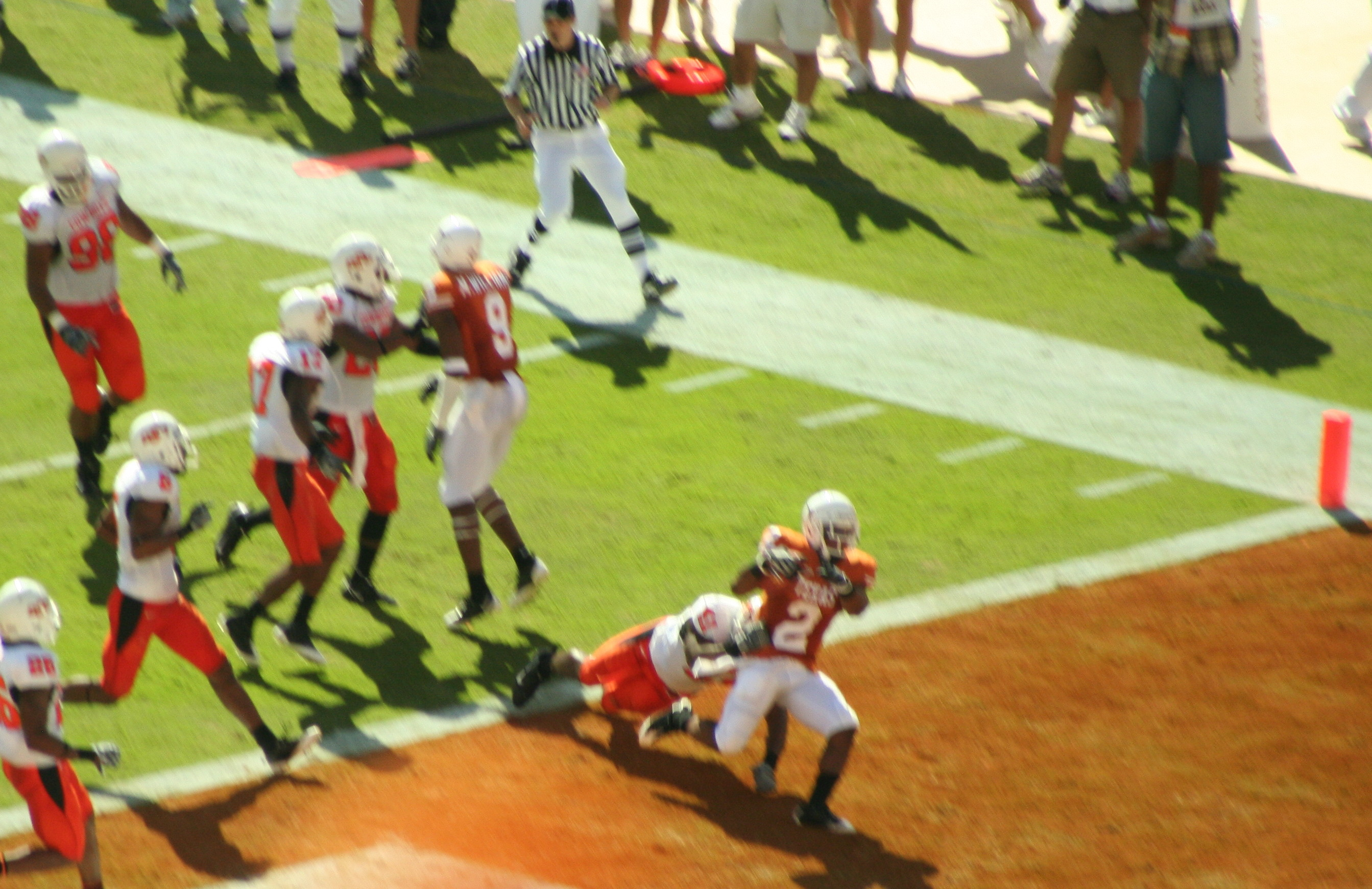
The 2nd of 4 touchdowns on the day

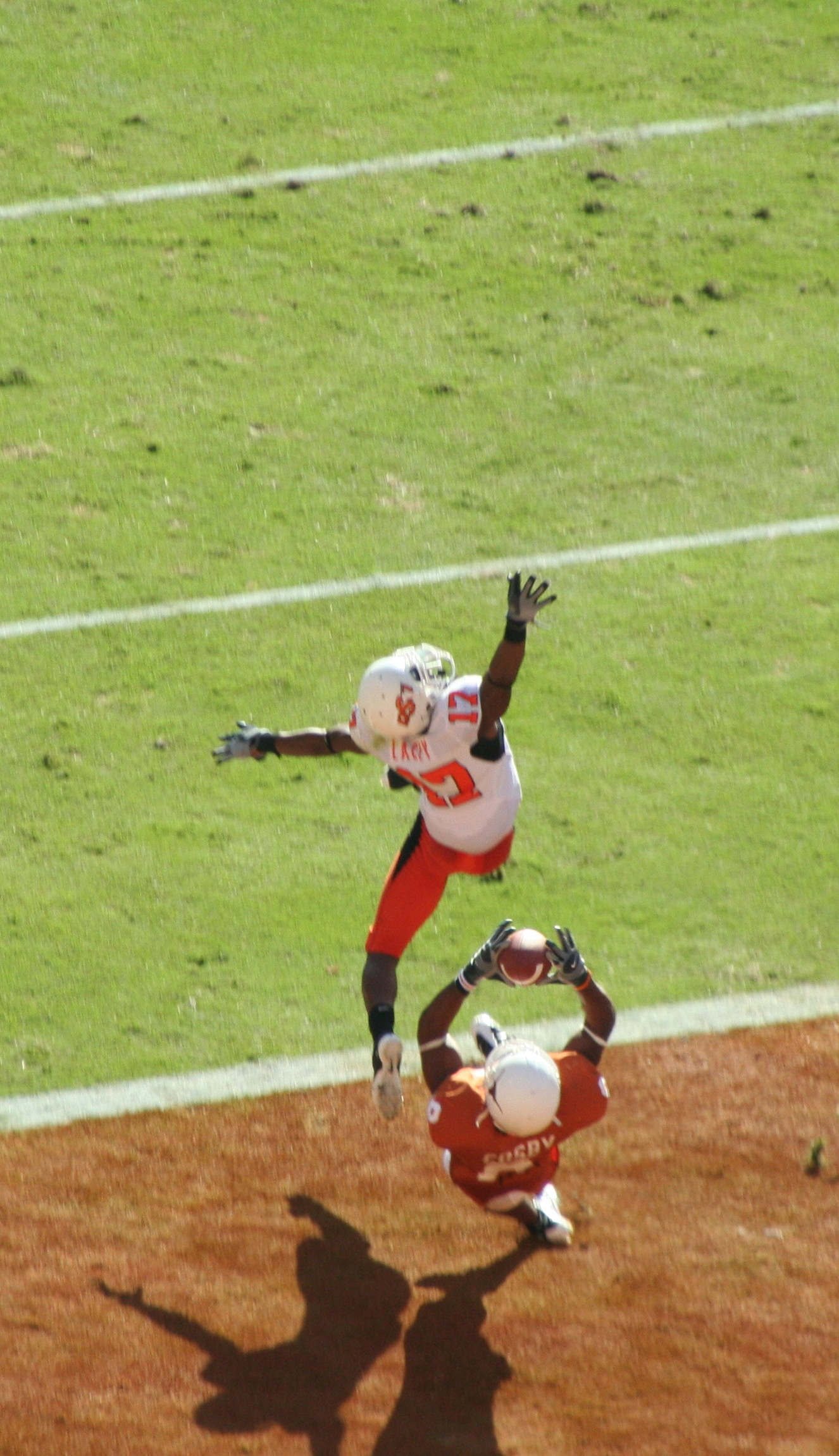
The 3rd of 4 touchdowns on the day

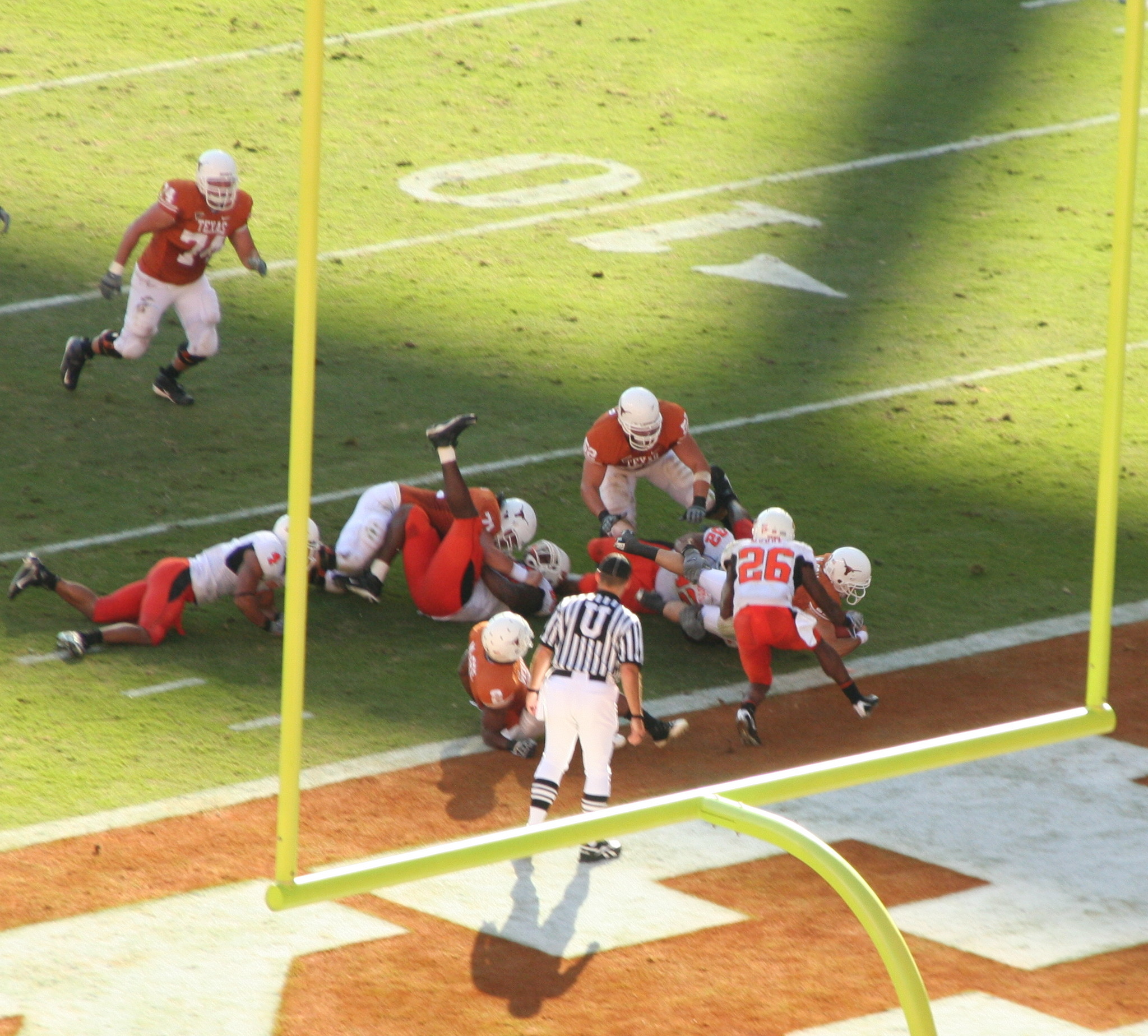
The 4th of 4 touchdowns on the day

=== Texas Tech ===
| | 1 | 2 | 3 | 4 | Total |
|---|---|---|---|---|---|
| #1 Texas | 0 | 6 | 13 | 14 | 33 |
| #5 Texas Tech | 12 | 10 | 7 | 10 | 39 |

The series with the Texas Tech Red Raiders began in 1928 and the Longhorns' record through 2007 was 43–14–0. In the 2006 contest, #5 ranked Texas barely came away with a 35–31 win over an unranked Texas Tech team. In the 2007 game #14 Texas won 59–43. During his post-game press conference, Texas Tech's Mike Leach used most of his time to rail against the officiating crew for incompetence and bias. He speculated that the officials may have favored Texas because the head official lives in Austin, because they are incompetent, or possibly because the conference wants Texas to appear in a BCS bowl because of the increased appearance fees that such a bowl generates for the conference. Jim Vertuno of the Associated Press wrote "Leach was upset officials disallowed two Tech touchdowns in the third quarter. The first was overruled when video replay clearly showed the receiver let the ball hit the ground. On the next play, a touchdown pass was negated by a holding penalty. Leach also wanted, but didn't get, a flag for roughing the quarterback." The Lubbock Avalanche-Journal reported, "Big 12 policy prohibits coaches from commenting publicly about game officials, so Leach's actions leave him open to reprimand, fine or worse." ESPN reported, "Leach's rant will likely draw a fine from the league and possibly a suspension." The Big12 fined Leach $10,000, the largest fine in conference history.

The morning of the game, Las Vegas casinos favored Texas by 3½ points. The weather forecast called for a temperature of 72 °F (22 °C) and clear skies at kick-off. Students camped for a week to secure seating, and ESPN's College GameDay broadcast from Lubbock, Texas for the first time in the program's history.

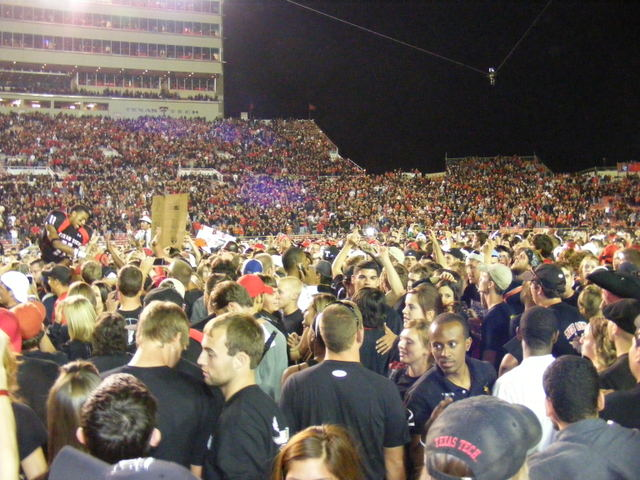
Students and fans rush the field after the #5 Red Raiders upset the #1 Longhorns

Texas Tech won the coin toss and elected to receive the ball. The Longhorns forced a stop and the ensuing punt rolled inside the Texas 2-yard line. Offensive coordinator Greg Davis opted to line up in the I formation, an unusual formation for a team having trouble establishing a strong running game. The Texas running back was stopped in the end-zone for a two-point safety. Tech led the Longhorns for most of the game, by as much as nineteen points. Texas rallied to take a one-point lead with less than 1½ minutes remaining in the game. On the Red Raiders drive, Tech running back Baron Batch let a perfect pass slip through his hands and off his helmet, sending it spiraling into the air where a Texas defensive back missed an interception that would have sealed a Texas victory, letting the ball slide through his hands. In the final minute, down 33–32 with one timeout remaining, Texas Tech Heisman Trophy candidate QB Graham Harrell engineered a drive down the field by throwing for first downs which repeatedly stopped the clock in order to move the chains, and almost threw an interception that bounced off the hands of Tech running back Baron Batch and then fell through the hands of Texas defensive back Blake Gideon that would have ended the comeback attempt. Harrell's final play was a pass to Heisman Trophy candidate wide receiver Michael Crabtree, who caught the ball near the sideline and broke away from two Longhorn defenders to scamper in for the winning score with a second left to play. The extra point gave them a 39–33 lead with one second remaining. The Tech fans had rushed the field after the touchdown, and again after the extra point. Tech was penalized accordingly and had to kick off from the 7½-yard line. Texas took the squib kick and lateraled twice in an attempt to score on the kickoff, but Tech caught one of the laterals to end the game. Subsequent to the loss, Texas fell from #1 to #4 in the BCS Poll, and Texas Tech rose to #2, behind Alabama.

=== Baylor ===
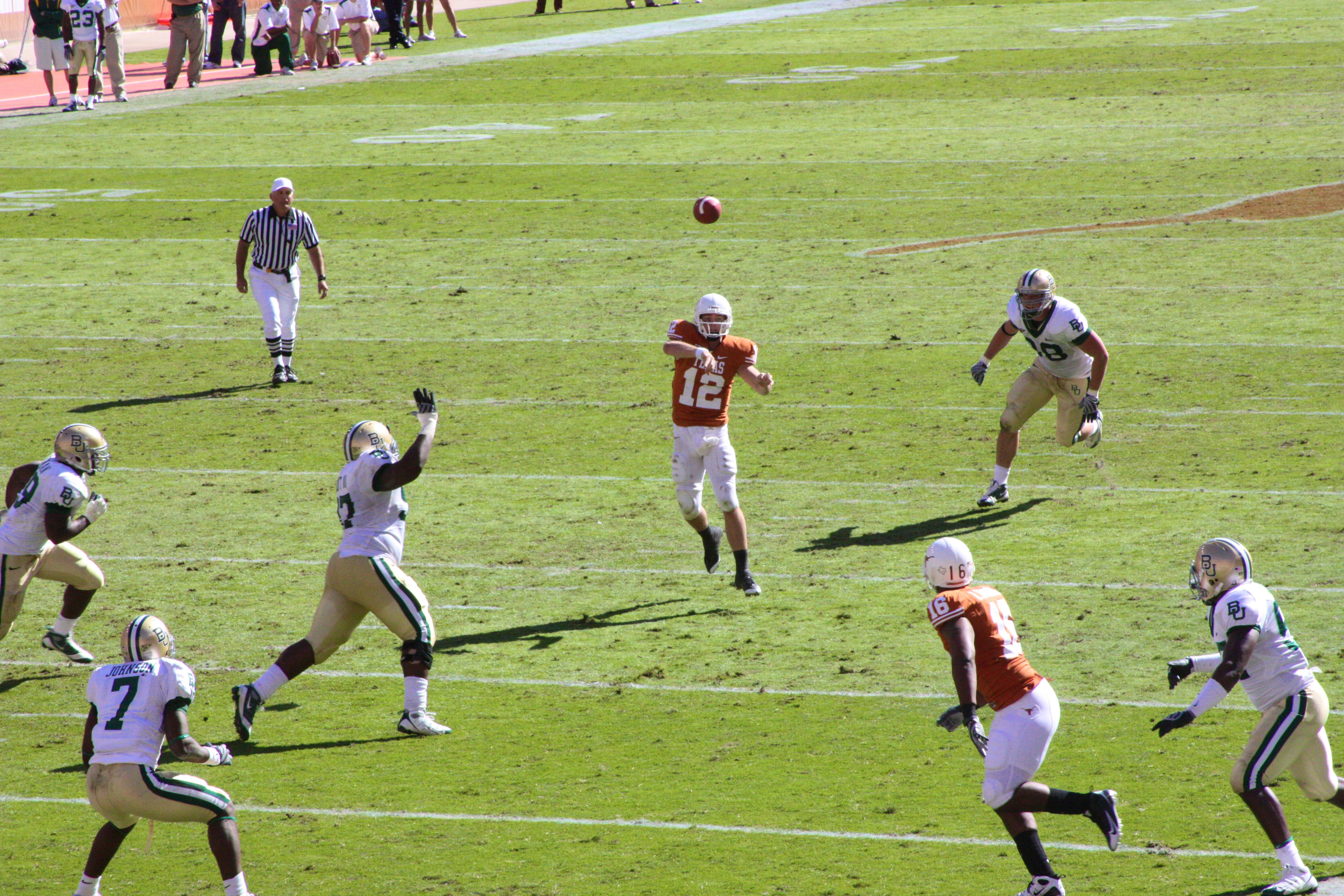
Colt McCoy throws a pass against Baylor.

| | 1 | 2 | 3 | 4 | Total |
|---|---|---|---|---|---|
| Baylor | 0 | 14 | 0 | 7 | 21 |
| #4 Texas | 14 | 14 | 14 | 3 | 45 |

The Longhorns first played the Baylor Bears in 1901 and faced them annually during the days of the Southwest Conference. In the 97 meetings through 2007, Texas' record with the Bears was 71 wins, 22 losses, and 4 ties. This is Texas' third-longest rivalry by number of games: only Oklahoma and Texas A&M have faced Texas more often on the football field. Texas won the 2006 game 63–31. The 2007 game was initially a close fought contest, but Texas outlasted the Bears for a 31–10 victory.

The morning of the game, sports books favored Texas by 27 points. The temperature was 69 °F (21 °C) at kickoff and the skies were sunny for the game.

Texas got off to a fast start with two touchdowns in the first quarter, but Baylor tied the score at 14–14. Texas then scored 31 straight points before yielding a late field goal to Baylor. The final score was 45–21. McCoy passed for 300 yards and five touchdowns. The Associated Press story commented, "And McCoy likely refueled his Heisman Trophy bid by completing 26 of 37 passes for his fourth 300-yard game this season, and eighth of his career, even without playing the final 12 minutes. The touchdowns went to four different receivers, though he did have two interceptions."

Texas had lost a close road game the prior week to Texas Tech, who were undefeated at 8-0 and ranked #5 in the Coaches' Poll. As a result, the Longhorns fell to #7 in the Coach's poll and #4 in the BCS Standings, keeping alive the possibility they could still play for the national championship if other top teams stumble. The same day Texas defeated Baylor, #3 Penn State lost their game and Texas subsequently moved up to #3 in the BCS rankings. The win over Baylor was the 829th win for the UT football program, which tied Notre Dame for 2nd in the list of college football's ten most victorious programs. Notre Dame lost later the same day, so the tie will last until at least November 15.

On November 11 (with UT holding an 8-1 record) Heisman voter Rodney Gilmore of ESPN.com had Colt McCoy listed third of five Heisman candidates. Gilmore said, "I love his numbers (78 percent completion percentage, 28 TDs, only 7 picks and 2,879 yards) and his gutsy second-half performance against Texas Tech. And I have not forgotten about his epic performance against Oklahoma just a few weeks ago. However, Harrell outplayed McCoy head-to-head in the showdown last week, so Harrell has a leg up on him for now, but McCoy is within striking distance."

=== Kansas ===
| | 1 | 2 | 3 | 4 | Total |
|---|---|---|---|---|---|
| #5 Texas | 7 | 7 | 21 | 0 | 35 |
| Kansas | 0 | 0 | 7 | 0 | 7 |

Coming into 2008, Texas held a 6–0 record against Kansas since the formation of the Big12. In order to win the 2004 game against the Kansas Jayhawks, Texas had to convert a 4th-and-18 situation and complete a touchdown pass with only eleven seconds remaining on the clock. The 2005 game provided much less on-field drama, as Texas led 52–0 by halftime and defeated Kansas 66–14. The two teams did not face each other in 2006 or 2007.

The morning of the 2008 game, Las Vegas casinos favored Texas by 14 points. The weather at kickoff was 37 °F (3 °C) and partly cloudy, with winds of 23–30 miles per hour. Snow flurries began near the end of the first half.

Texas won the 2008 game, 35–7; Notre Dame won vs. Navy the same day, leaving the Longhorns and the Fighting Irish tied for second place in all-time wins. It was Colt McCoy's 30th career win, which tied him with Vince Young for the school record. McCoy completed 24 of 35 passing attempts (71%) for 255 yards and 2 touchdown passes. He was also the leading rusher for both schools, rushing for 78 yards and a touchdown. Kansas quarterback Todd Reesing, an Austin native, completed 25 of 50 passes for 258 yards and 1 touchdown. McCoy's two touchdown passes put him at 31 for the season, breaking his own school record.

The Longhorns also ensured their eight consecutive season with ten or more wins per season. That is the longest active streak in the nation and it ties them with Miami (1985–92) for the second-longest streak of all-time.

=== Texas A&M ===
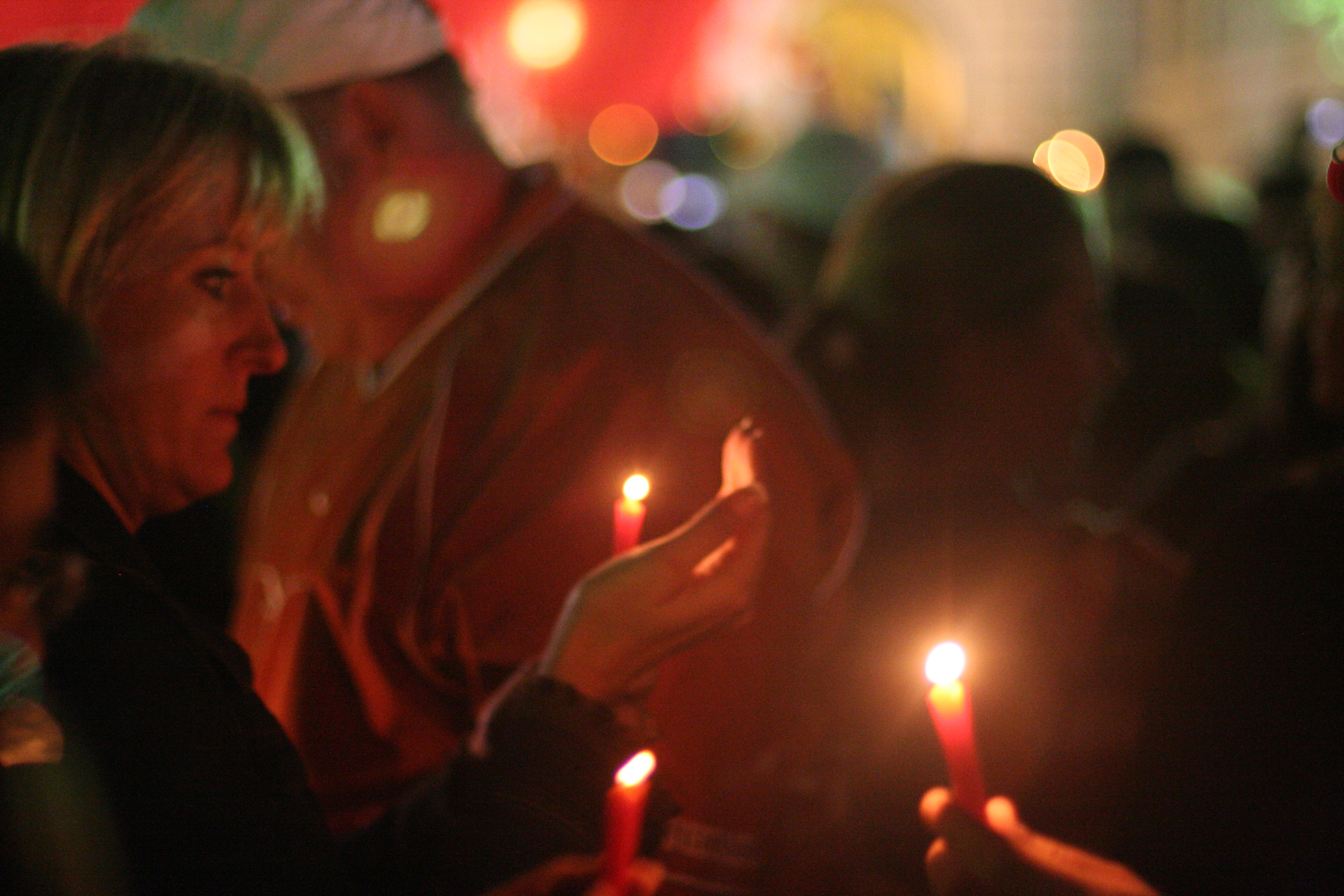
Fans light red candles at the 2008 Texas Hex rally.

| | 1 | 2 | 3 | 4 | Total |
|---|---|---|---|---|---|
| Texas A&M | 0 | 3 | 0 | 6 | 9 |
| #4 Texas | 7 | 14 | 7 | 21 | 49 |

This game marks the 115th meeting between Texas and the Texas A&M Aggies and it will be the fifth year as part of a multi-sport rivalry called the Lone Star Showdown. The football rivalry began in 1894 and it is the longest-running rivalry for both the Longhorns and the Aggies and it is also the third most-played rivalry in Division I-A college football. Since the series began in 1900, the game has traditionally been played on Thanksgiving Day or Thanksgiving weekend. The 2007 game marked the twelfth straight game to be scheduled the day after Thanksgiving. The two schools have agreed to move the game back to Thanksgiving Day for the 2008 and 2009 contests.

Although Texas entered the 2008 contest with a record of 73–36–5, the Longhorns had lost the last two games to the Aggies. The 2006 meeting was the first time in eight years that both teams entered the game with at least eight wins coming into the match-up. That game came one week after Texas lost to Kansas State and the Longhorns suffered a 7–12 loss to the Aggies. Going back to 1999 when Texas lost the final three games of the season, the Longhorns had gone 87 games without losing back-to-back games. That was the longest active streak for any college or professional football team.

2007 was a turbulent year for the Aggies. A&M head coach Dennis Franchione spent much of the season being criticized for his coaching performance. Criticism intensified in late September as it became known that Franchione had been selling a secret email newsletter to athletic boosters who paid US$1,200 annually for team information that Franchione has refused to release to the public. The newsletter, called "VIP Connection", had been written by Franchione's personal assistant, Mike McKenzie, and included specific injury reports and Franchione's critical assessments of players. A bright spot was their defeat of the Longhorns, 38–30. At the beginning of the post-game press conference, Franchione announced his resignation effective immediately. Mike Sherman was hired three days later, becoming the 28th head coach of the Texas A&M football program.

As a result of a 1999 accident that killed 12 students and injured 27 others, the Aggies can no longer hold a school sponsored version of their traditional Bonfire but an unofficial "Student Bonfire" will burn on November 22, 2008. The Longhorns will hold their traditional Hex Rally November 24, 2008. The Aggies came into the 2008 game with a 4–7 record, assuring that they would have a losing season no matter the outcome of the game with UT.

The weather forecast called for a game-time temperature of 70 °F (21 °C) and a 40% chance of rain. Odds makers in Las Vegas predicted Texas would win by 35 points. The biggest margin of victory in the history of the rivalry occurred when Texas beat A&M 48–0 in 1898. Texas nearly equaled that record this year by producing a 49–9 victory, the second-largest margin of victory for this rivalry series.

The win was the 31st for Colt McCoy, setting a new school record. It was also the 200th career win for Mack Brown, and it set a new attendance record for UT, the State of Texas, the Big 12 Conference, and the southwest region. Texas entered the season trailing Michigan and Notre Dame in the list of all-time victories. With the win, Texas finished its regular season 11–1, bringing its all-time win total to 831. Notre Dame compiled a 6–6 regular season record, increasing its win total to 830. Thus, Texas passed Notre Dame and now holds the #2 spot as of the completion of the 2008 regular season.

McCoy threw ran for 2 touchdowns and threw for 2 more. He completed 23 of 28 attempted passes for a total of 311 yards. That yardage put him at 3,594 yards for the season - another school record. His longest pass of the evening, 68 yarder on a post route to Jordan Shipley late in the third quarter, ended up a yard short of being McCoy's fifth touchdown of the evening.

Oklahoma and Texas Tech also won their final regular-season games, which left in place a three-way tie for first place in the Big 12 south. The tie was broken in favor of the Oklahoma Sooners using a controversial ranking formula (see below). Thus, Oklahoma advanced to play in the 2008 Big 12 Championship Game and Texas waited for the results of that game to determine which bowl game would select Texas.

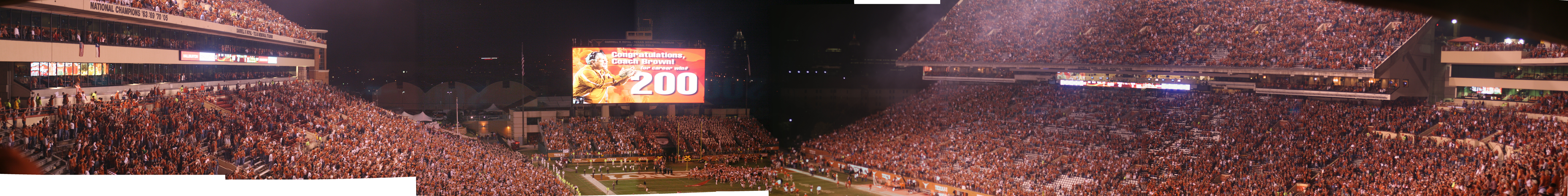
Godzillatron announces Mack Brown's 200th career win before the largest crowd for a Texas or Big 12 football game.

=== 2009 Fiesta Bowl - Ohio State ===
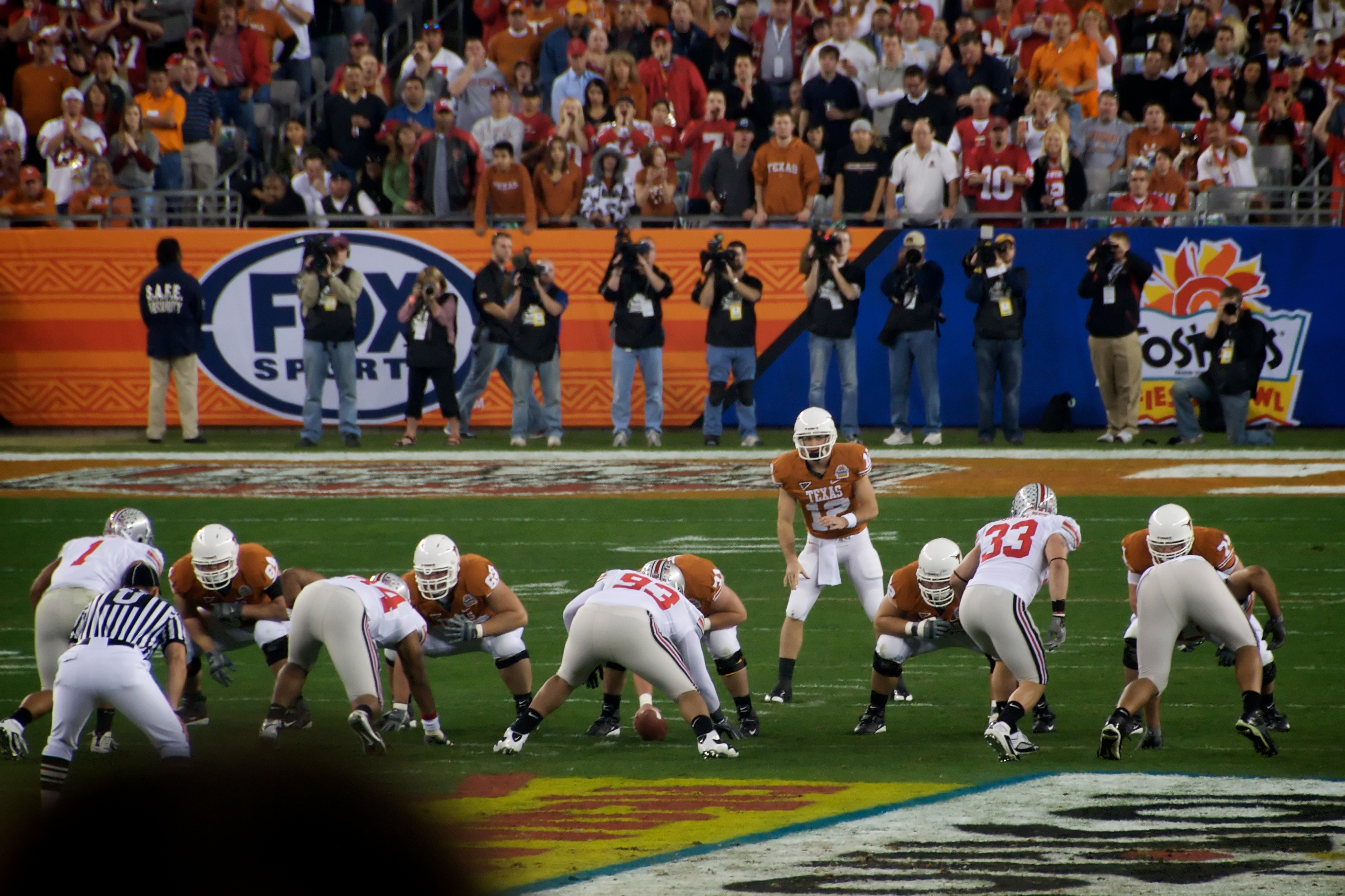
2009 Fiesta Bowl

| | 1 | 2 | 3 | 4 | Total |
|---|---|---|---|---|---|
| #10 Ohio State | 3 | 3 | 0 | 15 | 21 |
| #3 Texas | 0 | 3 | 14 | 7 | 24 |

After being passed over in the selection for the 2009 BCS National Championship Game (see below), Texas accepted an invitation to play the Ohio State Buckeyes (OSU). The day the bowl bids were announced the sports betting line opened with Texas as ten-point favorites, the most of any of the 2009 BCS bowls. Texas and Ohio State have two of the longest-running programs in college football, but they have played each other only twice. Texas won the 2005 game en route to winning their most recent national championship. In the 2006 game, which was won by Ohio State, OSU and Texas were ranked #1 and #2 respectively. It was only the 36th time that the top two teams in college football had ever faced each other.

With under a minute to play, Texas Quarterback Colt McCoy engineered a comeback, and capped off the drive with a pass to WR Quan Cosby. Cosby eluded 2 defenders and ran almost 35 yards to score a touchdown. On the ensuing Ohio State drive which started with about 40 seconds on the clock, the Texas defense stepped up, and denied Ohio State from scoring. With a couple of seconds on the clock, Ohio State tried a hail mary, in vain.

== Rankings and championship possibilities ==
Ranking movements Legend: ██ Increase in ranking ██ Decrease in ranking
| | Week | | | | | | | | | | | | | | | | |
| Poll | Pre | 1 | 2 | 3 | 4 | 5 | 6 | 7 | 8 | 9 | 10 | 11 | 12 | 13 | 14 | 15 | Final |
|---|---|---|---|---|---|---|---|---|---|---|---|---|---|---|---|---|---|
| AP | 11 | 10 | 8 | 7 | 7 | 5 | 5 | 1 | 1 | 1 | 5 | 4 | 4 | 4 | 3 | 3 | 4 |
| Coaches | 10 | 9 | 8 | 7 | 7 | 5 | 5 | 1 | 1 | 1 | 7 | 5 | 4 | 4 | 3 | 3 | 3 |
| Harris | Not released | | | | | 5 | 5 | 1 | 1 | 1 | 6 | 4 | 4 | 4 | 4 | 3 | Not released |
| BCS | Not released | | | | | | | | 1 | 1 | 4 | 3 | 3 | 2 | 3 | 3 | Not released |

In order to have played in the 2009 BCS National Championship Game at the end of the 2008 season, Texas would have needed to have been ranked #1 or #2 in the final BCS rankings of the season. Texas rose to first place in the BCS rankings following their win over Missouri. They held that position for two weeks before losing to Texas Tech and dropping to fourth. The loss to Texas Tech on November 1 left the Longhorns dependent on the play of other teams to determine UT's fate for the season. Texas won the rest of their games, but so did Oklahoma. Texas Tech's only regular season loss was to Oklahoma. Because the three teams finished in a three-way tie, the final BCS poll of the season served as the tie-breaker.

In the November 9 BCS rankings the Longhorns rose to third place due to a loss by Penn State, who had been in third place. Alabama was in the top position, Texas Tech was second, Florida fourth, and Oklahoma fifth. The following weekend, Alabama, Texas, and Florida won while Texas Tech and Oklahoma did not play. The top five rankings remained unchanged except that Texas switched places with Oklahoma in the Coaches' Poll, moving up to fourth place.

When Texas only had its final game of the regular season, against Texas A&M, Texas Tech had two games remaining: against Oklahoma and Baylor. Besides Tech, Oklahoma still had a game pending against Oklahoma State. Alabama still faced Auburn and then the 2008 SEC Championship Game against Florida. Florida faced The Citadel prior to meeting Alabama in the SEC Championship Game. That left a variety of scenarios possible for Texas' championship hopes, provided they won against A&M.

Even if it didn't win the Big 12 South Division, Texas still had a reasonable chance at that point of playing for the national championship. In the 2001 season and the 2003 season, the national championship game included a Big 12 team that had not won the conference championship. In 2001, Nebraska did not play in the Big 12 Championship but went on to play for the national title. In 2003, the Sooners entered Big 12 Conference Championship ranked number one in the BCS rankings, but lost to Kansas State. They only fell to second place and went on to the BCS championship.

=== 45–35 campaign and BCS controversy ===
On November 22 Oklahoma beat Texas Tech 65–21 in Norman, Oklahoma. The win dropped Texas Tech to #7 in the BCS and moved Texas and Oklahoma to #2 and #3, respectively. It also forced a three-way tie in the Big 12 South division between Texas, Texas Tech, and Oklahoma. Oklahoma, Texas, and Texas Tech each had one remaining regular season game. Texas played Texas A&M on Thanksgiving (November 27) and won 49–9. Texas Tech played Baylor on November 29 and won 35–28. Oklahoma played Oklahoma State on the same day and won 61–41. According to Big 12 Conference tie-breaker rules, when three teams finish tied, the highest in the BCS on December 1 goes to the Big 12 Championship Game. If Texas had finished #1 or #2 in the BCS, they would have gone to the National Championship Game even without going to the Big 12 Championship Game. BCS rules exist primarily to match up #1 vs. #2, and the rules prohibit three teams from the same conference making BCS berths.

==== Polls prior to final regular season games ====
According to the average rankings by Jeff Sagarin, Texas was the top team in the country followed by Oklahoma. Sagarin's ELO_CHESS ranking is a portion of the BCS computer rankings and it does not consider margin of victory. UT scored 93.56% vs 92.32% for Oklahoma. Sagarin's PREDICTOR score does include margin of victory in its calculation, but it is not part of the BCS formula. In this score, Texas still ranked higher than OU (95.28% vs 94.79%) and Texas Tech (89.35%) but the top three teams were USC (99.94%), Florida (99.58%), and Penn State (95.34%).

Texas combined BCS point average was 92.09% and Oklahoma's was 91.25%, for a separation of .84%. The human voters in the Coaches' Poll and Harris Interactive Poll, which each constitute 1/3 of the BCS formula, had moved Oklahoma ahead of Texas. Before the final game, Texas had a substantial lead over OU in the computer rankings (96% to 90%). However, in the final week, OU faced OSU, which was ranked 12th in the BCS, while Texas played an unranked Texas A&M. With both teams winning, the Sooners edged past the Longhorns.

==== 45–35 campaign ====
Longhorn fans created a 45–35 campaign to remind voters in the AP and Coaches' polls that Texas beat OU 45-35 on a neutral field. Sophomore Austin Talbert created a Facebook group titled Texas did beat OU 45–35, lest we forget. and senior Matt Parks created a website titled Better Consider the Scoreboard. The campaign raised over $7,500 to have 20,000 45-35 signs printed for the Texas A&M at Texas game and to have a plane bearing the message Texas 45 OU 35 — settled on a neutral field fly over ESPN GameDay prior to the Oklahoma at Oklahoma State game. Excess proceeds were donated to the UT Orange Santa program and the Jimmy V Foundation for Cancer research. The Daily Texan printed an additional 5,000 to 30,000 signs.

John Bianco, UT's assistant athletic director for media relations, said that the campaign was done "independently" of the university.

The campaign was covered by the Austin American-Statesman, CBS, the Dallas Morning News, the Denver Post, ESPN, the Fort Worth Star-Telegram, the Houston Chronicle, the Kansas City Star, KEYE-TV, The New York Times, The Oklahoman, and the San Antonio Express-News.

==== Texas Tech and Oklahoma fan response ====
In response to the 45–35 campaign, Texas Tech and Oklahoma fans created a 39–33 campaign to remind voters that Texas Tech beat Texas 39–33 in Lubbock. An anonymous individual also created a website titled The game that Texas Longhorn fans seem to have forgotten. Tech Alumnus Shane Walker and other Red Raider fans also raised money to have their own plane fly over ESPN GameDay at the OU at Oklahoma State game, with a banner carrying the website "www.39-33.com".

That campaign was covered by the Fort Worth Star-Telegram and the Oklahoman.

==== Results ====
In the Coaches' Poll, Oklahoma lost 15 votes, but remained at #2 with 1,397 votes while Texas gained 26 votes to move up to #3 with 1,396 votes. In the Harris poll, Texas gained two votes to pass OU and move up to #3 while OU lost 29 votes to fall to #4. In the AP poll, Texas gained six votes to pass OU and move up to #3 while OU lost six votes to fall to the #4 position. In the Sagarin ratings, one of the six computer polls that makes up one third of the BCS rankings, one loss Oklahoma moved into the #1 spot, jumping undefeated Alabama. Texas moved up to the #2 spot.

Oklahoma and Missouri both went to the Big 12 Championship Game, so the game featured two teams that Texas beat by double digits. Oklahoma beat Missouri 62–21 and finished ranked #1 in the final BCS standings. Oklahoma would then go on to lose the BCS Championship to Florida, 24-14. Texas Tech also lost their bowl game to Mississippi in the Cotton Bowl. Texas would win the BCS Fiesta Bowl over Ohio State, 24-21.

== Players drafted into the NFL ==
| Round | Pick | Player | Position | NFL Club |
|---|---|---|---|---|
| 1 | 13 | Brian Orakpo | OLB | Washington Redskins |
| 3 | 81 | Roy Miller | DT | Tampa Bay Buccaneers |
| 4 | 105 | Henry Melton | DE | Chicago Bears |
| 7 | 211 | Chris Ogbonnaya | RB | St. Louis Rams |
