= Mike Johnson (linebacker) =

American football player (born 1962)

No. 59
- Position: Linebacker

Personal information
- Born: November 26, 1962 (age 63); Southport, North Carolina, U.S.
- Listed height: 6 ft 1 in (1.85 m)
- Listed weight: 230 lb (104 kg)

Career information
- High school: DeMatha Catholic (Hyattsville, Maryland)
- College: Virginia Tech
- Supplemental draft: 1984: 1st round, 18th overall pick

Career history
- Philadelphia/Baltimore Stars (1984–1985); Cleveland Browns (1986–1993); Detroit Lions (1994–1995)

Awards and highlights
- All-Pro (1989); 2× Pro Bowl (1989, 1990); First-team All-South Independent (1982, 1983)

Career NFL statistics
- Sacks: 14.5
- Interceptions: 13
- Touchdowns: 2
- Stats at Pro Football Reference

Michael Connan Johnson (born November 26, 1962) is an American former professional football player who was a linebacker for ten seasons in the National Football League (NFL), primarily with the Cleveland Browns. He played college football for the Virginia Tech Hokies. Johnson began his pro career in the United States Football League (USFL) for the Philadelphia/Baltimore Stars for two seasons.

== Early life ==
Johnson attended DeMatha Catholic High School. He was recruited by coach Billy Hite to play football at Virginia Tech. He was an architecture major during his tenure during college. He was an Academic All-American in 1982.

His career was largely overshadowed by that of Bruce Smith during his college career. The Hokies went 31-14 during his career, but due to the time period in which they played, had to settle for only one bowl game.

Despite never playing in the ACC, he was chosen to the 2011 ACC Legends team. His accomplishments at Tech earned him a spot in the Virginia Tech Sports Hall of Fame.

== Professional career ==
Johnson was selected by the Pittsburgh Maulers in the 1984 USFL Territorial Draft. He also was selected by the Cleveland Browns in the 1st round (18th overall) of the 1984 NFL Supplemental Draft of USFL and CFL Players.

He was traded to the Philadelphia Stars, where he played the 1984 USFL season. The team moved to Baltimore for the 1985 USFL season.

In 1986, he joined the NFL after the USFL folded. He played his first three years in the NFL in a 3-4 defense. It wasn't until 1989 that the Browns then switched up to the more traditional 4-3 defense, at which Johnson started at middle linebacker until 1993.

He made two trips to the Pro Bowl in 1989 and 1990, the latter in which he was an injury replacement. He was voted to the All-Pro team after the 1989 season. Mike has been voted by The Plain Dealer to the top 100 Browns of all-time at No. 69.

== Personal life ==
Johnson played high school football at DeMatha High school in Hyattsville, Maryland. He graduated in the top 15% of his high school class. Johnson is the brother-in-law of former Dallas Cowboys guard Nate Newton, and uncle of Texas Longhorns running back Tre' Newton.
