= Tre' Newton =

American football player (born 1989)

No. 23
- Position: Running back

Personal information
- Born: October 15, 1989 (age 37); Dallas, Texas, U.S.
- Listed height: 6 ft 0 in (1.83 m)
- Listed weight: 200 lb (91 kg)

Career information
- High school: Southlake Carroll (Southlake, Texas)
- College: University of Texas (2008–2012)

Awards and highlights
- 2007 Second-team All-State (AP)
- Stats at ESPN

Nathaniel "Tre'" Newton III (born October 15, 1989) is an American former college football running back. He graduated from the University of Texas at Austin and is a former starting running back for the Texas Longhorns.

== Early life ==
Newton attended Carroll High School in Southlake, Texas, where he was a four-year starter under coaches Todd Dodge and Hal Wasson. Newton helped lead the Dragons to a 59–2 record and three 5A state titles by rushing for 4,728 yards and 49 touchdowns on 610 carries (7.8 average). He also caught 56 passes for 784 yards (14.0 avg) and six touchdowns. Newton was a three-time all-state selection. In his four years at Southlake Carroll, Newton lined up next to three different quarterbacks, all of whom went on to play FBS college football: Chase Daniel, Greg McElroy, and Riley Dodge.

Considered a three-star recruit by Rivals.com, Newton was listed as the No. 18 running back prospect in the nation in the class of 2008. He chose Texas over offers from Kansas and Nebraska.

== College career ==
After redshirting his initial year at Texas, Newton became a key reserve in 2009 and appeared in 13 games. By the week 10 game versus Texas A&M, he had won the starting job at running back over Cody Johnson. For the season, Newton finished with 552 yards rushing on 116 carries and six touchdowns.

Newton's football career ended in 2010 after a series of head injuries that culminated with a concussion against the Kansas State Wildcats on November 6, 2010.

== Personal life ==
Tre' Newton is the son of former Dallas Cowboys offensive lineman Nate Newton, and nephew of former Minnesota Vikings defensive tackle Tim Newton. His mother, Dorothy Newton (née Johnson), played volleyball at Louisiana-Lafayette, and his uncle Mike Johnson played linebacker for the Cleveland Browns and Detroit Lions. Tre' currently works as a networking specialist at Dell Technologies in Round Rock, TX. Tre' married his college sweetheart Jacklyn Barrera on June 30, 2018.
