= 2008 Kansas State Wildcats football team =

American college football season

2008 Kansas State Wildcats football
- Conference: Big 12 Conference
- North
- Record: 5–7 (2–6 Big 12)
- Head coach: Ron Prince (3rd season)
- Offensive coordinator: Dave Brock (1st season)
- Offensive scheme: Single set back
- Defensive coordinator: Tim Tibesar (2nd season)
- Base defense: 3–4
- Home stadium: Bill Snyder Family Football Stadium

Uniform

2008 Big 12 Conference football standings
| | Conf. | | | Overall |
| Team | W | | L | W | | L |
|---|---|---|---|---|---|---|
North Division
| No. 19 Missouri xy | 5 | – | 3 | 10 | – | 4 |
| Nebraska x | 5 | – | 3 | 9 | – | 4 |
| Kansas | 4 | – | 4 | 8 | – | 5 |
| Colorado | 2 | – | 6 | 5 | – | 7 |
| Kansas State | 2 | – | 6 | 5 | – | 7 |
| Iowa State | 0 | – | 8 | 2 | – | 10 |
South Division
| No. 5 Oklahoma xy$ | 7 | – | 1 | 12 | – | 2 |
| No. 4 Texas x% | 7 | – | 1 | 12 | – | 1 |
| No. 12 Texas Tech x | 7 | – | 1 | 11 | – | 2 |
| No. 16 Oklahoma State | 5 | – | 3 | 9 | – | 4 |
| Baylor | 2 | – | 6 | 4 | – | 8 |
| Texas A&M | 2 | – | 6 | 4 | – | 8 |
Championship: Oklahoma 62, Missouri 21
$ – BCS representative as conference champion; % – BCS at-large representative; x – Division champion/co-champions; y – Championship game participant; Rankings from AP Poll

The 2008 Kansas State Wildcats football team (variously "K-State" or "KSU") represented Kansas State University in the 2008 NCAA Division I FBS football season. The Wildcats played their home games in Bill Snyder Family Stadium. The head coach was Ron Prince, who was in his third and final season at the helm of the Wildcats. The 2008 signing class was one that saw 26 signees, including 19 junior college transfers.

The schedule kicked off with four non-conference games, including a first ever trip to Louisville, Kentucky to face the Louisville Cardinals. After the non-conference schedule, K-State headed into Big 12 Conference play with Texas Tech, and ended the season with Iowa State.

== Schedule ==
| Date | Time | Opponent | Site | TV | Result | Attendance | Source |
|---|---|---|---|---|---|---|---|
| August 30 | 6:05 p.m. | North Texas* | Bill Snyder Family Football Stadium; Manhattan, KS | | W 45–6 | 45,150 | |
| September 6 | 6:05 p.m. | Montana State* | Bill Snyder Family Football Stadium; Manhattan, KS | FCS | W 69–10 | 45,241 | |
| September 17 | 7:00 p.m. | at Louisville* | Papa John's Cardinal Stadium; Louisville, KY | ESPN2 | L 29–38 | 42,208 | |
| September 27 | 2:35 p.m. | Louisiana–Lafayette* | Bill Snyder Family Football Stadium; Manhattan, KS | | W 45–37 | 45,558 | |
| October 4 | 2:30 p.m. | No. 7 Texas Tech | Bill Snyder Family Football Stadium; Manhattan, KS | ABC | L 28–58 | 43,614 | |
| October 11 | 1:05 p.m. | at Texas A&M | Kyle Field; College Station, TX | | W 44–30 | 78,669 | |
| October 18 | 6:00 p.m. | at Colorado | Folsom Field; Boulder, CO (rivalry) | FSN | L 13–14 | 52,099 | |
| October 25 | 11:30 a.m. | No. 4 Oklahoma^{†} | Bill Snyder Family Football Stadium; Manhattan, KS | FSN | L 35–58 | 47,054 | |
| November 1 | 11:30 a.m. | at Kansas | Memorial Stadium; Lawrence, KS (rivalry) | FSN | L 21–52 | 52,230 | |
| November 8 | 6:00 p.m. | at No. 13 Missouri | Faurot Field; Columbia, MO | FSN | L 24–41 | 68,349 | |
| November 15 | 2:35 p.m. | Nebraska | Bill Snyder Family Football Stadium; Manhattan, KS (rivalry) | | L 28–56 | 48,444 | |
| November 22 | 2:30 p.m. | Iowa State | Bill Snyder Family Football Stadium; Manhattan, KS (rivalry) | FCS | W 38–30 | 41,266 | |
*Non-conference game; ^{†}Homecoming; Rankings from AP Poll released prior to the game; All times are in Central time

== Game summaries ==
=== North Texas ===
| | 1 | 2 | 3 | 4 | Total |
|---|---|---|---|---|---|
| North Texas | 0 | 0 | 6 | 0 | 6 |
| Kansas State | 14 | 14 | 14 | 3 | 45 |

Josh Freeman was dominant throwing 3 touchdown passes and running for two more scores in an impressive with over Sun Belt Conference member UNT. K-State scored on 6 of their first 7 possessions and held the Mean Green to 205 total yards. Kansas State was favored by 24½ going into the game.

=== Montana State ===
| | 1 | 2 | 3 | 4 | Total |
|---|---|---|---|---|---|
| Montana State | 7 | 0 | 0 | 3 | 10 |
| Kansas State | 31 | 14 | 10 | 14 | 69 |

Kansas State quarterback Josh Freeman ran for two scores and threw for two more and K-State returned two blocked punts for touchdowns for the first time in school history in a 69-10 rout of Montana State. Kansas State also scored on a fumble recovery while ringing up their most points since a school-record 76-0 pounding of Ball State in 2000. Freeman hit 16 of 21 passes for 288 yards, including two 36-yard touchdown strikes, before being lifted midway through the third quarter in favor of back-up Carson Coffman. While rolling up 481 total yards, the Wildcats averaged 7.3 yards per play.

=== Louisville ===
| | 1 | 2 | 3 | 4 | Total |
|---|---|---|---|---|---|
| Louisville | 0 | 14 | 14 | 10 | 38 |
| Kansas State | 7 | 0 | 7 | 15 | 29 |

Kansas State traveled to Louisville, Kentucky for the first time in the program's history and did not fare well. Kansas State was favored by 4 going into the game.

Josh Freeman went 22-42, threw for 313 yards, 3 TD's, and two interceptions. K-State scored on a spectacular 86-yard punt return by Deon Murphy but it wasn't enough. Receiver Brandon Banks continued to shine as he caught seven balls for 153 yards and two touchdowns. The defense was clearly the issue, giving up 578 yards to the Cardinals, including 303 rushing yards. Freeman broke the Kansas State career completions record of 501 held by Lynn Dickey (1968–70).

=== Louisiana-Lafayette ===
| | 1 | 2 | 3 | 4 | Total |
|---|---|---|---|---|---|
| Louisiana-Lafayette | 3 | 7 | 20 | 7 | 37 |
| Kansas State | 7 | 21 | 14 | 3 | 45 |

Kansas State was favored by 21 points going into the game.

The Wildcats took on Louisiana-Lafayette for first time since the 2004 season. The Wildcats won that game by a score of 40-20. The last time K-State lost at home to an unranked non-conference opponent was in 2004 against Fresno State.

Josh Freeman broke K-State's career yardage record and threw three TD's to help the Wildcats beat Louisiana-Lafayette 45-37.

Freeman was 21-of-28 for 272 yards and has 6,238 career yards to eclipse Lynn Dickey for number 1 all-time on the Kansas State list. With 35 touchdown passes, he's two short of Ell Roberson’s school record.

Freeman, a 6-foot-6, 250-pound junior who has started every game since his freshman year, also ran for two TDs. He threw TDs of 12 and 3 yards to Deon Murphy in the first half and connected with Brandon Banks on a 53-yard scoring play that made it 42-23 with 1:49 left in the third.

Lamark Brown, who has been a wide receiver since coming to K-State, started at running back and had 137 yards, including a 3-yard TD that put Kansas State on top 35-17 in the third quarter.

=== Texas Tech ===
| | 1 | 2 | 3 | 4 | Total |
|---|---|---|---|---|---|
| #7 Texas Tech | 14 | 24 | 7 | 13 | 58 |
| Kansas State | 7 | 7 | 7 | 7 | 28 |

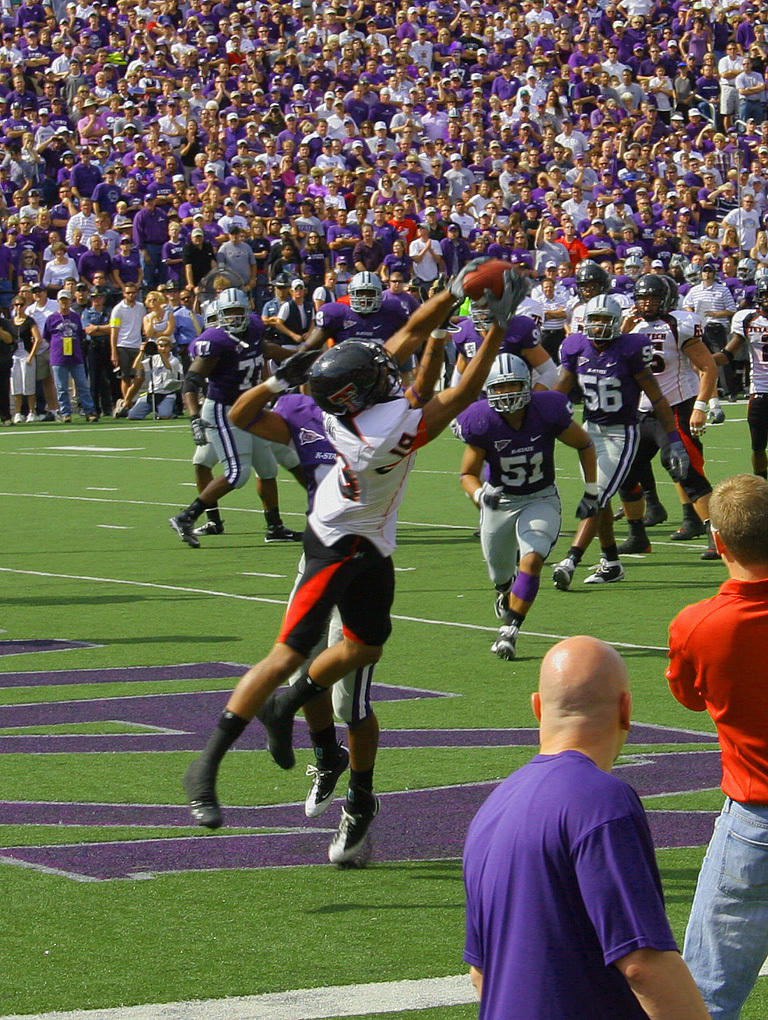
Texas Tech's Lyle Leong catching a pass for a touchdown against Kansas State

Coming into the game, K-State had lost the last 3 of 4 to the Red Raiders. Their last win against Texas Tech was in 2000 in Manhattan. Texas Tech was favored by 7.

K-State was completely outmatched in the game, with the defense giving up 626 yards. It was the third consecutive game that the Wildcats gave up more than 600 yards on defense.

Graham Harrell threw six touchdown passes and shattered the Texas Tech record for career yards passing, leading the No. 7 Red Raiders past Kansas State 58-28 in the teams' Big 12 Conference opener.

Lyle Leong snared three touchdown passes from Harrell, who was 38-for-51 for 454 yards. Texas Tech (5-0, 1-0 Big 12), with its highest ranking in 32 years, scored on seven straight possessions and did not attempt a punt until Taylor Potts replaced Harrell late in the fourth quarter.

Heisman candidate Michael Crabtree had nine catches for 107 yards and two TDs.

The Red Raiders, leading the nation in total offense (572.8 yards per game), and passing (426.2), had 417 and 316 while putting up a 38-14 halftime lead.

The six TD passes tied the career-best for Harrell, who spread his passes around to 10 different receivers. The three-year starter ran his career total to 12,709 yards, erasing the record of 12,429 yards by Kliff Kingsbury from 1999-02.

Facing fourth-and-inches from their own 29 late in the first quarter, the Red Raiders sent Shannon Woods on a sweep. But he was stuffed, and four plays later, Kansas State quarterback Josh Freeman scored on a 1-yard run, knotting the game 14-all.

A moment later, Texas Tech's Richard Jones recovered Lamark Brown’s fumble on the Kansas State 34 and Baron Batch made it 58-21 on a 9-yard run.

On successive possessions in the second quarter, Harrell led quick-hitting drives of 53, 70 and 54 yards. Freeman, in the meantime, went cold, misfiring on 9 of 10 passes, several of which Tech defenders got their hands on.

The Kansas State junior, who a week earlier had become his own school's career passing leader, was 13-for-28 for 170 yards, including a 33-yard TD pass to Ernie Pierce. Pierce also scored on an 18-yard return of a blocked punt late in the game.

Kansas State has now lost 4 out of the last 5 games against Texas Tech. The two teams will play again in 2009 in Lubbock. Texas Tech leads the all-time series 6-3.

=== Texas A&M ===
| | 1 | 2 | 3 | 4 | Total |
|---|---|---|---|---|---|
| Kansas State | 7 | 20 | 3 | 14 | 44 |
| Texas A&M | 3 | 7 | 6 | 14 | 30 |

K-State had lost four games in a row to Texas A&M going into the game. Their last win against the Aggies came in 1997. The last win at Kyle Field came in 1996. Kansas State was favored by 3 going into the game.

Kansas State junior quarterback Josh Freeman completed 21 of 26 passes and ran for four touchdowns as Kansas State snapped its five-game losing streak to Texas A&M with a 44-30 win.

Courtney Herndon returned a blocked punt for a touchdown for the Wildcats (4-2, 1-1 Big 12), who moved the ball at will in the first half and led 27-10 at the break.

Sophomore quarterback Jerrod Johnson tried to rally the Aggies, but the comeback stalled when Kansas State's defense stuffed Jorvorskie Lane twice at the goal line midway through the fourth quarter.

Freeman led a 98-yard drive the other way and sealed the win on a short touchdown run with 4:37 left.

Johnson, starting again for the injured Stephen McGee, completed 29 of 41 passes for a school-record 419 yards. He also ran for a score and finished with 487 total yards, also a school record.

The Aggies (2-4), dropped to 0-2 in the Big 12 for the first time.

The Wildcats found the end zone on their opening drive for the fourth time this season. Freeman threw a 32-yard pass to Brandon Banks before scoring on a 12-yard run just over three minutes into the game.

Kansas State forced a punt by Justin Brantly, who was blocked by linebacker Reggie Walker. Herndon's touchdown made it 13-3. The Wildcats have returned four blocked punts for touchdowns this season.

The Wildcats glided down the field again on their next possession. Logan Dold finished the drive with a 4-yard TD run. Freeman went 6-for-7 and scampered for 12 yards on a fourth-and-1 from the Aggies 28.

Freeman finished a quick drive with another touchdown run with 4:20 left in the half. At that point, the Wildcats had 269 total yards and were averaging 7.7 yards per play.

On fourth down from the 1, Lane barreled into the end zone for his first touchdown of the season. Lane set two school records with his 46th career touchdown and his 45th rushing. He had been tied with Darren Lewis for first on both lists.

The Aggies drove to the Kansas State 2 early in the fourth quarter, but Lane was gang-tackled on third and fourth down.

After Kansas State's 98-yard drive, Johnson threw a 23-yard touchdown pass to Goodson. The Wildcats recovered the ensuing onside kick near midfield and Freeman scored again with 1:14 left.

Johnson threw a 55-yard touchdown pass to Tannehill in the final minute.

=== Colorado ===
| | 1 | 2 | 3 | 4 | Total |
|---|---|---|---|---|---|
| Kansas State | 6 | 0 | 7 | 0 | 13 |
| Colorado | 0 | 14 | 0 | 0 | 14 |

Going into the game, K-State had beaten Colorado two years in a row, including a win in Boulder in 2006. Colorado was favored by 3½. Colorado leads the all-time series 43-19-1.

The Colorado Buffaloes found an answer to their quarterback troubles, turning to freshman Tyler Hansen, who sparked them to a 14-13 win.

Cody Hawkins, the son of Buffs coach Dan Hawkins, was benched and switched offensive series with Tyler Hansen.

Although Hawkins mostly handed off to Rodney Stewart (29 carries for 141 yards), he also hit J.R. Smith for 22 yards on third-and-15 from his own 29 on the drive.

His fourth-and-4 pass to Smith, however, fell incomplete and Kansas State took over at its own 31 with 59 seconds remaining.

Josh Freeman’s fourth-down desperation heave to Brandon Banks at the Buffs’ 20-yard line was broken up by free safety Ryan Walters on the last play of the game.

Hansen finished a modest 7-of-14 for 71 yards with one touchdown and one interception, but he also ran 19 times for 86 yards, bringing a dimension that Hawkins doesn't have. Hawkins was 6-of-11 for 35 yards.

Trailing 6-0 and in need of a spark to break out of their monthlong slump, Hansen entered the game and promptly fumbled his first snap out of bounds. But on third-and-12 from his 28, Hansen gained 13 yards on a draw play and suddenly the Buffs, who snapped a three-game skid, had the momentum.

He drove them to the Kansas State 4, where Hawkins re-entered and handed off to Stewart, who ran into the end zone to give Colorado a 7-6 lead.

The next time Hansen drove the Buffs downfield, Hawkins stayed on the sideline and Hansen hit Scotty McKnight with a 21-yard touchdown pass down the left sideline for a 14-6 lead.

Brooks Rossman kicked field goals of 37 and 53 yards but was wide right from 47 yards and wide left from 42 in the first half.

The Wildcats pulled to 14-13 when Freeman scored untouched on 17-yard keeper early in the third quarter.

Colorado had a chance to pad its slim lead but Aric Goodman's 47-yard field goal try sailed wide right at the last moment. Goodman's 48-yard attempt in the first half was blocked by Ian Campbell, Kansas State's seventh block in seven games, best in the nation.

=== Oklahoma ===
| | 1 | 2 | 3 | 4 | Total |
|---|---|---|---|---|---|
| #4 Oklahoma | 28 | 27 | 0 | 3 | 58 |
| Kansas State | 14 | 14 | 7 | 0 | 35 |

Going into the game, K-State had lost four regular season games in a row to OU (2000, 2001, 2004 and 2005). K-State has now lost three games in a row to the Sooners. The Wildcats' last regular season win against the Sooners came in 1997 (and another win in 1996), though the Wildcats beat the Sooners in the 2003 Big 12 Championship Game, after losing in 2000 to OU in the Championship game. Oklahoma now leads the all-time series, 69-17-4. The game was scheduled for the 2008 Homecoming game. OU was favored by 19.

DeMarco Murray racked up 167 total yards and four touchdowns, and No. 4 Oklahoma sustained a 21-point Kansas State rally in the highest-scoring first half in school history to beat the Wildcats 58-35.

Sam Bradford added three TD passes in the first half in which the Sooners (7-1, 4-1 Big 12) give up a 28-7 lead before taking control by scoring 27 consecutive points.

The capper was a 68-yard punt return touchdown by redshirt freshman Ryan Broyles that gave the Sooners a 55-28 halftime lead. That total matched the school record for points in a half, set in the second half of Oklahoma's 76-0 shutout of the Wildcats in 1942.

Josh Freeman threw for a career-high 478 yards for K-State, with all three of his touchdown passes coming as the Wildcats charged back to tie it at 28.

But with 8 minutes left in the half, the Sooners found time to score four touchdowns.

Murray ended up running for 104 yards on 17 carries and making four catches for 63 yards, with two touchdowns each way. Chris Brown ran 20 times for 142 yards and one touchdown.

Bradford, who came in completing 71 percent of his passes, went only 13-for-32 for 255 yards. The 40 percent completion rate was the lowest of his career and only the second time more than half of his passes were incomplete.

Oklahoma looked as if it might cruise after snuffing out K-State's deceptive onside kick attempt after its first touchdown. After tailback Logan Dold threw an 8-yard touchdown pass to Deon Murphy on a trick play, kicker Brooks Rossman took a designed fall on his approach to the tee and backup Jared Parker kicked the ball instead.

The ball squirted loose momentarily before Jermaine Gresham pounced on it for the Sooners. Murray caught a 15-yard touchdown pass two plays later to make it 21-7, and Brown's 11-yard run stretched the lead to 21.

Freeman rallied K-State back with touchdown passes on three straight drives — a 77-yarder to Brandon Banks, a 29-yarder to Jeron Mastrud and a 9-yarder to Murphy to tie it up at 28.

Freeman's second touchdown pass pushed him past Ell Roberson’s school record for TDs in a career. Freeman now has 38 career touchdown passes and his single game passing total ranked only behind Chad May’s 489 yards against Nebraska in 1993.

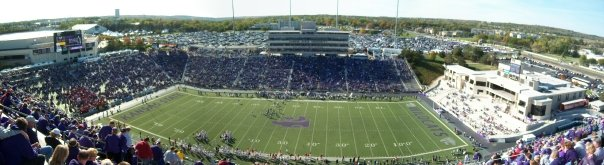
Oklahoma at Kansas State

=== Kansas ===
| | 1 | 2 | 3 | 4 | Total |
|---|---|---|---|---|---|
| Kansas State | 0 | 0 | 7 | 14 | 21 |
| Kansas | 21 | 10 | 14 | 7 | 52 |

The game was the 106th meeting between Kansas and Kansas State. Kansas has now won three years in a row, and four out of the last five. The Wildcats last beat the Jayhawks in Lawrence in 2002, by a score of 64-0. Heading into the game, the Jayhawks were favored by 8½.

Lamark Brown rushed for three scores but was outdone by KU running back Jake Sharp had 257 total yards and tied a school record with four touchdowns, as Kansas defeated Kansas State 52-21.

Kansas (6-3, 3-2 Big 12) was reeling after giving up more than 1,200 yards in losses to Oklahoma and Texas Tech the previous two weeks. The Jayhawks bounced back quickly, defeating Kansas State (4-5, 1-4).

Kansas ran for six touchdowns—one short of the school record—and harassed Kansas State quarterback Josh Freeman into four turnovers, giving him 14 during Kansas’ first three-game winning streak in the Sunflower Showdown since 1988-90.

Brown was the only bright spot for Kansas State, scoring on runs of 4, 11 and 1 yards, though all three came after the game was out of reach.

Sharp had 118 yards on nine carries and scored on runs of 4, 20 and 47 yards in the first quarter to put Kansas up 21-0. Sharp added a 2-yard touchdown run in the third to put Kansas up 45-7 and finished with a career-best 181 yards rushing. He also caught five passes for 76 yards.

On the other side of the ball, Kansas gave Freeman fits—again.

The junior had five interceptions and four fumbles his first two games against Kansas, and had given the ball away three more times before the first half was over in this one.

Freeman threw an interception on his third pass attempt of the game, the ball fluttering into the hands of Kansas’ Russel Brorsen at the Jayhawks’ 42 after he was hit from behind by defensive end Jake Laptad. Sharp scored 70 seconds later, bursting off right tackle on a 20-yard run.

Freeman finally got the Wildcats going late in the second quarter, converting a pair of fourth downs to get the Wildcats to the 1-yard line, only to lose the ball while trying to reach over the goal line. Kansas recovered and methodically marched 80 yards for a 15-yard touchdown run by quarterback Todd Reesing to go up 31-0.

Freeman's third turnover of the first half came on a Hail Mary pass in the end zone after Kansas State knocked down Jacob Branstetter's 33-yard field goal try, its nation-best eighth blocked kick of the season. Freeman also fumbled in the third quarter—Kansas State recovered—and threw his third interception in the fourth.

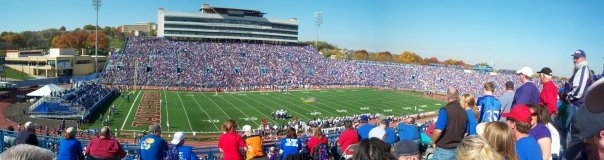
Kansas State players meet with coaches during a timeout

=== Missouri ===
| | 1 | 2 | 3 | 4 | Total |
|---|---|---|---|---|---|
| Kansas State | 0 | 3 | 7 | 14 | 24 |
| #13 Missouri | 7 | 17 | 3 | 14 | 41 |

K-State had beaten Mizzou 13 years in a row (including 14 of 15 years from 1991 to 2005). Mizzou finally ended the Wildcat dominance with wins in 2006, 2007 and 2008.

Jeremy Maclin scored three touchdowns and totaled 278 all-purpose yards, helping No. 13 Missouri shake off a slow start in its home finale and beat Kansas State 41-24 to grab first place in the Big 12 North.

Missouri (8-2, 4-2 Big 12) took control with 17 points in the final 5:46 of the half, including a pair of touchdown passes from Chase Daniel to Maclin. Maclin had eight receptions for 118 yards and two TDs, four carries for 84 yards and a third TD on a 56-yard jaunt on a direct snap.

Kansas State (4-6, 1-5) has lost five of six under head coach Ron Prince, the latest setback coming only three days after Prince was fired effective at the end of the season.

It was a feeling of helplessness for the Kansas State defense, after freshman Maclin scored three touchdowns and a school-record 360 yards total offense in Manhattan, Kan. Maclin entered the game averaging 189.67 all-purpose yards, second in the nation.

Kansas State scored twice, Brandon Banks’ 93-yard run and a 3-yard touchdown pass from Carson Coffman to Banks—in the final 1:11 to make the final appear respectable.

Missouri is 11-2 against the North the last three seasons and can clinch its second straight Big 12 championship game berth next week with a victory at Iowa State combined with a Kansas loss at home against No. 5 Texas.

Kansas State trailed 24-3 at the half and barely avoided getting shut out in the first 30 minutes for the second straight game, getting a 43-yard field goal from Brooks Rossman on the final play.

=== Nebraska ===
| | 1 | 2 | 3 | 4 | Total |
|---|---|---|---|---|---|
| Nebraska | 14 | 21 | 0 | 21 | 56 |
| Kansas State | 7 | 7 | 7 | 7 | 28 |

All-time, Nebraska leads the series 76-15-2. In 1998, K-State beat Nebraska in Manhattan for the first time since 1959. The Wildcats last beat Nebraska in 1968 (in Lincoln). Since then, K-State had beaten Nebraska four games in a row in Manhattan (wins in 1998, 2000, 2002 and 2004). Nebraska finally won in Manhattan in 2006 for the first time since 1996. Nebraska was favored by 6½ points going into the 2008 game.

Junior Brandon Banks tallied 167 yards in kick returns, including a 98-yard touchdown jaunt, as Kansas State dropped a 56-28 decision to Nebraska.

Nebraska senior quarterback Joe Ganz accounted for 365 total yards and four touchdowns and the Cornhuskers (7-4, 4-3 Big 12) dropped Kansas State for the fourth straight year.

The Huskers did it with a balanced attack this time, punishing the Wildcats (4-7, 1-6) at the line of scrimmage for 340 yards and four touchdowns rushing. They complemented it with Ganz's arm to finish with 610 total yards.

Nebraska established the running game early. Roy Helu Jr. scored on runs of 1 and 24 yards, and Quentin Castille had a 37-yarder on a fourth-and-1 late in the first quarter.

That set up Ganz, who had 270 yards and two touchdowns on 16-of-25 passing after his first attempt of the game was intercepted and returned for a touchdown. He also had 95 yards rushing on 11 carries, scoring on runs of 25 and 14 yards in the fourth quarter.

Josh Freeman, the nation's 13th-ranked passer at 292 yards per game, faced constant pressure and was sacked five times. He had to hurry or throw off his back foot on several other throws, going 7-for-18 for 114 yards before being replaced by Carson Coffman midway through the third quarter.

Kansas State's running game certainly didn't help, managing a dismal 59 yards on 32 carries.

Courtney Herndon intercepted Ganz's first pass of the afternoon and returned it 57 yards for a touchdown, then Freeman answered two Nebraska TDs by hitting Ernie Pierce on a 63-yard scoring pass to tie it at 14-all.

The momentum carried over to the defense, which held Nebraska to three plays and a punt.

Then Deon Murphy fumbled the punt at his own 30.

Helu scored two plays later on a 24-yard run. Ganz hit Todd Peterson for a 5-yard touchdown pass on the next possession, then found Mike McNeill for an 18-yard score to put Nebraska up 35-14.

Kansas State had a chance to pull closer in the closing seconds of the first half, but Nebraska pressured Freeman into an incompletion after Ron Prince decided to go for a touchdown instead of a field goal.

=== Iowa State ===
| | 1 | 2 | 3 | 4 | Total |
|---|---|---|---|---|---|
| Iowa State | 7 | 10 | 0 | 13 | 30 |
| Kansas State | 7 | 21 | 7 | 3 | 38 |

The Wildcats are 8-3 against the Cyclones since 1998. Iowa State leads the all-time series 49-39-4. Kansas State was favored by 9½ going into the game.

Josh Freeman threw four touchdown passes and Kansas State sent Ron Prince out a winner, beating Iowa State 38-30 three weeks after the Wildcats fired their embattled coach.

Prince, hired three seasons ago without any previous head coaching experience, leaves with a record of 17-20. The victory enabled the Wildcats (5-7, 2-6 Big 12) to squeeze past Iowa State (2-10, 0-8) and escape last place in the Big 12 North.

As of November 23, 2008, Kansas State has not hired a replacement for Prince, although athletic director Bob Krause said when announcing the firing that he wanted to pick a successor before the end of the season. Among those whose names have been mentioned are TCU coach Gary Patterson and former Kansas State coach Bill Snyder, who retired after the 2005 season and was followed by Prince.

Prince's Big 12 record got progressively worse, going from 4-4 in 2006 to 3-5 last year and 2-6 in 2008. Given a contract extension before this season, he was rewarded with a buyout of almost $1.3 million when he was fired but asked to stay for the three final games. The Wildcats got blown out by Missouri and Nebraska in their first two games with a lame duck coach.

The future could become similarly perilous for Gene Chizik, who is 5-19 in two seasons as Iowa State head coach. After winning their first two games, the Cyclones ended the season on a 10-game losing streak.

Austen Arnaud was 31-for-45 for 440 yards and three touchdowns for Iowa State, which lost its 17th straight on the road and has given up 226 points in its last five games.

Brandon Banks had seven catches for 116 yards for Kansas State, including a 20-yard touchdown, and became the sixth receiver in school history to go over 1,000 yards in a season.

It might also have been the last game at Kansas State for Freeman, the 6-foot-6 junior quarterback who holds career school records for attempts, completions, yards, touchdowns and total offense. Freeman, whose four TD passes tied a school record, has said he intends to come back for his senior season. But an early entry into the NFL might be tempting if he's assured of first-round draft status.

The most highly sought recruit Prince signed at Kansas State, Freeman was 17-for-30 for 279 yards and four TDs against Iowa State's weak defense. The four touchdown passes had been accomplished 12 other times.

Freeman showed on several throws why NFL scouts have been at every game. His first scoring pass was a beauty of a 44-yard strike to Deon Murphy, who was double-covered but caught the ball perfectly in stride. He also snapped off a 5-yard TD pass to Murphy that made it 35-17 in the third quarter and connected with Ernie Pierce on a 19-yard strike after Josh Moore interception.

Lamark Brown's 1-yard run gave Kansas State a 7-0 lead in the first quarter after Ian Campbell blocked his third field goal of the year, a Kansas State record.

Arnaud threw TD passes of 19 and 5 yards to R.J. Sumrall and 28 to Marquis Hamilton. His 5-yarder to Sumrall came as the final seconds of the season ticked off.

== Depth chart ==
Defensive starters

FS
Chris Carney (30)
Tysyn Hartman (2)

CB
Blair Irvin (6)
Ray Cheatham (23)

| ROLB | ILB | ILB | LOLB |
|---|---|---|---|
| Olu Hall (56) | Alex Hrebec (47) | Ulla Pomele (51) | Reggie Walker (53) |
| Antonio Felder (40) | Hansen Sekona (50) | John Houlik (39) | Antwon Moore (43) |

| LE | NT | RE |
|---|---|---|
| Brandon Harold (99) | Brandon Balkcom (92) | Ian Campbell (98) |
| Vlad Faustin (55) | Daniel Calvin (77) | Eric Childs (90) |

SS
Courtney Herdon (20)
Andrew Erker (36)

CB
Joshua Moore (4)
Otis Johnson (29)

Offensive starters

WR
Brandon Banks (83)
Matt Wykes
(84)

WR
Aubrey Quarles (89)
Ernie Pierce
(5)

| LT | LG | C | RG | RT |
|---|---|---|---|---|
| Alesana Alesana(78) | Colten Freeze (77) | Jordan Bedore (79) | Penisini Liu (63) | Nick Stringer (64) |
| Edward Prince (61) | Brock Unruh (76) | Zach Kendall (59) | Gerald Spexarth (73) | Penisini Liu (63) |

TE
Jeron Mastrud (85)
Brett Alstatt
(80)

WR
Deon Murphy (87)
Attrail Snipes (81)

QB
Josh Freeman (1)
Carson Coffman (14)

RB
Lamark Brown (7)
Logan Dold (28)

== Roster ==
2008 Kansas State Wildcats football roster
| Quarterbacks: 1 Josh Freeman - Jr.; 3 Bobby Hauver - Fr.; 10 Joseph Kassanavoid - Fr.; 12 Collin Klein - Fr.; 14 Carson Coffman - So.; 15 Trey Scott - (redshirt) Fr.; 18 Milton McPeek - Fr.; Running backs: 7 Lamark Brown - So.; 21 Frank Delarue - (redshirt) Fr.; 25 Keithen Valentine - Jr.; 26 Jarell Childs - Fr.; 28 Logan Dold - Fr.; 34 Dee Bell - (redshirt) Jr.; 35 Just Woods - (redshirt) Fr.; Wide receivers: 5 Ernie Pierce - Sr.; 8 Cameron Morrison - Jr.; 13 Jordan Daniels - Jr.; 20 Russell Simons - (redshirt) Jr.; 23 Steven Walters - Fr.; 24 Stephen Harrison - So.; 81 Attrail Snips - Jr.; 82 Adrian Hilburn - Jr.; 83 Brandon Banks - Jr.; 84 Matt Wykes - (redshirt) Jr.; 86 Stephen Didde - Fr.; 87 Deon Murphy - Jr.; 89 Aubrey Quarles - Jr.; Tight ends: 41 Jayson Cuba - Fr.; 46 Brent Draper - Sr.; 47 Gabe Gantz - So.; 48 Darrin Seiwart - Sr.; 80 Brett Alstatt- Sr.; 85 Jeron Mastrud - Jr. | Offensive line: 42 Corey Adams - (long snapper) So.; 54 Trevor Viers - Jr.; 59 Zach Kendall - So.; 61 Edward Prince - Jr.; 63 Penisine Liu - Sr.; 64 Nick Stringer - Jr.; 65 Aaron Jackson - Fr.; 66 Eric Benoit - (redshirt) Jr.; 67 Kenneth Mayfied - So.; 68 Brad Rooker - Sr.; 69 Nick Ward - (redshirt) Fr.; 70 Zach Hanson - So.; 71 Ethan Douglas - Fr.; 72 Kaleb Drinkgern - (redshirt) Fr.; 73 Gerard Spexarth - Sr.; 74 Wade Weibert - Jr.; 75 Clyde Aufner - (redshirt) Fr.; 76 Brock Unruh - Jr.; 77 Colten Freeze - (redshirt) Fr.; 78 Alesana Alesana - Sr.; 79 Jordan Bedore - Sr.; Defensive line: 52 Xzavier Steward - So.; 54 Dustin Sobieraj - (redshirt) Fr.; 55 Vlad Faustin - Sr.; 57 Pete Yemm - Sr.; 77 Daniel Calvin - Jr.; 90 Eric Childs - Jr.; 92 Brandon Balkom - Sr.; 93 Gabriel Crews - So.; 94 Raphael Guidry - (redshirt) Jr.; 95 Jeffrey Fitzgerald - Jr.; 96 Payton Kirk - (redshirt) Jr.; 98 Ian Campbell - Sr.; 99 Brandon Harold - Fr. | Linebackers: 24 Dahrnanz Tigner - So.; 32 Roman Fields - Fr.; 38 Jack Reed - Jr.; 39 John Houlik - Jr.; 40 Antonio Felder - Jr.; 43 Antwon Moore - Sr.; 44 Josh Berard - Jr.; 46 Ben Kall - Fr.; 47 Alex Hrebec- (redshirt) Fr.; 48 Cody Garrett - So.; 49 Aaron King - (redshirt) Fr.; 50 Hansen Sekona - Jr.; 51 Ulla Pomele - Jr.; 53 Reggie Walker - Sr.; 56 Olu Hall - Jr.; 58 Chris Bamberger - Sr.; 59 Brian Hertzog - (redshirt) Fr.; Defensive backs: 2 Tysn Hartman - (redshirt) Fr.; 3 Billy McClellan - Jr.; 4 Joshua Moore - (redshirt) So.; 6 Blair Irvin - Jr.; 8 Cedric Wilson - Sr.; 13 Adrian Stryker - Jr.; 17 Cole Bachamp - So.; 20 Courtney Herndon - Jr.; 22 Kendrick Matthews - So.; 23 Ray Cheatam - Sr.; 25 Craig Boswell - Jr.; 26 Brett Childers - Jr.; 28 Jase Hartenbower - Fr.; 29 John Tytla - Jr.; 29 Otis Johnson - Jr.; 30 Chris Carney - Jr.; 31 Tony Purvis - Jr.; 33 Mark St. Felix - (redshirt) Fr.; 35 Heath Alexander - Sr.; 36 Anderw Erker - Sr.; 37 Rashad Harrell - Jr.; Punters: 4 D.J. Fulhage - So.; 17 George Pierson - Jr.; Kickers: 6 Brandon Klimek - Fr.; 16 Brooks Rossman - Sr.; 18 Jared Parker - Sr.; 19 Josh Cherry - So. |

== Coaching staff ==
| Name | Position | Years at K-State |
|---|---|---|
| Ron Prince | Head coach | 3 |
| Tim Tibesar | Defensive Coordinator | 3 |
| Dave Brock | Offensive Coordinator | 2 |
| Jeff Rodgers | Special Teams | 1 |
| Ricky Rahne | Running Backs | 2 |
| Warren Ruggiero | Quarterbacks | 1 |
| Cornell Jackson | Linebackers | 1 |
| Tim McCarty | Assistant Head Coach, Offensive Line | 3 |
| Mo Latimore | Defensive Line | 23 |
| Frank Leonard | Tight Ends | 2 |
| Total | | 41 |

== Statistics ==
Stats accurate as of 12/22/2008.

=== Team ===
| | KSU | Opp |
|---|---|---|
| Scoring | 419 | 430 |
| Points per game | 36.9 | 35.8 |
| First downs | 250 | 302 |
| Rushing | 93 | 135 |
| Passing | 138 | 151 |
| Penalty | 19 | 16 |
| Total offense | 4,825 | 5,749 |
| Avg per play | 5.8 | 6.2 |
| Avg per game | 402.1 | 479.1 |
| Fumbles-Lost | 24-14 | 15-7 |
| Penalties-Yards | 67-549 | 84-662 |
| Avg per game | 45.8 | 55.2 |

| | KSU | Opp |
|---|---|---|
| Punts-Yards | 44-1,661 | 53-1,794 |
| Avg per punt | 37.8 | 33.8 |
| Time of possession/Game | 27:40 | 32:20 |
| 3rd down conversions | 68/165 | 83/180 |
| 4th down conversions | 18/35 | 11/22 |
| Touchdowns scored | 56 | 58 |
| Field goals-Attempts-Long | 9-12-53 | 10-15-41 |
| PAT-Attempts | 54-55 | 50-56 |
| Attendance | 316,327 | 293,555 |
| Games/Avg per Game | 7/45,190 | 5/58,711 |

==== Scores by quarter ====
| | 1 | 2 | 3 | 4 | Total |
|---|---|---|---|---|---|
| Opponents | 104 | 151 | 70 | 105 | 430 |
| K-State | 107 | 121 | 97 | 94 | 419 |

=== Offense ===
==== Rushing ====
| Name | GP | Att | Gain | Loss | Net | Avg | TD | Long | Avg/G |
|---|---|---|---|---|---|---|---|---|---|
| Lamark Brown | 9 | 118 | 458 | 46 | 412 | 3.5 | 5 | 28 | 45.8 |
| Josh Freeman | 12 | 107 | 538 | 134 | 404 | 3.8 | 14 | 29 | 33.7 |
| Logan Dold | 10 | 82 | 336 | 3 | 333 | 4.1 | 3 | 19 | 33.3 |
| Total | 12 | 408 | 1,839 | 249 | 1,590 | 3.9 | 26 | 93 | 132.5 |
| Opponents | 12 | 502 | 2,894 | 282 | 2,612 | 5.2 | 31 | 69 | 217.7 |

==== Passing ====
| Name | GP-GS | Effic | Att-Cmp-Int | Pct | Yds | TD | Lng | Avg/G |
|---|---|---|---|---|---|---|---|---|
| Josh Freeman | 12-12 | 136.5 | 224-382-8 | 58.6 | 2,945 | 20 | 77 | 245.4 |
| Carson Coffman | 6-0 | 117.0 | 25-41-2 | 61.0 | 282 | 1 | 51 | 47.0 |
| Opponents | 12 | 138.3 | 257-424-10 | 60.6 | 3,137 | 26 | 55 | 261.4 |

==== Receiving ====
| Name | GP | No. | Yds | Avg | TD | Long | Avg/G |
|---|---|---|---|---|---|---|---|
| Brandon Banks | 12 | 67 | 1,049 | 15.7 | 9 | 77 | 87.4 |
| Jeron Mastrud | 12 | 38 | 435 | 11.4 | 2 | 52 | 36.2 |
| Deon Murphy | 12 | 37 | 555 | 15.0 | 6 | 70 | 46.2 |
| Aubrey Quarles | 12 | 34 | 407 | 12.0 | 1 | 36 | 33.9 |
| Ernie Pierce | 12 | 27 | 424 | 15.7 | 3 | 63 | 35.3 |
| Total | 12 | 250 | 3,235 | 12.9 | 22 | 77 | 269.6 |
| Opponents | 12 | 257 | 3,137 | 12.2 | 26 | 55 | 261.4 |
