= Ian Campbell (American football) =

American gridiron football player (born 1985)

Profile
- Position: Defensive end

Personal information
- Born: May 15, 1985 (age 41); Garden City, Kansas, U.S.
- Listed height: 6 ft 4 in (1.93 m)
- Listed weight: 255 lb (116 kg)

Career information
- High school: Cimarron (KS)
- College: Kansas State
- NFL draft: 2009: undrafted

Career history
- St. Louis Rams (2009)*; Montreal Alouettes (2010)*
- * Offseason or practice squad member only

Awards and highlights
- 2× First-team All-Big 12 (2006, 2007); 1× Second-team All-Big 12 (2008)

Ian Cade Campbell (born May 15, 1985, in Garden City, Kansas) is an American former college football player who was a starting defensive end for the Kansas State Wildcats. He was a walk-on and a two-time team captain for the Wildcats.

== High school ==
Campbell went to high school at Cimarron High School. He earned All-Hi Plains League, All-Area, Hutchinson all-area 3A top 11 and 3A all-state honorable mention honors as a junior linebacker. He also received all-league, all-area, Hutchinson all-area 3A Top 11 and honorable mention all-state honors at linebacker as a senior. He set the career tackle record for Cimarron with 324 tackles and also lettered three years in basketball.

== College ==
=== 2004 ===
Campbell redshirted the 2004 season.

=== 2005 ===
He appeared in 10 of 11 of the Wildcats' games. He blocked a punt against Missouri that was returned for a touchdown. He earned team's Purple Pride award as the top walk-on, displaying quality play, leadership and work ethic.

=== 2006 ===
He was one of five Wildcats to start and appear in all 13 games. Campbell earned consensus First-team All-Big 12 honors from the league's coaches, the Associated Press, The Kansas City Star, the Dallas Morning News, the Fort Worth Star-Telegram, the Houston Chronicle and the San Antonio Express-News. He was named Big 12 Defensive Player of the Year by the Houston Chronicle. He was a semi-finalist for the Hendricks Award. He was also an honorable mention All-American by CNN/SI.com. Campbell finished third on the team in total tackles with 67 and led the Wildcats in both tackles for losses (17.5) and sacks (11.5). His tackle total ranked No. 1 among all Big 12 defensive linemen. He led the Big 12 and ranked 18th nationally in tackles for losses. His sack total tied the K-State single-season record, while ranking No. 2 in the Big 12 and 10th nationally. He also ranked third in the Big 12 with three fumble recoveries in conference games. He collected at least one sack in 9 of 13 games.

=== 2007 ===
To start the season, Campbell was switched from defensive lineman to outside linebacker to accommodate Ron Prince's 3-4 defense. He seem to struggle but he was a First-team All-Big 12 linebacker by the league's coaches and Second-team All-Big 12 linebacker by the Associated Press, The Kansas City Star and the Waco Tribune-Herald. After the 2007 season he ranked sixth all-time at K-State with 16 career sacks. Started all 12 games at either end or linebacker. He recorded 45 tackles, including a team-best 11 tackles for loss. Campbell led the Big 12 with four fumble recoveries, which also was one shy of the school record.

=== 2008 ===
Campbell had another strong year, earning Second-team All-Big 12 defensive lineman honors. He closed out his senior season strong with 4.5 sacks and 47 tackles, and 8 tackles for loss. Campbell recorded his best games of the 2008 season against Louisiana and Iowa State, carding 11 tackles, 1.5 sacks and a pass break up against the Ragin’ Cajuns, while closing out his career with 10 stops and a blocked field goal against the Cyclones.

Campbell ranks sixth in school history with 20.5 career sacks and compiled 37.5 tackles for loss in his career.

=== Statistics ===
Year	Team	G	TCK	TFL	Sacks	INT	FF	FR
2005	Kansas State	10	35	1	0	0	0	0
2006	Kansas State	13	68	17.5	11.5	0	1	3
2007	Kansas State	12	47	11	4.5	1	1	4
2008	Kansas State	12	49	8	4.5	0	0	1
Totals		47	166	37.5	20.5	1	2	8

== NFL ==
=== St. Louis Rams ===
On April 26, 2009, was signed by the St. Louis Rams as an undrafted free agent. He received a two- year, $705,000 contract from the Rams, with none guaranteed. He was cut during final cuts on September 5. He was re-signed to the teams' practice squad, but released from it a week later.

== CFL ==
On April 13, 2010, was signed for a two-year contract plus an option with the Montreal Alouettes but was released prior to seeing any game action.

== Personal ==
Campbell is the son of Curtis and Audrey Campbell. Campbell has five siblings and he enjoys lifting weights, riding motorcycles, and serving patrons at his restaurant, Black Lion's Den.
