= Brandon Banks =

American football player (born 1987)

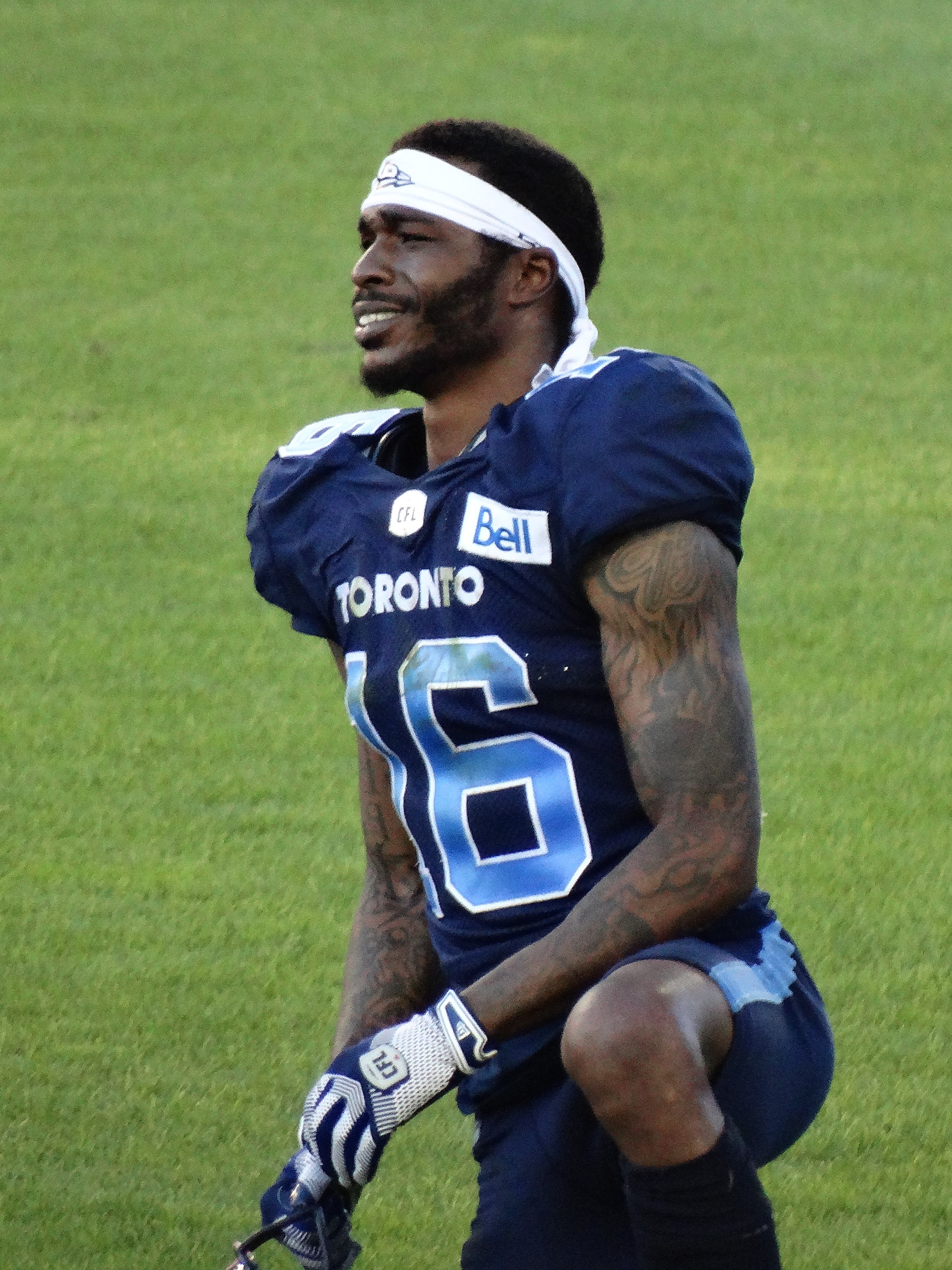
- Banks with the Toronto Argonauts in 2022

No. 16
- Positions: Wide receiver, return specialist

Personal information
- Born: December 21, 1987 (age 38); Raleigh, North Carolina, U.S.
- Listed height: 5 ft 7 in (1.70 m)
- Listed weight: 150 lb (68 kg)

Career information
- High school: Garner (Garner, North Carolina)
- College: Bakersfield (2006–2007); Kansas State (2008–2009)
- NFL draft: 2010: undrafted

Career history
- Washington Redskins (2010–2012); Hamilton Tiger-Cats (2013–2021); Toronto Argonauts (2022)

Awards and highlights
- Grey Cup champion (2022); CFL's Most Outstanding Player Award (2019); Terry Evanshen Trophy (2019); 4× CFL All-Star (2014, 2015, 2018, 2019); 6× CFL East All-Star (2014–2019); NFL kickoff return yards leader (2011); Third-team All-American (2009); Big 12 Special Teams Player of the Year (2009); Big 12 Offensive Newcomer of the Year (2008); First-team All-Big 12 (2009)

Career NFL statistics
- Receptions: 11
- Receiving yards: 35
- Return yards: 3,793
- Return touchdowns: 1
- Stats at Pro Football Reference

Career CFL statistics
- Receptions: 422
- Receiving yards: 5,678
- Receiving touchdowns: 44
- Rushing touchdowns: 5
- Return touchdowns: 13
- Stats at CFL.ca
- Canadian Football Hall of Fame (Class of 2026)

Brandon DeSean Banks (born December 21, 1987) is an American former professional football wide receiver and return specialist in the National Football League (NFL) and Canadian Football League (CFL). He was signed by the NFL's Washington Redskins as an undrafted free agent in 2010. He also played in the CFL for the Hamilton Tiger-Cats and Toronto Argonauts. He played college football at Bakersfield College and for the Kansas State Wildcats. Banks was the lightest active player in the NFL and CFL when he played at 150 pounds. He was inducted into the Canadian Football Hall of Fame in 2026.

== Early life ==
Banks was a four-year starter and two-time all-conference selection at Garner Magnet High School in Garner, North Carolina. He led the Trojans to three consecutive conferences championships and a 33–5 record over his final three seasons. In 2017, he was inducted into the school Hall of Fame.

=== Track and field ===
Banks was named to the 2006 USA Today All-USA high school track and field team after posting a 10.42 in the 100-meter and a 21.44 in the 200-meter.

Personal bests

Event	Time (seconds)	Date
60 meters	6.80	March 12, 2006
100 meters	10.42	June 16, 2006
200 meters	21.44	June 29, 2006

== College career ==
=== Junior college ===
As a Bakersfield College Renegade, Banks earned first-team All-America honors from JC Gridwire as an all-purpose player/wide receiver. He was also named a PrepStar JUCO All-American. He helped lead Bakersfield to a No. 1 national ranking, a 12–1 record on the season and a berth in the Southern California championship game. His 15 touchdowns set a school record.

=== Kansas State ===
Banks transferred to Kansas State to begin the 2008 season.

Banks became the second straight Wildcat to earn offensive newcomer of the year accolades after Deon Murphy took the honor in 2007. In all, Kansas State has had eight players earn conference newcomer of the year honors since 1996.

He had one of the best seasons in school history for a junior wide receiver after collecting 67 receptions for 1,049 yards and nine touchdowns. He became the sixth player in school history to reach 1,000 receiving yards in a season and his 67 catches and 1,049 receiving yards were the most by a Wildcat junior for a single season.

Banks also contributed on special teams in 2008 as he collected 498 yards on 18 kickoff returns and five punt returns for 58 yards. His 98-yard kickoff return against Nebraska tied for the fifth-longest in school history. Banks' 1,731 total all-purpose yardage in 2008 ranks fifth in single-season school history, while his 144.2 all-purpose yards per game mark checks in at No. 8 on the Kansas State single-season records chart. He was a first team Big 12 Conference selection on special teams and he was a second team All-American his senior year.

== Professional career ==
Pre-draft measurables
Height	Weight	Arm length	Hand span	40-yard dash	10-yard split	20-yard split	20-yard shuttle	Three-cone drill	Vertical jump	Broad jump
5 ft 6 3/4 in (1.70 m)	149 lb (68 kg)	30 in (0.76 m)	8 1/4 in (0.21 m)	4.43 s	1.56 s	2.58 s	4.29 s	6.88 s	33 in (0.84 m)	9 ft 5 in (2.87 m)
All values from NFL Combine/Pro Day

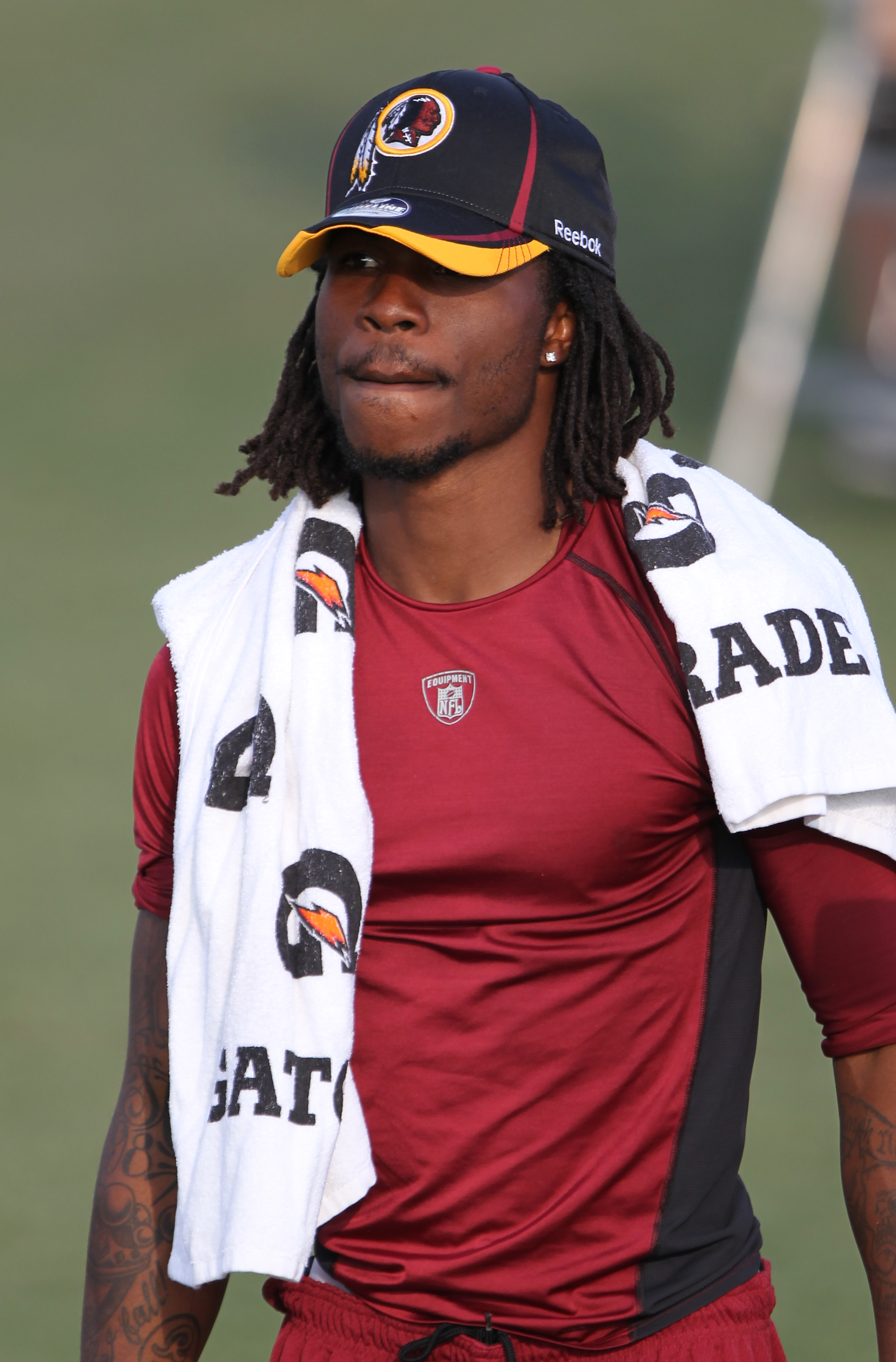
Banks during Washington Redskins training camp in 2011.

=== Washington Redskins ===
After the 2010 NFL draft, the Washington Redskins signed Banks as an undrafted free agent on May 17, 2010. He returned a punt 77 yards for a touchdown in the first preseason game against the Buffalo Bills on August 13, and was shortly thereafter given the nickname, "Crazy Legs Banks". Against the New York Jets, however, he fumbled a return and had inconsistent play against the Baltimore Ravens, which included a second lost fumble. The Redskins released Banks on September 26, but re-signed him to the practice squad on September 29. In his first regular season NFL game, Banks returned his first punt 51 yards against the Philadelphia Eagles which set up a Redskin touchdown. In Week 5 against the Green Bay Packers, his responsibilities expanded to include both punt and kick return duties. Banks recorded three punt returns for 47 yards and two kickoff returns for 33 yards, while a 62-yard kickoff return was negated by a holding penalty. In Week 6 against the Indianapolis Colts, Banks blocked a 48-yard field goal attempt by Adam Vinatieri. On October 31 against the Lions, Banks totaled 271 return yards, setting a franchise record. His 96-yard kickoff return midway through the fourth quarter was the Redskins' first kick return for a touchdown in 70 games, and the first of Banks' career. In Week 12, Banks ran a 77-yard punt return in a home game against the Minnesota Vikings for a touchdown to give the Redskins a lead late in the game, but a penalty called on Perry Riley negated the return and the Redskins lost.

Starting the 2011 season off slow, Banks would finally have an impressive 55-yard punt return before being pushed out of bounds in the second game against the Dallas Cowboys. In Week 14 against the New England Patriots, Rex Grossman gave the ball to Roy Helu, who then gave it to Banks; Banks then threw a 49-yard touchdown pass to Santana Moss. The pass was the first of Banks' career. Later in Week 16 against the Minnesota Vikings, Banks took a reverse handoff for a 59-yard touchdown run, but just like his punt return touchdown in the previous meeting between the two teams in the 2010 season, it was nullified by a penalty on Darrel Young. On the next play, Rex Grossman threw an interception and the Redskins went on to lose the game.

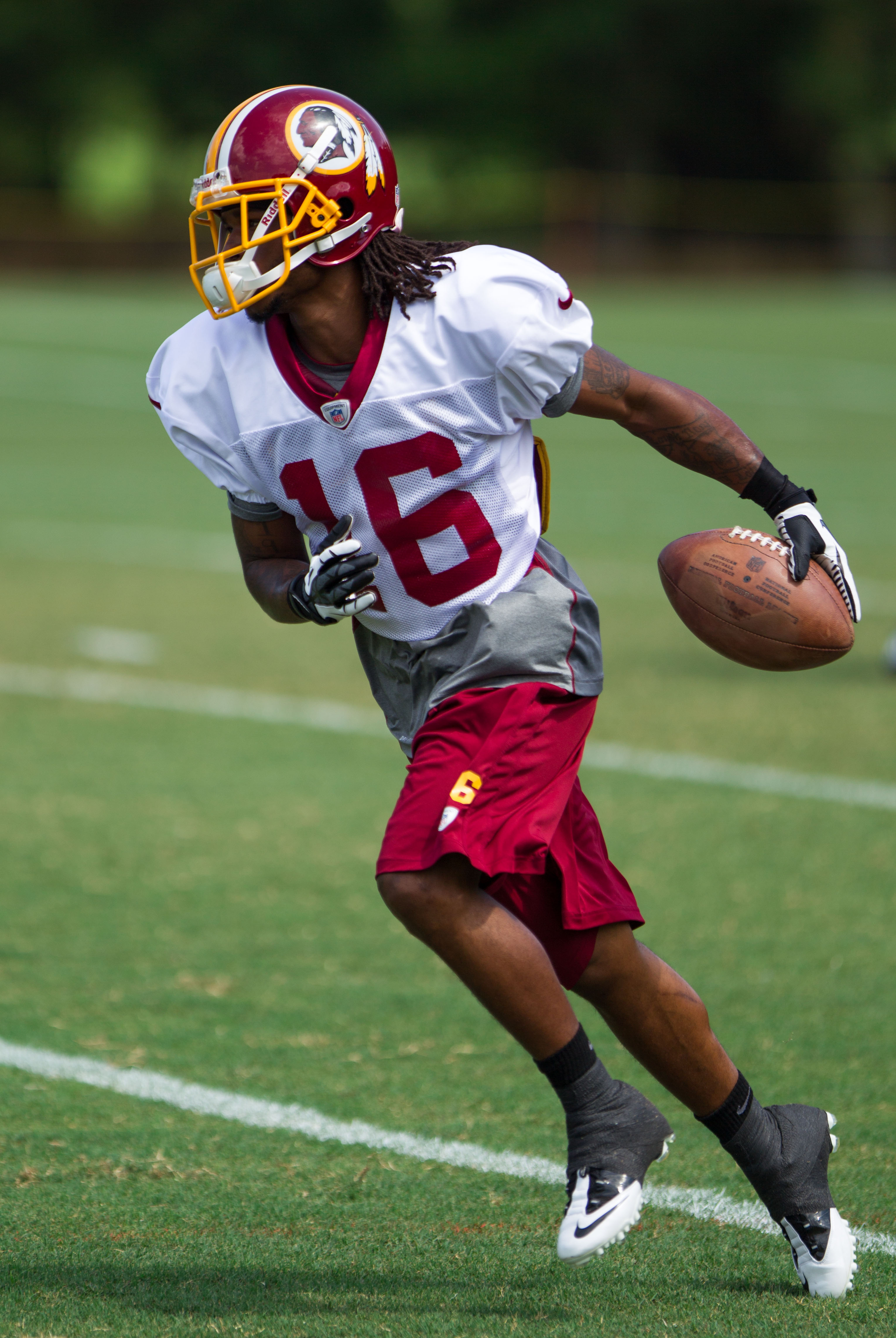
Banks at Redskins training camp in 2012.

During the 2012 preseason, coach Mike Shanahan announced that he expected Banks to contribute more as receiver if he was to make the team. To prepare for the season, Banks gained an additional ten pounds. Against the Chicago Bears in the second game of the preseason, Banks returned a punt 91 yards for a touchdown. In the last preseason game against the Tampa Bay Buccaneers, he caught a 47-yard pass from Kirk Cousins, as well as rushed for 43 yards on a reverse. Banks made the final 53-man roster by the start of the 2012 season after much controversy over whether or not he could contribute to the team as more than a return specialist. After being ineffective for most of the season, Banks was put on the inactive list in the Week 14 game against the Baltimore Ravens as the Redskins used Niles Paul and Richard Crawford to take over his return duties.

Set to become a restricted free agent for the 2013 season, it was reported that the Redskins planned on letting Banks enter free agency with no plans to re-sign him.

=== Hamilton Tiger-Cats ===
Banks signed with the Hamilton Tiger-Cats on September 30, 2013. He played in the final 4 regular season games of the 2013 CFL season with the Hamilton Tiger-Cats of the Canadian Football League (CFL). He was named the Special Teams Player of the Week for Week 18 of the 2013 CFL season for returning a missed field goal for the game-winning touchdown to clinch home-field advantage in the Eastern Semi-finals. In his second season in the league Banks returned two punts for touchdowns in the Tiger-Cats's 40-24 win over the Montreal Alouettes in the Eastern Final, advancing the Tiger-Cats to the 102nd Grey Cup. An additional punt return was called back because of a penalty. In the 102nd Grey Cup, Banks recorded a 45-yard receiving touchdown, while an apparent punt return touchdown with under a minute left in the game was called back due to an illegal block. He recorded 1,968 combined yards during the regular season. His performance earned him his first CFL All-Star award.

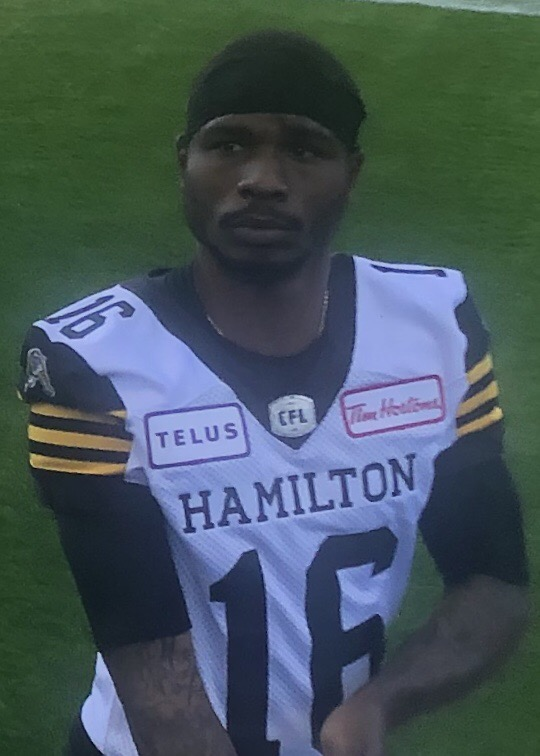
Banks before a Hamilton Tiger-Cats game in 2019.

Banks saw a reduced workload in the receiving game in his third season in the CFL, despite playing in all 18 regular season games. He caught 22 passes for 220 yards, but carried the ball a career-high 20 times for 87 yards. He set personal bests across the board in both punt and kick return. In total he touched the ball 164 times (average of 9.1 times a game) for 2,070 yards with six touchdowns. He was named a CFL All-Star for the second consecutive season.

Banks played in the first 15 games of the 2016 regular season before being suspended for two of the final three games of the year: He tested positive for a banned substance (Methylenedioxyamphetamine). Banks finished the season having amassed 2,082 kickoff return yards and scoring three return touchdowns. He was the East division nomination for Special Teams Player of the Year.

Banks had a breakout season as a wide receiver in 2017, setting new career highs in receptions (67) yards (1,011) and touchdowns (8). For the first eight games of the season under head coach Kent Austin Banks only caught eight passes for 52 yards, however under new head coach June Jones Banks' involvement and productivity skyrocketed. In the final 10 games of the season Banks caught 59 passes for 959 yards with eight touchdowns. Banks improved on his strong 2017 season, with an even more productive 2018 season; catching setting new career highs in receptions (94) yards (1,423) and touchdowns (11). He suffered a broken clavicle in the team's Week 19 loss to the Ottawa Redblacks, causing him to miss the remainder of the season. At the time of the injury Banks was second in the league in receptions and yards, and tied for first with teammate Luke Tasker for most receiving touchdowns. On January 28, 2019 Banks and the Tiger-Cats agreed to a two-year contract extension. Banks continued his excellent play into the 2019 season where in the penultimate game of the season he set the franchise record for most receptions in a season with 112. Banks was also named to his 6th consecutive Divisional All-Star list. Banks was later named the CFL's Most Outstanding Player for his play in the 2019 season. He re-signed with the Tiger-Cats on December 31, 2020. The 2020 season was cancelled due to the COVID-19 pandemic. Banks played in the first four games of the 2021 season catching 22 passes for 172 yards before suffering a rib injury. The injury caused him to miss the next three games, before briefly returning to action in Week 9, and then also missing Week 10 due to lingering pain. He became a free agent upon the expiry of his contract on February 8, 2022.

=== Toronto Argonauts ===
On February 13, 2022, it was announced that Banks had signed with the Toronto Argonauts. He won his first ever Grey Cup with the Argonauts in Regina, Saskatchewan on November 20, the 109th Grey Cup. After one season with the club Banks was released by the Argos on January 3, 2023.

On June 4, 2026, before the Tiger-Cats' home opener, Banks signed a ceremonial one-day contract to retire as a member of the team. During halftime of the game, he was announced as an inductee into the Canadian Football Hall of Fame as part of the class of 2026.

== Career statistics ==
=== Professional ===
General			Receiving						Punt return				
Year	Team	GP	Rec	Tar	Yds	Avg	Lng	TD	Ret	Yds	Avg	Lng	TD
2010	WAS	12	2	5	10	5.0	8	0	38	431	11.3	53	0
2011	WAS	16	1	1	10	10.0	10	0	36	328	9.1	55	0
2012	WAS	13	8	8	15	1.9	15	0	26	178	6.8	27	0
2013	HAM	5	9	16	95	10.6	37	0	17	107	6.3	15	0
2014	HAM	14	42	58	529	12.6	69	5	60	618	10.3	97	1
2015	HAM	18	22	36	220	10.0	42	1	75	930	12.4	96	4
2016	HAM	16	32	47	376	11.8	51	4	61	588	9.6	86	1
2017	HAM	18	67	105	1,011	15.1	65	8	38	385	10.1	65	1
2018	HAM	14	94	129	1,423	15.1	78	11	19	186	9.8	34	0
2019	HAM	16	112	158	1,550	13.8	60	13	13	140	10.8	41	0
2021	HAM	10	44	70	474	10.8	34	2	15	95	6.3	16	0
2022	TOR	16	37	75	522	14.1	53	4	24	163	6.8	35	0
NFL totals		41	11	14	35	3.2	15	0	100	937	9.4	55	0
CFL totals		127	453	694	6,200	13.7	78	48	322	3,212	10.0	97	7

=== College ===
Year	GP	Rec.	Yards	Avg	Long	TD
2008	12	67	1,049	15.7	77	9
2009	12	56	705	12.6	64	1
Total	24	123	1,754	14.3	77	10

== Personal life ==
Banks is known for performing the John Wall Dance as his touchdown celebration. Banks is good friends with John Wall, who played 11 seasons in the National Basketball Association, most notably with the Washington Wizards. They both grew up together in the Raleigh, North Carolina area and at one point in time both played professionally in Washington, D.C. He has three children.
