= Washington State University System =

Public university system in Washington, USA

The Washington State University System is a system of public universities in the U.S. state of Washington. It consists of six campuses: Washington State University (its flagship/main campus), Washington State University Everett, Washington State University Spokane, Washington State University Tri-Cities, Washington State University Vancouver, and Washington State University Global Campus.

The system is governed by the ten-member Washington State University Board of Regents.

== History ==
The Washington State University System was originally created on May 10, 1989, after the Washington State Legislature authorized the creation of three branch campuses for Washington State University, evolving it from a one-campus university to a multi-campus university.

The system went through a restructuring that began to go into effect on July 1, 2022. In response to tremendous growth of WSU's branch campuses in the 30+ years since their establishment, the restructuring, known as OneWSU, decentralizes control of the branch campuses from Washington State University's main campus in Pullman. The move was made to allow each campus to be more autonomous, while still adhering to shared guiding principles of the WSU System. As part of the restructuring, WSU Pullman appointed its first chancellor, Elizabeth Chilton, with president Kirk Schulz handing over Pullman campus duties to the chancellor. Final implementation of the OneWSU restructuring will go into effect by Fall 2023.
