= Noel Schulz =

American electrical engineer

Noel Nunnally Schulz is an American electrical engineer. She is the Bob Ferguson Endowed Professor in the Washington State University School of Electrical Engineering & Computer Science, and the inaugural director of the university's Institute for Northwest Energy Futures.

== Education and career ==
Schulz is originally from Blacksburg, Virginia, and is the daughter of electrical engineering professor Charles Nunnally; her mother was a schoolteacher. She met her future husband, chemical engineer Kirk Schulz, when they were both undergraduates at Virginia Tech; they married in 1987. She graduated in 1988, and received a master's degree from Virginia Tech in 1990. Her husband became a professor at North Dakota State University; she returned to graduate study and completed a Ph.D. at the University of Minnesota, in 1995.

In 2007, Schulz became Tennessee Valley Authority Professor in power systems engineering at Mississippi State University. In 2009, her husband became president of Kansas State University, and she became Paslay Professor of Electrical Engineering there. At Kansas State, she directed the Engineering Experimental Station and Electrical Power Affiliates Program, and in 2012 became associate dean of engineering. She also served as president of the IEEE Power & Energy Society for the 2012–2013 term.

== Recognition ==
Schulz was elected as an IEEE Fellow in 2016, "for leadership in advancing women in engineering and electric ship technologies".
