= Duane Acker =

American academic (1931–2024)

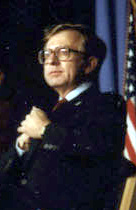

President of Kansas State University
- In office 1975–1986
- Preceded by: James McCain
- Succeeded by: Jon Wefald

Personal details
- Born: March 13, 1931 Atlantic, Iowa, U.S.
- Died: December 13, 2024 (aged 93) Atlantic, Iowa, U.S.
- Spouse: Shirley Hansen
- Children: 2

Duane Calvin Acker (March 13, 1931 – December 13, 2024) was an American academic who served as the president of Kansas State University from 1975 to 1986. Acker attended Iowa State University and Oklahoma State University and held B.S., M.S., and Ph.D. degrees in animal husbandry. He has taught at Iowa State University, Kansas State University, South Dakota State University, and the University of Nebraska–Lincoln. He also served as administrator of the International Cooperation and Development and Foreign Agricultural Service from 1990 to 1993, and as assistant secretary of USDA for Science and Education. Acker died in Atlantic on December 13, 2024, at the age of 93.
