= Ron Prince =

American football coach (born 1969)

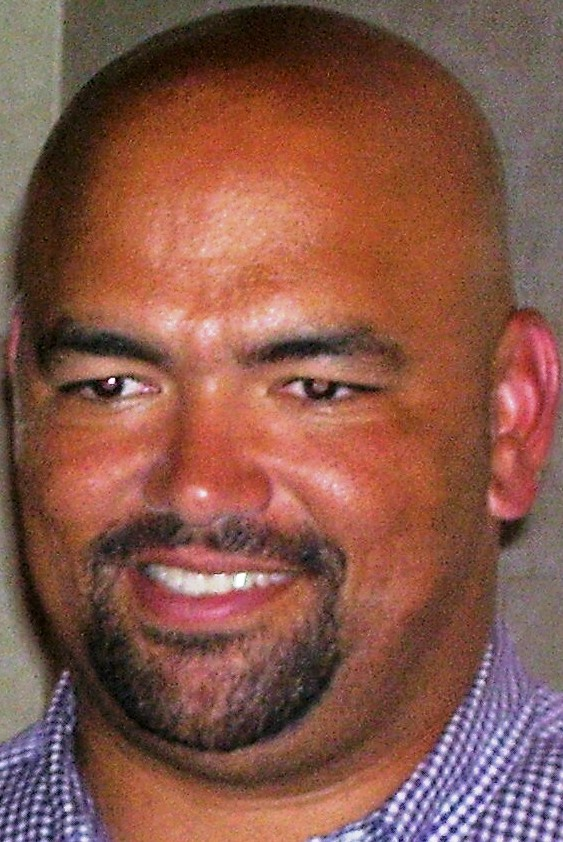
- Prince in 2006

Profile
- Position: Tackle

Personal information
- Born: September 18, 1969 (age 57); Omaha, Nebraska, U.S.

Career information
- High school: Junction City (KS)
- College: Appalachian State

Career history
- Dodge City (1992) Volunteer coach; Alabama A&M (1993) Offensive line coach; South Carolina State (1994) Offensive line coach; James Madison (1995–1997) Offensive line coach; Cornell (1998–2000) Offensive line coach; Virginia (2001–2002) Offensive line coach; Virginia (2003–2005) Offensive coordinator; Kansas State (2006–2008) Head coach; Virginia (2009) Special teams coach; Indianapolis Colts (2010–2011) Assistant offensive line coach; Jacksonville Jaguars (2012) Assistant offensive line coach; Rutgers (2013) Offensive coordinator; Detroit Lions (2014–2015) Assistant head coach & tight ends coach; Detroit Lions (2015–2017) Assistant head coach & offensive line coach; Michigan (2018) Offensive analyst; Howard (2019) Head coach

Head coaching record
- Regular season: NCAA: 18–27 (.400)
- Postseason: Bowl games: 0–1 (.000)
- Career: NCAA: 18–28 (.391)

Ronald Dale Prince (born September 18, 1969) is an American football coach. He served as the head football coach at Kansas State University from 2006 to 2008 and Howard University in 2019, compiling a career college football head coaching record of 18–28. Prince was the assistant head coach and offensive line coach for the Detroit Lions of the National Football League (NFL) from 2015 to 2017.

== College coaching career ==
=== Early years ===
From 1993 through 2002, Prince worked at five college football programs as offensive line coach: Alabama A&M, South Carolina State, James Madison, Cornell, and Virginia. From 2003 through 2005, he was the offensive coordinator for Virginia under head coach Al Groh.

=== Kansas State ===
Prince succeeded head coach Bill Snyder at Kansas State following the 2005 season. When he began his first season at Kansas State in 2006, he was 36 years old and the third-youngest head coach in the NCAA Division I Football Bowl Subdivision.

During the 2006 season, Prince led Kansas State to its first winning record since 2003 with a 7–6 mark, as well as a berth in the inaugural Texas Bowl. The hallmark win of the regular season was a 45–42 upset of then #4 Texas on November 11, 2006. However, the Wildcats lost to intrastate rival Kansas 39–20. Kansas State lost the 2006 Texas Bowl to #16 Rutgers, 37–10.

In Prince's second season, Kansas State slipped to a 5–7 record. The Wildcats suffered a second straight loss to Kansas 30–24 and ended the season on a four-game losing streak, which included surrendering 73 points in a loss to Nebraska.

On National Signing Day in February 2008, 19 junior college recruits signed to play football at Kansas State, although only 15 of them were able to enroll in the fall. As a result, Kansas State's 2008 recruiting class reportedly contained more junior college players than any other class ever compiled by current BCS teams. Many criticized it as "panicking" to get quick-fix players, while others praised Prince's strategy, pointing out predecessor Bill Snyder's success with junior college players.

On August 7, 2008, Prince agreed to a new contract through the 2012 season. The deal was retroactive to January 1, 2008, and ran through December 31, 2012, replacing the original contract signed in December 2005. Prince's base salary for 2008 was $143,000 with a total guaranteed package of $1.1 million, which also included payments from endorsements such as television, radio, internet, personal appearances and apparel. Prince could have earned up to an additional $950,000 per year in performance-based incentives.

Despite the influx of junior college talent and the presence of future first-round pick Josh Freeman at quarterback, the Wildcats showed little improvement during the 2008 season. The team stumbled to another 5–7 finish, including a 2-6 conference record. After a third-straight loss to Kansas, which saw the Wildcats lose by 31 points, university officials announced on November 5, 2008, that Prince would not return as head coach in 2009. He finished his tenure 0–9 against Kansas, Missouri, and Nebraska.

On November 5, 2008, Prince was fired from his position as head coach. He received a $1.2 million buyout and an additional $150,000 of a $250,000 longevity bonus.

==== Kansas State buyout ====
On May 20, 2009, Kansas State University and its athletic corporation filed suit to have an allegedly secret agreement between Prince and former athletic director Bob Krause from 2008 declared invalid. The agreement required Kansas State to pay a total of $3.2 million in three deferred payments to a corporation called In Pursuit of Perfection, LLC, if the school terminated Prince before December 31, 2008. The payments were scheduled to be made in 2015, 2016, and 2020.

The agreement was entered into separately by Krause on the same day that Prince signed a five-year contract extension, on August 7, 2008. The agreement was allegedly discovered on May 11, 2009, as the university responded to "routine informational requests" for a lawsuit involving former coach Tim Tibesar. University president Jon Wefald denied any prior knowledge of this agreement and immediately called for Krause to resign, which he did, effective May 20, 2009.

In a subsequent release, interim Kansas State athletic director Jim Epps stated: "On May 11, 2009, I learned of a secret deferred compensation agreement that Bob Krause apparently negotiated with Ron Prince's attorney. This alleged deal was made without the knowledge of anyone else in the athletics department, including its attorney. This deal was apparently constructed as a further supplement to the buyout provision contained in Prince's employment contract. I do not know why any additional supplement was justified, or why Bob Krause concealed this agreement from everyone until it was inadvertently discovered last week."

On August 10, 2009, attorneys for Prince filed a counterclaim against Kansas State Athletics seeking $3 million in punitive damages. The filings claim that Wefald and other high-ranking members of the athletic department were aware at all times of the agreement. The claim also contended that Krause directed the department's attorney to reword the public contract to allow for a supplemental buyout.

Kansas State University announced on May 6, 2011, that an agreement for settlement between Prince and K-State Athletics, Inc. and the university had been reached. K-State Athletics, Inc. will pay one lump sum of $1.65 million to Prince's company, In Pursuit of Perfection, LLC, on or before May 25, 2011. This is in addition to the $1.2 million Prince had already received per his employment contract, for a total buyout payment of $2.85 million. K-State President Kirk Schulz stated: "We are pleased to have this matter resolved. We appreciate the work that our University counsel has provided during this process and can now maintain focus on moving forward as a University community." K-State Athletics, Inc. reported paying $395,000 in external legal fees during the dispute. The university made the agreement public as a news release and was bound to provide this statement: "Neither the University nor K-State Athletics contends or believes that in negotiating his employment agreement or the MOU, Coach Prince engaged in any wrongful or unethical conduct. Discovery has demonstrated that this situation was not of Coach Prince’s making."

=== Virginia (second stint), Rutgers, Michigan ===
In 2009, Prince was rehired by the University of Virginia as special teams coach, and spent one season with the program. After spending the 2010 through 2012 seasons coaching in the NFL, Prince was hired as offensive coordinator of the Rutgers Scarlet Knights on February 19, 2013, and spent one season in that role. Prince spent the 2018 season as an offensive analyst for the Michigan Wolverines.

=== Howard University ===
In December 2018, Prince was hired as the head coach for the Howard Bison. In early November 2019, Prince was placed on administrative leave by the university, "after allegations of verbal abuse and intimidation of players." The team was 1–8 at the time that Prince was placed on leave. On December 6, 2019, he resigned his position.

== Professional coaching ==
Indianapolis Colts

On March 21, 2010, the Indianapolis Colts announced the hiring of Prince as the assistant offensive line coach. On January 31, 2012, Prince was fired by new Colts head coach Chuck Pagano.

Jacksonville Jaguars

In February 2012, Prince was hired as assistant offensive line coach by the Jacksonville Jaguars and new head coach Mike Mularkey. Prince spent one season with the team.

Detroit Lions

After spending the 2013 season with Rutgers, Prince was hired as the assistant head coach and tight ends coach of the Detroit Lions on January 18, 2014. New Lions head coach Jim Caldwell had previously worked with Prince on the staff of the Indianapolis Colts. Prince was fired by the Detroit Lions on January 1, 2018.

== Personal life ==
Although Prince was born in Omaha, Nebraska, he was raised in Junction City, Kansas, a town 20 minutes west of Kansas State's campus in Manhattan, Kansas. He was raised by Ernest and Georgeanne Prince. He has three sons and a daughter.

Prince attended Junction City High School, where he graduated in 1988. He began his college football career at Dodge City Community College, then transferred to Appalachian State University, where he graduated and played on the offensive line under coach Jerry Moore.

== Head coaching record ==
Year	Team	Overall	Conference	Standing	Bowl/playoffs
Kansas State Wildcats (Big 12 Conference) (2006–2008)
2006	Kansas State	7–6	4–4	T–2nd (North)	L Texas
2007	Kansas State	5–7	3–5	4th (North)	
2008	Kansas State	5–7	2–6	T–4th (North)	
Kansas State:		17–20	9–15		
Howard Bison (Mid-Eastern Athletic Conference) (2019)
2019	Howard	1–8 (Note: Prince served as Howard's head coach for the first nine games of the 2019 season before he was placed on administrative leave. Aaron Kelton was appointed interim head coach for the final three games. Howard finished the year with an overall record of 2–10 and a mark of 2–6 in conference play, tying for seventh place in the Mid-Eastern Athletic Conference.)	1–4		
Howard:		1–8	1–4		
Total:		18–28			
