= 2006 Texas Bowl =

Rutgers Scarlet Knights	Kansas State Wildcats
(10–2)	(7–5)
Big East	Big 12
37	10
Head coach: Greg Schiano	Head coach: Ron Prince
AP / Coaches / BCS; 16 / 17 / 16
	1	2	3	4	Total
Rutgers	14	3	14	6	37
Kansas State	0	10	0	0	10
- Date: December 28, 2006
- Season: 2006
- Stadium: Reliant Stadium
- Location: Houston, Texas
- MVP: Ray Rice (HB, Rutgers)
- Referee: Jeff Flanagan (ACC)
- Attendance: 52,210

United States TV coverage
- Network: NFL Network
- Announcers: Spero Dedes, Mike Mayock, & Sterling Sharpe
- Nielsen ratings: 1.42

The 2006 Texas Bowl, part of the 2006 college football season, was played on December 26, 2006 at Reliant Stadium in Houston, Texas. The game featured the Rutgers Scarlet Knights and the Kansas State Wildcats.

Rutgers running back Ray Rice ran for 170 yards and a touchdown, Tim Brown caught two TD passes and the 16th-ranked Scarlet Knights won a bowl game for the first time in program history, beating Kansas State 37–10 in the Texas Bowl.

Linebacker Quintero Frierson returned an interception 27 yards for a touchdown on the first play from scrimmage of the second half and Rutgers (11–2) cruised from there, earning an 11th victory for the second time in 137 seasons. The Scarlet Knights' seventh-ranked defense manhandled Kansas State's offense, holding the Wildcats to 162 total yards and six first downs. Freshman quarterback Josh Freeman was 10-for-21 for 129 yards with two interceptions.

Kansas State (7–6) mustered only 85 yards after Frierson's return of Freeman's first interception put Rutgers up 24–10 just 33 seconds out of halftime. The Wildcats' only touchdown came on Yamon Figurs' 76-yard punt return with 9:37 left in the second quarter. Rice had a 24-yard run on Rutgers' next possession and Teel found Brown deep down the sideline for a 14–0 lead. Brown, a freshman from Miami, had only four catches and one touchdown reception coming into the game. Rutgers outscored its opponents 103–28 in the first quarter this season. On the first play of the second quarter, Freeman found Jordy Nelson on a crossing route for a 33-yard gain to set up Jeff Snodgrass' 44-yard field goal. Four minutes later, Figurs took Joe Radigan's punt up the middle, sidestepped Radigan and scored Kansas State's seventh special-teams touchdown of the season. Rice, the nation's fourth-leading rusher, had 74 yards rushing at halftime to move into third place on the school's career list. The Wildcats' offense had only one more yard at halftime (77) than Figurs gained on his punt return.

Freeman was on the run when Frierson leaped to pick off his wobbly pass. Freeman's 14th interception of the season was his fifth in the Wildcats' last three games. Rice burst through the line and ran untouched through the defense for 46 yards and his 20th touchdown of the season to make it 31–10 with 11:41 left in the third quarter, and that was more than enough for Rutgers. The Wildcats' offense did nothing after that, failing to get a first down for the rest of the third quarter. Freshman Leon Patton, Kansas State's leading rusher, fumbled at the Wildcats' 22 near the end of the quarter, setting up the second of Jeremy Ito's three field goals. Teel finished 16 for 28 for 268 yards without an interception. Brown had four catches for 101 yards and Clark Harris made seven catches for 120. Kansas State was playing in a bowl for the 12th time in 14 seasons, but for the first time since the Fiesta Bowl following the 2003 season. The Wildcats dropped to 6–6 in those dozen. It was Kansas State's only bowl game with Ron Prince as head coach.

== Statistics ==
Statistics	RUT	KSU
First downs	21	6
Plays–yards	65–479	45–162
Rushes–yards	37–211	21–31
Passing yards	268	131
Passing: Comp–Att–Int	16–28–0	12–24–2
Time of possession	36:20	23:40
