= Washington State University Global Campus =

Online university based in Pullman, Washington, U.S.

- Type: Public
- Established: 2012
- President: Kirk Schulz
- Director: David Cillay
- Students: 3,100
- Location: Pullman, Washington, U.S.
- Colors: Crimson and Gray
- Nickname: Cougars
- Mascot: Butch the Cougar
- Website: online.wsu.edu

Washington State University Global Campus (or WSU Global Campus) is the distance learning campus of Washington State University, a public university headquartered in Pullman, Washington, United States.

The Global Campus was established on July 2, 2012. It combines the university's online-based instructional programs and offerings, and adds programs designed to bring online education to a wider audience.
