= Jon Wefald =

American academic (1937–2022)

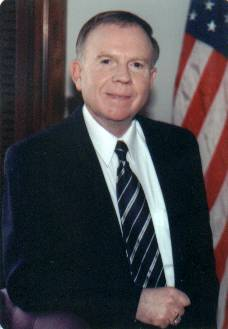
- Wefald in 1999

12th President of Kansas State University
- In office July 1986 – June 14, 2009
- Preceded by: Duane Acker
- Succeeded by: Kirk Schulz

Personal details
- Born: Jon Michael Wefald; November 24, 1937 Minneapolis, Minnesota, U.S.
- Died: April 16, 2022 (aged 84) St. Cloud, Minnesota
- Spouse: Ruth Ann Joynt
- Children: "Skipp" and Andy
- Education: Pacific Lutheran University (BA); Washington State University (MA); University of Michigan (PhD)
- Profession: Academic administrator
- Website: Jon Wefald: 12th K-State President

Jon Michael Wefald (November 24, 1937 – April 16, 2022) was an American educator and served as the twelfth president of Kansas State University.

== Biography ==
Wefald was born in Minneapolis and moved, at age six, with his family to Minot, North Dakota. After high school, he attended Pacific Lutheran University where he earned a B.A. in history in 1959. Wefald then earned his M.A. in history and political science from Washington State University in 1961, and Ph.D. in history from the University of Michigan in 1965.

== Career ==
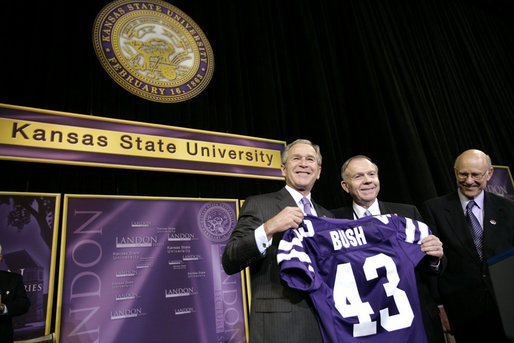
President George W. Bush receiving a Kansas State football jersey from Jon Wefald

=== Early career ===
In 1965, Wefald returned to Minnesota, taking his first faculty position at Gustavus Adolphus College, where he taught history for five years. From 1971 to 1977, he served as Minnesota's Commissioner of Agriculture, and guest lectured. In 1977, he became President of Southwest State University in Marshall, Minnesota. In 1982, he became a Chancellor of the six state university system of Minnesota.

=== Kansas State University ===
In July 1986, Wefald began his service as president of Kansas State University. Wefald held the second-longest term of any Kansas State president, trailing only the 25-year tenure of James McCain. During his tenure at K-State, over 2,000,000 square feet (190,000 m^{2}) of new buildings were built, private giving increased from $6 million a year to nearly $100 million a year, research funding increased from $18 million to $110 million a year, enrollment increased from 17,000 to 23,000, and, finally, K-State students won 125 Rhodes, Marshall, Truman, Goldwater, and Udall Scholarships from 1986 to 2008—more than any other public university in America.

=== Post-retirement ===
Wefald announced on May 12, 2008, that he would retire at the end of the 2008–2009 academic year. Subsequently, a routine audit performed by the Kansas Board of Regents determined that during Wefald's tenure a total of 13 undocumented payments had been made to former head football Coach Bill Snyder, former athletic director Tim Weiser and Bob Krause, a former vice president and athletic director at the university. Combined, these payments amounted to $845,000. Additionally, a plan was uncovered during the audit to "funnel more than $3 million in deferred compensation to former football coach Ron Prince." On May 20, 2009, Kansas State University and its athletic corporation filed suit to have a secret agreement between Prince and Krause declared invalid. Prince filed a lawsuit against the university which included the claim that Wefald and other high-ranking university officials had "actual or constructive knowledge" of the transaction. In May 2011, the lawsuit was settled and Prince received $1.65 million.

Wefald denied any knowledge of this secret transaction, attributed the discrepancies to Krause, and immediately called for Krause to resign as director of economic development for the K-State Olathe Innovation Campus, which he did effective on May 20, 2009.

In June 2014, the Kansas Board of Regents approved Kansas State University's request to name its new residence hall in Wefald's honor. Construction of Wefald Hall started in the fall of 2014 and was completed in the fall of 2016. In approving the university's request, Regents Chair Fred Logan said, "I think if you look at higher education in Kansas, he (Wefald) was, it's fair to say, a historic figure. He was a historic president."

== Honors ==
- In 2002, Jon Wefald was honored by inclusion in the Scandinavian-American Hall of Fame at the Norsk Høstfest.
- In 2002, Jon Wefald was honored as Distinguished Kansan by the Native Sons and Daughters of Kansas.
- In 2009, Jon Wefald was named Kansan of the Year by the Kansas Society of Washington, D.C.
- In 2009, officials at Fort Leavenworth honored Jon Wefald with the Department of the Army's Outstanding Civilian Service Medal.
- On April 17, 2015, Jon Wefald was initiated into the Alpha Tau Omega fraternity by an Initiation Team of the National Board of Directors and undergraduates from Delta Theta chapter at Kansas State University at the National Board Meeting in Kansas City, Missouri.

== Footnotes ==
Party political offices
Preceded by R. E. Hansen	Democratic nominee for Minnesota State Auditor; 1970	Succeeded by Robert W. Mattson Jr.
