= LaMark Brown =

American gridiron football player (born 1989)

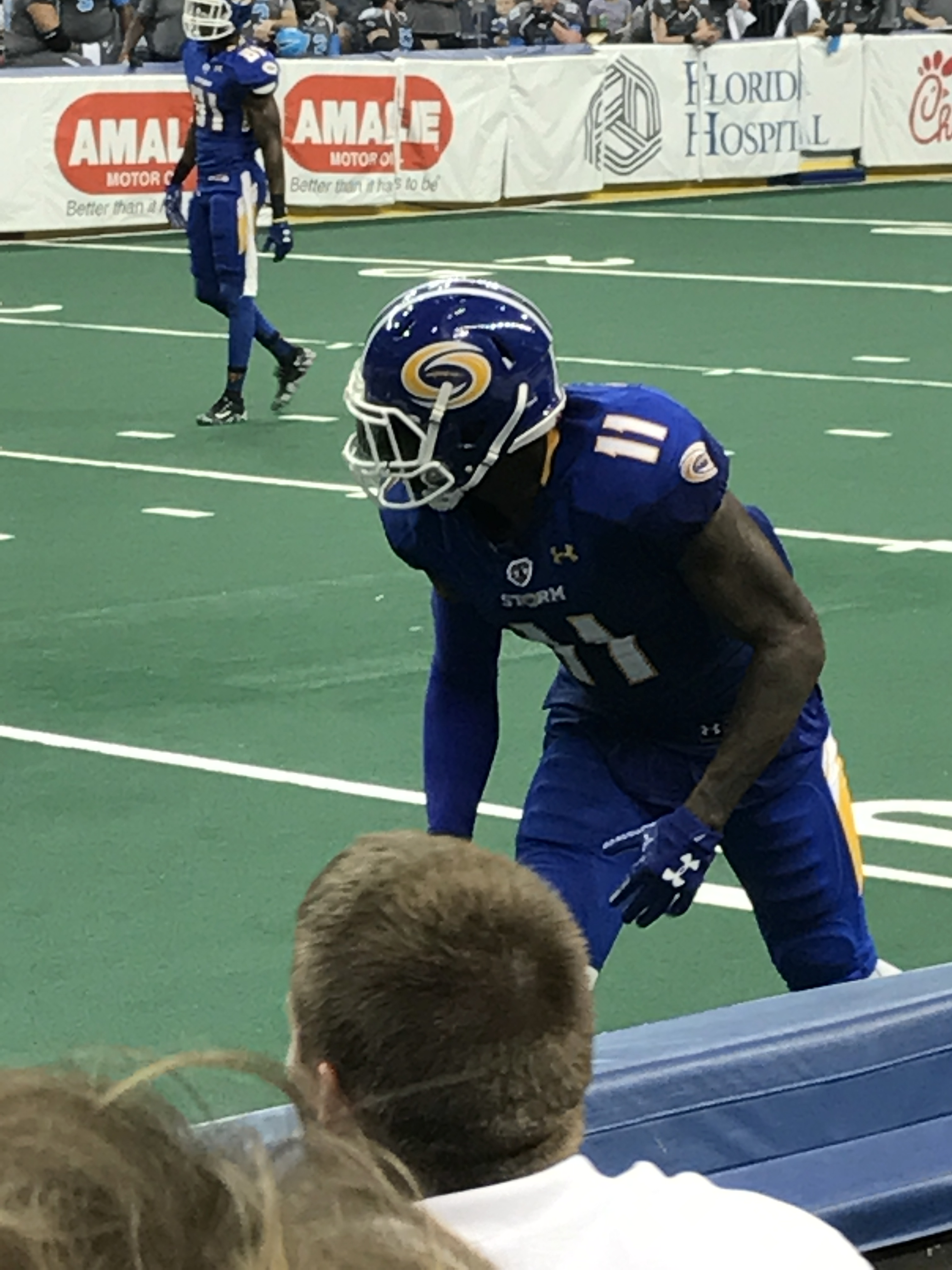
- Brown with the Tampa Bay Storm in 2017

No. 13, 11
- Position: Wide receiver

Personal information
- Born: July 5, 1989 (age 37); Anchorage, Alaska, U.S.
- Listed height: 6 ft 4 in (1.93 m)
- Listed weight: 225 lb (102 kg)

Career information
- High school: Hazelwood (MO) West
- College: Minnesota State
- NFL draft: 2012: undrafted

Career history
- Atlanta Falcons (2012)*; Buffalo Bills (2012)*; Tampa Bay Buccaneers (2012)*; Utah Blaze (2013)*; Minnesota Vikings (2012−2013)*; Hamilton Tiger-Cats (2013)*; Arizona Rattlers (2014)*; Orlando Predators (2014–2016); Hamilton Tiger-Cats (2014)*; Tampa Bay Storm (2017); Baltimore Brigade (2018); Atlantic City Blackjacks (2019)
- * Offseason or practice squad member only

Career AFL statistics
- Receptions: 147
- Receiving yards: 1,685
- Receiving touchdowns: 28
- Total tackles: 23.5
- Interceptions: 1
- Stats at ArenaFan.com
- Stats at Pro Football Reference

LaMark Brown II (born July 5, 1989) is an American former professional football wide receiver. He was signed as an undrafted free agent by the Atlanta Falcons in 2012. He played college football for the Minnesota State Mavericks.

== Early life ==
Brown started all four years at Hazelwood West High School in Hazelwood, Missouri at free safety and running back and was a two-time consensus Class 6 all-state performer by the Missouri Coaches Association, the Missouri Sportswriters and Sportscasters Association and the Kansas City Star. He was also named to the St. Louis Post-Dispatch All-Metro team in both 2005 and 2006.

As a junior, Brown had a breakout season as his team recorded a record of 7–3. In 10 games, Brown recorded 55 tackles (43 solo), three interceptions, and one fumble recovery. At running back, he rushed for 1,249 yards and 21 touchdowns on 150 carries. As a senior, Brown had a less productive year as the team posted a 2–8 record. He ran for 584 yards on 92 carries (6.35 avg.); Scored 13 of the West's 20 touchdowns; caught three passes for 51 yards (17.0 avg.) and accounted for 44 percent of Hazelwood's total yards (800 of 1,814). Returned five kickoffs for 165 yards (33.0 avg); totaled 42 total tackles on defense, with 36 unassisted stops, three blocked field goals, two blocked punts and a fumble recovery.

Coming out of High School, Brown was regarded as the No. 1 rated prospect in the St. Louis metro area by the St. Louis Post Dispatch, was a 4 star recruit rated as the No. 3 player in the state of Missouri, No.4 athlete in the nation, and 71st overall player in the 2007 class by rivals.com. A PrepStar All-American and the No.35 overall player in the Midlands Region by SuperPrep. Brown also played in the East Meets West All-American Bowl in Orlando, Florida, following his senior season.

== College career ==
=== Kansas State ===
In 2007, Brown saw action in eight games as a true freshman and made one start at wide receiver. He totaled three catches for 33 yards on the season

In 2008, Brown played the first three games at wide receiver. The week before the Louisiana-Lafayette game, he was switched to running back. In his first game at running back, he totaled 137 yards and a touchdown. After playing Texas Tech the next week, Brown missed the next three games with a staph infection in his left knee. On the season, he rushed 118 times for 412 yards and 5 touchdowns and caught 24 passes for 178 yards and a touchdown.

In 2009, Brown moved back to wide receiver after his season at running back. He caught 18 passes for 215 yards and 2 touchdowns.

=== Minnesota State ===
In the summer of 2010, Brown transferred to Division II Minnesota State–Mankato, where he was required to sit out the 2010 season as a red-shirt per NCAA transfer rules. In the 2011 season, he caught 31 passes for 405 yards and five touchdowns.

=== Statistics ===
Year	Rushing				Receiving			
Year	Attempts	Yards	Average	TD	Receptions	Yards	Average	TD
2007	0	0	0	0	3	33	11.0	0
2008	118	412	3.5	5	24	178	7.4	1
2009	0	0	0	0	18	215	11.9	2
2011	31	98	3.2	4	31	405	13.1	5
Total	149	510	3.4	9	76	831	10.9	8

== Professional career ==
Brown signed as a rookie undrafted free agent with the Atlanta Falcons, but was released on August 31. On September 3, 2012, Brown was signed to the Buffalo Bills practice squad but was released shortly after. On December 10, 2012, Brown was signed by the Minnesota Vikings as a practice squad wide receiver. Brown was released by the Vikings on August 26, 2013 (along with 12 others) to get to a 75-man roster.

Brown was assigned to the Tampa Bay Storm on January 17, 2017. The Storm folded in December 2017.

On March 20, 2018, Brown was assigned to the Baltimore Brigade.

On March 6, 2019, Brown was assigned to the expansion Atlantic City Blackjacks.
