= Bob Krause (athletic director) =

American athletics director (1945–2015)

Robert S. "Bob" Krause
- Born: September 12, 1945; Chicago, Illinois, U.S.
- Died: December 16, 2015 (aged 70); Manhattan, Kansas, U.S.
- Education: Western Illinois University, B.A. Michigan State University, M.A.
- Children: 3

Robert S. "Bob" Krause (September 12, 1945 – December 16, 2015) was the vice president for institutional advancement at Kansas State University, USA, from 1986 to 2009 as well as acting athletic director from 2008 to 2009. He announced his resignation on March 31, 2009.

== Education ==
Krause received a bachelor's degree in art education and art from Western Illinois University in 1967, and his master's degree in college student personnel work from Michigan State University in 1968.

== Minnesota ==
From 1975 to 1983, Krause was vice president for student affairs at Southwest State University in Minnesota. He then became director of student affairs in the Minnesota State Colleges and Universities System from 1983 to 1986, where he co-ordinated policy and program development for seven state universities enrolling more than 51,000 students. In 1986, he became the vice president for institutional advancement at Kansas State University. There, he is best known for taking a then-destitute athletic department and building a Big 12 championship-winning football program.

== Kansas State ==
Krause was hired in 1986. He was then hired, in tandem with his vice presidency as co-athletic director with Jim Epps on June 6, 2008, to replace Tim Weiser, who left to become the deputy director of the Big 12 Conference. Krause was the 14th athletic director at Kansas State. In his 11 months at the helm of the athletic department, his most controversial act as athletic director was offering a contract extension and larger buyout for football coach Ron Prince, who was fired four months later.

Krause resigned from his position on January 27, 2009, effective March 31, 2009, due to controversy involving a $2 million settlement award to the former athletic director Weiser, who left Kansas State in part because he refused a raise and increased buyout for Prince. His most notable act was the dedication he gave to the university as its vice president of institutional advancement for 23 years.

Krause became director of development for the K-State Olathe Innovation Campus. However, due to an alleged secret negotiation of a deferred compensation agreement with the former head coach Ron Prince, Kansas State University's president, Jon Wefald, requested, and received, Krause's resignation.

== Prince buyout ==
On May 20, 2009, Kansas State University and its athletic corporation filed suit to have a secret agreement between Prince and Krause declared invalid. Krause had earlier entered into an agreement to pay a total of $3.2 million in three deferred payments to a corporation set up for Prince, In Pursuit of Perfection, LLC. The payments were scheduled to be made in 2015, 2016 and 2020. Prince had signed a five-year contract extension in August 2008, and the secret agreement called for the additional payout if he was terminated before December 31, 2008. Wefald denied any knowledge of this secret transaction and immediately called for Krause to resign as director of economic development for the K-State Olathe Innovation Campus, which he did, effective on May 20, 2009. The secret deal was discovered on May 11, 2009, as the university responded to "routine informational requests" for a lawsuit involving a former defensive coordinator Tim Tibesar.

K-State's interim athletic director, Jim Epps, said, "On May 11, 2009, I learned of a secret deferred compensation agreement that Bob Krause apparently negotiated with Ron Prince's attorney. This alleged deal was made without the knowledge of anyone else in the athletics department, including its attorney. This deal was apparently constructed as a further supplement to the buyout provision contained in Prince's employment contract. I do not know why any additional supplement was justified, or why Bob Krause concealed this agreement from everyone until it was inadvertently discovered last week." He added, "I do not believe that this agreement is valid, and the athletics department will vigorously fight any attempt to enforce it."

On August 10, 2009, attorneys for Prince filed a counterclaim against Kansas State Athletics seeking $3 million in punitive damages. The filings claimed that Wefald and other high-ranking members of the athletic department were aware of the buyout. The claim also contended that Krause directed the department's attorney to reword the public contract to allow for the confidential buyout.

Kansas State University announced on May 6, 2011, that an agreement for settlement between Prince, K-State Athletics, Inc. and the university had been reached. K-State Athletics, Inc. would pay one lump sum of $1.65 million to Prince. K-State's president, Kirk Schulz, said, "We are pleased to have this matter resolved. We appreciate the work that our University counsel has provided during this process and can now maintain focus on moving forward as a University community." K-State Athletics, Inc. reported paying $395,000 in external legal fees during the dispute. The university made the agreement public as a news release and was bound to provide this statement: "Neither the University nor K-State Athletics contends or believes that in negotiating his employment agreement or the MOU, Coach Prince engaged in any wrongful or unethical conduct. Discovery has demonstrated that this situation was not of Coach Prince’s making."

== Personal life ==
Krause was married to Martha Ann ("Marty") Vanier, a member of the Vanier family of Salina, Kansas, one of the state's wealthiest families. Krause has three daughters from a previous marriage. He died of cancer on December 16, 2015.
