= Reggie Walker (linebacker, born 1986) =

American football player (born 1986)

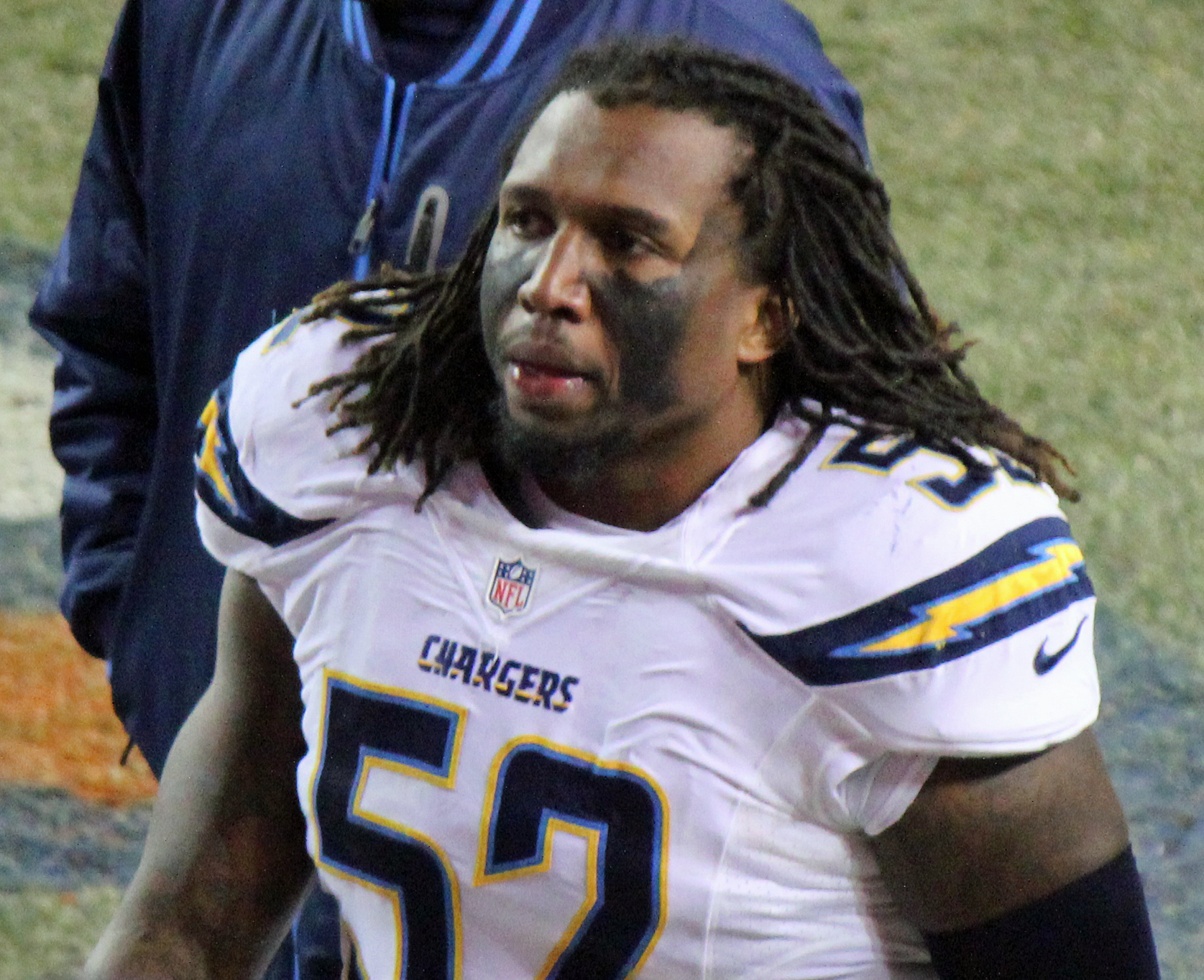
- Walker with the Chargers in 2013

No. 55, 56, 52
- Position: Linebacker

Personal information
- Born: December 15, 1986 (age 39); Fairbanks, Alaska, U.S.
- Listed height: 6 ft 0 in (1.83 m)
- Listed weight: 244 lb (111 kg)

Career information
- High school: Grant Union (Sacramento, California)
- College: Kansas State
- NFL draft: 2009: undrafted

Career history
- Arizona Cardinals (2009–2012); San Diego Chargers (2013–2014); Denver Broncos (2015)*
- * Offseason or practice squad member only

Career NFL statistics
- Total tackles: 95
- Sacks: 3.5
- Pass deflections: 2
- Forced fumbles: 1
- Stats at Pro Football Reference

Reginald Ernest Walker (born December 15, 1986) is an American former professional football player who was a linebacker in the National Football League (NFL). He played college football for the Kansas State Wildcats.

== Early life ==
Although he was born in Fairbanks, Alaska, Walker grew up in Missouri and Sacramento, California. During his three years as a starter at Grant Union High School in Sacramento, he was one of the top linebackers in the state of California. He was a Metro Conference selection and the league’s defensive MVP. He also was an all-conference selection in rugby and was involved in the math honors club.

== College career ==
Walker finished college career by starting 22 of 46 games played and registered 163 tackles, 15.5 tackles for loss, five sacks, six passes defensed, three forced fumbles and one fumble recovery.

== Professional career ==
=== Arizona Cardinals ===
He was signed by the Cardinals as an undrafted free agent in 2009. He was released from the Cardinals during the 2013-2014 pre-season.

=== San Diego Chargers ===
On September 1, 2013, he agreed to terms with the San Diego Chargers, reuniting with his former special teams coach Kevin Spencer and head coach Ken Whisenhunt. In his first year with the Chargers, Walker played all 16 games, starting 6 of them, while collecting 36 tackles, 3 sacks, 1 pass defended, and a forced fumble

=== Denver Broncos ===
Walker signed with the Denver Broncos on March 19, 2015. Walker was released by the Broncos following the 2015 preseason on August 31, 2015.
