= Kirk Schulz =

American academic

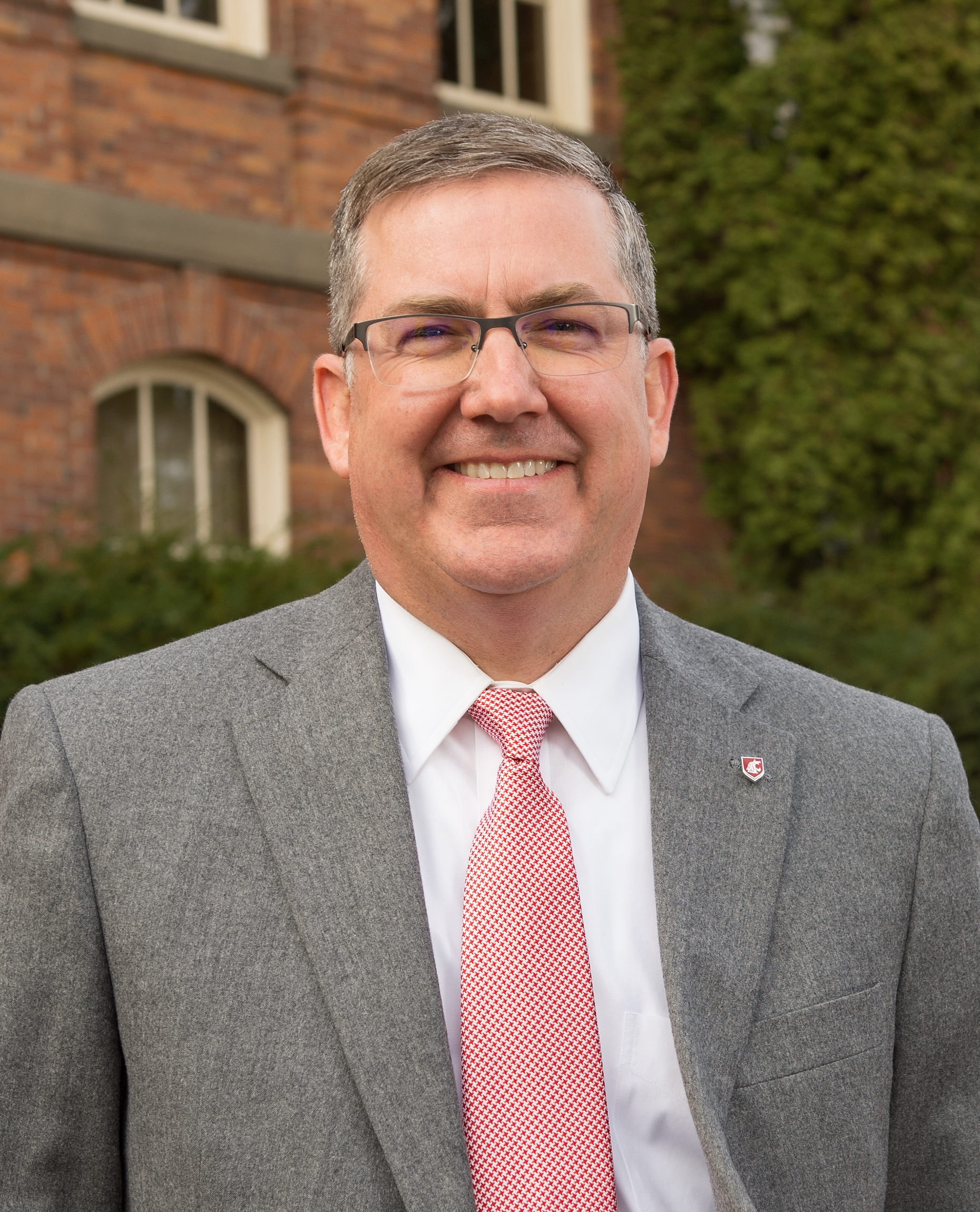
- Schulz in 2016

11th President of Washington State University
- In office June 13, 2016 – April 1, 2025
- Preceded by: Elson Floyd
- Succeeded by: Elizabeth R. Cantwell

13th President of Kansas State University
- In office June 15, 2009 – April 22, 2016
- Preceded by: Jon Wefald
- Succeeded by: Richard Myers

Personal details
- Born: Kirk Herman Schulz; May 11, 1963 (age 63) Portsmouth, Virginia, U.S.
- Spouse: Noel Schulz
- Children: 2
- Education: Old Dominion University; Virginia Tech (BS, MS, PhD)
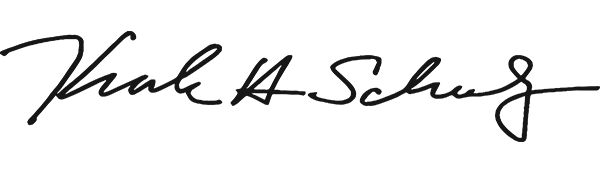
- Signature
- Scientific career
- Fields: Chemical engineering
- Institutions: University of North Dakota; Michigan Tech; Mississippi State University; Kansas State University; Washington State University
- Thesis: The partial oxidation of propene to acrolein over single-crystal cuprous oxide (1991)
- Doctoral advisor: David F. Cox

Kirk Herman Schulz (born May 11, 1963) is an American chemical engineer. He served as the 11th president of the Washington State University System from June 2016 to April 2025 and as the 13th president of Kansas State University from June 2009 to April 2016.

== Early life and education ==
Schulz was born in Portsmouth, Virginia, but raised in Norfolk, Virginia. He graduated in 1981 from Norfolk Christian High School. Schulz attended Old Dominion University for three years before transferring to Virginia Tech in 1984. He received his Bachelor of Science in chemical engineering from Virginia Tech in 1986 and a PhD in 1991.

== Career ==
Schulz first worked as an assistant professor of chemical engineering at the University of North Dakota. In 1995, he became assistant professor of chemical engineering at Michigan Technological University and promoted to associate professor in 1998. Schulz also became chair of the Department of Chemical Engineering there in the same year.

He accepted a position at Mississippi State University in 2001, becoming director of the Dave C. Swalm School of Chemical Engineering, where he held the Earnest W. Deavenport Jr. endowed chair. Schulz became Dean of Engineering of the James Worth Bagley College of Engineering and the first Earnest W. and Mary Ann Deavenport Jr. endowed chair in 2005. Two years later, Schulz was Interim Vice President for Research and Economic Development, a position which became permanent for him later in the year.

On February 11, 2009, the Kansas Board of Regents announced that Schulz was selected as the thirteenth president of Kansas State University. On March 25, 2016, the Washington State University Board of Regents announced that Schulz was selected as the 11th president of Washington State University, which he began in June 2016. In 2021, his roles related to the Pullman campus were delegated to a new chancellor, Elizabeth S. Chilton, and his role transitioned into setting the strategic vision and direction for the entire WSU system. Schulz announced his plan to retire at the end of the 2024-25 school year, amidst a declining academic reputation and rising debt of the university.

== Personal life ==
Schulz is married to Noel Schulz, who was the associate dean for research and graduate programs in the Kansas State University College of Engineering and the Paslay professor of electrical and computer engineering. They have two sons, Tim and Andrew.
