= Deon Murphy =

American gridiron football player (born 1986)

No. 17 – Hamilton Tiger-Cats
- Position: Wide receiver
- Roster status: Active
- CFL status: American

Personal information
- Born: April 15, 1986 (age 40); Houston, Texas, U.S.
- Listed height: 5 ft 10 in (1.78 m)
- Listed weight: 170 lb (77 kg)

Career information
- High school: Klein Forest
- College: Kansas State

Career history
- 2009–2011: Calgary Stampeders
- 2012–present: Hamilton Tiger-Cats

Awards and highlights
- Big 12 Offensive Newcomer of the Year (2007)

Deon Murphy (born April 15, 1986) is a Canadian football wide receiver for the Hamilton Tiger-Cats of the Canadian Football League (CFL).

== High school ==
Murphy started three seasons at Klein Forest High School, located in Houston, Texas. He earned second team All-District 15-5A honors in 2004 and was regarded among the top 50 receivers in the state of Texas. His senior year he helped Klein Forest finish to a 12-2 record and 9-1 for a bi-district title. Murphy hauled in 43 receptions for 583 yards and eight touchdowns as a senior. He totaled 522 yards on 36 catches with six touchdowns and helped Klein Forest to a 12-1 record and 10-0 record for a district title as a junior in 2003.

== College ==
Coffeyville Community College In 2006 Murphy was ranked first in the (KJCCC) Kansas Jayhawk Community College Conference and the nations second Punt Returner. Nationally ranked #67 top players and #14 in Kansas. He led the Red Ravens in all categories in receiving with 30 catches for 457 yards and 5 touchdowns. Finished his community college career against Snow Community College in the Zions Bank Top of the Mountain Bowl game. Murphy had 7 catches for 132 yards and 2 touchdowns. Murphy was timed at a 4.32 in the 40 yard dash and was offered by 5 schools. Kansas State, Iowa State, North Texas, Temple, and Wyoming. Also was a part of the track team.

=== Kansas State ===
In 2007, Murphy was named the Big 12 Conference Offensive Newcomer of the Year and earned honorable mention accolades as a receiver and punt returner from the league’s coaches. He also earned first team honors as a punt returner from Rivals.com and the Ranked first in the Big 12 and second nationally with a punt return average of 17.5 yards. He finished the year with 57 catches for 655 yards and 8 touchdowns. He will not play for the Wildcats in 2009. Had thoughts to return to Kansas State or to transfer to another school for the 2009 season. Made the decision to enter the 2009 NFL Supplemental Draft.

=== Overall Stats ===
| Year | GP | Rec. | Yards | Avg | Long | Rec. TD |
|---|---|---|---|---|---|---|
| 2007 | 12 | 71 | 705 | 10.6 | 66 | 10 |
| 2008 | 12 | 57 | 655 | 15.0 | 70 | 8 |
| Total | 24 | 128 | 1,360 | 12.3 | 70 | 18 |

== Professional career ==
=== Calgary Stampeders ===
On October 7, 2009, Murphy was signed by the Calgary Stampeders of the Canadian Football League.

In 2010, he played in 16 games with the Stampeders and caught 25 passes for 271 yards and four touchdowns. He led the Stampeders with 911 kickoff return yards, 533 punt return yards and 145 missed field goal return yards.

After attending training camp in 2011, he was released by the Stampeders on June 25, 2011.

=== Hamilton Tiger-Cats ===
On May 23, 2012, Murphy was signed by the Hamilton Tiger-Cats.
